= List of Argentine classical composers =

This is an alphabetical list of Argentine classical composers.

- Abel Fleury (1903-1958)
- Antonio Agri (1932–1998)
- Amancio Jacinto Alcorta (1805–1862)
- Eduardo Alonso-Crespo (born 1956)
- Rodolfo Arízaga (1926–1985)
- Hector Ayala (1914–1990)
- Luis Bacalov (born 1933)
- Esteban Benzecry (born 1970)
- Felipe Boero (1884–1958)
- José Antonio Bottiroli (1920–1990)
- José Bragato (1915–2017)
- Carlos López Buchardo (1881–1948)
- Facundo Cabral (1937-2011)
- Sergio Calligaris (born 1941)
- Julio de Caro (1899–1980)
- Fernando González Casellas (1925–1998)
- Graciela Castillo (born 1940)
- Juan José Castro (1895–1968)
- Alejandro Civilotti (born 1959)
- Ellen C. Covito (born 1974)
- Mario Davidovsky (1934–2019)
- Hilda Dianda (1925–2014)
- Daniel Doura (born 1957)
- Oscar Edelstein (born 1953)
- Juan Pedro Esnaola (1808–1878)
- Juan Falú (born 1948)
- Juan de Dios Filiberto (1885–1964)
- Roberto Firpo (1884–1969)
- Carlos Gardel (1890–1935)
- Alberto Ginastera (1916–1983)
- Osvaldo Golijov (born 1960)
- Carlos Guastavino (1912–2000)
- Emilio Kauderer (born 1950)
- Mauricio Kagel (1931–2008)
- Marcelo Koc (1918–2006)
- Maria Teresa Luengo (born 1940)
- Enrique Maciel (1897–1962)
- Claudio Maldonado (born 1980)
- Rosita Melo (1897–1981)
- Rosendo Mendizabal (1868–1913)
- Silvina Milstein (born 1956)
- Ricardo Montaner (born 1957)
- Jorge Morel (born 1931)
- Mariano Mores (1918-2016)
- Nelly Moretto (1925–1978)
- Ettore Panizza (1875–1967)
- Graciela Paraskevaidis (1940–2017)
- Marcela Pavia (born 1957)
- Juan Carlos Paz (1901–1972)
- Polo Piatti (1954-)
- Astor Piazzolla (1921–1992)
- Osvaldo Pugliese (1905–1995)
- Máximo Diego Pujol (born 1957)
- Ariel Ramírez (1921–2010)
- Waldo de los Ríos (1934–1977)
- Zenón Rolón (1856–1902)
- Enrique Saborido (1877–1941)
- Juan María Solare (born 1966)
- Atilio Stampone (1926-2022)
- Alicia Terzian (born 1934)
- Juan Carlos Tolosa (born 1966)
- Terig Tucci (1897–1973)
- Irma Urteaga (born 1929)
- Alberto Williams (1862–1952)
- Francisco Kröpfl (1931–2021)
- Gerardo Gandini (1936–2013)
- Alcides Lanza (born 1929)
