= Chronological list of Argentine classical composers =

This is a chronological list of Argentine classical composers.

== Romantic ==
- Amancio Jacinto Alcorta (1805–1862)
- Juan Pedro Esnaola (1808–1878)
- Zenón Rolón (1856–1902)

== Modern/Contemporary ==
- Alberto Williams (1862–1952)
- Rosendo Mendizabal (1868–1913)
- Ettore Panizza (1875–1967)
- Enrique Saborido (1877–1941)
- José Antonio Bottiroli (1920–1990)
- Carlos López Buchardo (1881–1948)
- Felipe Boero (1884–1958)
- Roberto Firpo (1884–1969)
- Juan de Dios Filiberto (1885–1964)
- Carlos Gardel (1890–1935)
- Juan José Castro (1895–1968)
- Enrique Maciel (1897–1962)
- Terig Tucci (1897–1973)
- Rosita Melo (1897–1981)
- Julio de Caro (1899–1980)
- Juan Carlos Paz (1901–1972)
- Osvaldo Pugliese (1905–1995)
- Carlos Guastavino (1912–2000)
- Hector Ayala (1914–1990)
- José Bragato (1915–2017)
- Alberto Ginastera (1916–1983)
- Marcelo Koc (1918–2006)
- Ástor Piazzolla (1921–1992)
- Ariel Ramírez (1921–2010)
- Mariano Mores (1922–2016)
- Hilda Dianda (1925–2014)
- Nelly Moretto (1925–1978)
- Fernando González Casellas (1925–1998)
- Rodolfo Arízaga (1926–1985)
- Atilio Stampone (Born 1926)
- Irma Urteaga (1929–2022)
- Mauricio Kagel (1931–2008)
- Jorge Morel (1931–2021)
- Antonio Agri (1932–1998)
- Waldo de los Ríos (1934–1977)
- Mario Davidovsky (1934–2019)
- Alicia Terzian (Born 1934)
- Maria Teresa Luengo (Born 1940)
- Graciela Castillo (Born 1940)
- Graciela Paraskevaidis (Born 1940)
- Sergio Calligaris (Born 1941)
- Oscar Edelstein (Born 1953)
- Silvina Milstein (Born 1956)
- Eduardo Alonso-Crespo (Born 1956)
- Daniel Doura (born 1957)
- Marcela Pavia (Born 1957)
- Miguel del Aguila (Born 1957)
- Máximo Diego Pujol (Born 1957)
- Alejandro Civilotti (Born 1959)
- Osvaldo Golijov (Born 1960)
- Juan Carlos Tolosa (Born 1966)
- Esteban Benzecry (Born 1970)
