= Coriún Aharonián =

Uruguayan composer and musicologist

Coriún Aharonián (4 August 1940 – 8 October 2017; born in Montevideo) was an Uruguayan composer and musicologist of Armenian ethnicity.

He was a pupil of Luigi Nono, Héctor Tosar, Lauro Ayestarán, Gerardo Gandini, Vinko Globokar, György Ligeti, Gordon Mumma, Folke Rabe, Fernando von Reichenbach, Christian Wolff, and Iannis Xenakis.

In 2004 he was awarded a Guggenheim Fellowship.

He was married to musicologist Graciela Paraskevaídis.

== Students ==
Among the students of Coriún Aharonián were musicians such as Jorge Drexler, Jaime Roos, Rubén Olivera, Leo Masliah, Jorge Lazaroff, Luis Trochón, Mauricio Ubal, Gonzalo Varela, and Carlos da Silveira.

== Books ==
- Introducción a la música (Tacuabé, Montevideo, 2002. Reeditado en 2008 y 2012)
- Músicas populares del Uruguay (Universidad de la República, Montevideo, 2007. Reeditado por Tacuabé, Montevideo, 2010 y 2014)
- Educación, arte, música (Tacuabé, Montevideo, 2004. Reeditado en 2013)
- Conversaciones sobre música, cultura e identidad (Ombú, Montevideo, 1992. Reeditado por Tacuabé en 2000, 2005 y 2012)
- Hacer música en América Latina (Tacuabé, Montevideo, 2012. Reeditado en 2014)
- Héctor Tosar, compositor uruguayo (Trilce, Montevideo, 1991)
