= Carlos Guastavino =

Argentine composer

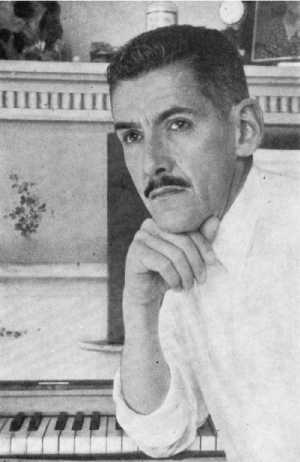
- Born: 5 April 1912; Argentina
- Died: 29 October 2000 (aged 88)

Carlos Guastavino (5 April 1912 – 29 October 2000) was an Argentine composer, considered one of the foremost composers of his country. His production amounted to over 500 works, most of them songs for piano and voice, many still unpublished. His style was quite conservative, always tonal and lushly romantic. His compositions were clearly influenced by Argentine folk music. His reputation was based almost entirely on his songs, and Guastavino has sometimes been called "the Schubert of the Pampas". Some of his songs, for example Pueblito, mi pueblo, La rosa y el sauce ("The Rose and the Willow") and Se equivocó la paloma ("The Dove Was Mistaken"), became national favorites. Unlike most other composers, at any time or place, Guastavino earned enough from his royalties and performing rights that he had little need for other income.

Many famous performers, such as Teresa Berganza, Martha Argerich, Gidon Kremer, José Carreras, Kiri Te Kanawa, Patricia Caicedo, Bernarda Fink, Cecilia Pillado, María Isabel Siewers, Jorge Chaminé, Agathe Martel, Karina Gauvin, Julie Nesrallah, José Cura and Anna Netrebko have included works of Guastavino on their programs or recordings.

== Life ==
Carlos Guastavino was born in Santa Fe Province, Argentina. He studied music in Santa Fe with Esperanza Lothringer and Dominga Iaffei, and in Buenos Aires with Athos Palma. A talented pianist, he performed his piano works in London in 1947, 1948, and 1949, invited by the BBC, and as a recipient of a scholarship from the British Council. During these years, the BBC Symphony Orchestra premiered the orchestral version of his Tres Romances Argentinos, under the baton of Walter Goehr. Later, in 1956, Guastavino toured the USSR and China, performing his pieces for voice and piano.

== Compositional style ==
Guastavino's musical style marked a stark contrast with the works of his 20th-century Argentine contemporaries such as Alberto Ginastera and reveals the influence of European composers such as Albéniz, Granados, Rachmaninoff, Chabrier, Falla, Debussy, and Ravel, but also is clearly inherited from the luminaries of 19th-century Argentine nationalist composers, such as Alberto Williams, Ernesto Drangosch, Francisco Hargreaves, Eduardo García Mansilla and Julián Aguirre. Aguirre's delicate and intimate piano writing is an especially evident influence on Guastavino. Guastavino's stylistic isolation from the modernist and avant-garde movements going on around him, and the self-consciously nationalist content of his songs made him a model for Argentine popular and folk musicians in the 1960s.

Guastavino published more than 150 songs for voice and piano, numerous piano solo pieces, choral works, school songs, and chamber music. The poets whose works he set to music included Rafael Alberti, Leon Benarós, Hamlet Lima Quintana, Atahualpa Yupanqui, Pablo Neruda, Gabriela Mistral, and Jorge Luis Borges. A small number of his songs are settings of his own texts. His works for orchestra included Divertissement; fue una vez, commissioned by Colonel W. de Basil for his original Ballet Russe and premiered at the Teatro Colón, in Buenos Aires, in 1942; and Suite Argentina which was performed in London, Paris, Barcelona, and Havana by the Ballet Español of Isabel Lopez. He also wrote three Sonatas for guitar.

== Awards ==
Guastavino received important awards and recognition, such as the Municipal Prize from the city of Buenos Aires for his chamber songs, a prize from the Justice Ministry of Argentina, Prize of the Cultural Commission of Santa Fe Province for his songs, "Vosotras" magazine Prize for his "Canción de Navidad", and a Prize from the Organization of American States and the Inter-American Music Council as recognition of his outstanding creative activity.

== Selected discography ==
- Carlos Guastavino: Melodías Argentinas. Marcela Roggeri, piano Florent Héau, clarinet. Transart Live Records. France
- Carlos Guastavino: The Complete Piano Music, Martin Jones, piano. Nimbus, NI 5818/20 (2008).
- Carlos Gustavino: Tres Romances argentinos op.2; Martha Argerich & Mauricio Vallina, 2 pianos. EMI "Martha Argerich EDITION: Solo & Duos 50999 0 94044 2 7 (6 CD 2011)<(live recording 14.VI.2005 Auditorio Stello Molo, Lugano)>
- Flores Argentinas, Desiree Halac, mezzo-soprano; Dalton Baldwin, piano. Albany Records (2008).
- Art Songs of Latin-America. Patricia Caicedo, soprano & Pau Casan, piano. Albert Moraleda Records, Barcelona (2001).
- A mi ciudad nativa (To my native city), Art Songs of Latin-America, Vol. II, Patricia Caicedo, soprano; Eugenia Gassull, piano. Mundo Arts Records, Barcelona (2006).
- Flores Argentinas: Canciones de Ginastera y Guastavino, Inca Rose Duo: Annelise Skovmand, voice; Pablo González Jazey, guitar. Cleo Productions, Cleo Prod, 1002 (2007).
- Canciones Argentinas, Bernarda Fink, mezzo-soprano; Marcos Fink, bass-baritone; Carmen Piazzini, piano. Harmonia Mundi, HMC 901892 (2006).
- Cuántas Estrellas!: Argentine Piano Music vol. 2 , Cecilia Pillado, piano. Berlin Classics, 0011852BC (TaMa 261219302) (1999).
- Tango Malambo: Argentine Piano Music vol. 1 , Cecilia Pillado, piano. Berlin Classics, 0011802BC (TaMa 261219301) (1998).
- Vai Azulão, Agathe Martel, soprano; Marc Bourdeau, piano. Marquis Classic, MAR 285 (2002).
- Canciones Amatorias, Bernarda Fink, mezzo-soprano; Roger Vignoles, piano. Hyperion, CDA 67186 (2002).
- Flores Argentinas, Marcos Fink, bass-baritone; Luis Ascot, piano. Cascavelle, VEL1059 (1996).
- Mélodies, Jorge Chaminé, baritone; Marie-Françoise Bucquet, piano. Lyrinx, 149 (882 149) (1995).
- Argentinian Songs, Raúl Giménez, tenor; Nina Walker, piano. Nimbus Records, NI 5107 (1987).
- Classics of the Americas, vol. 2, Margot Pares-Reyna, soprano; Georges Rabol, piano. Opus 111, OPS 30-9002 (1990).
- South American Songs, Teresa Berganza, mezzo-soprano; Juan-Antonio Alvarez-Parejo, piano. Claves, CD 50-8401 (1984).
- Canciones populares argentinas Juan Carlos Taborda, tenor; Carlos Guastavino, piano – ANTAR, 1964
- Guitar Music of Argentina, vol. 1, Victor Villandagos, guitar. Naxos Classical, 8-555058 (2002).
- Guitar Music of Argentina, vol. 2, Victor Villandagos, guitar. Naxos Classical, 8-557658 (2002).
- Carlos Guastavino: Piano Music, Hector Moreno, piano; Norberto Capelli, piano. Marco Polo, 8-223462 (1992).
- Carlos Guastavino: Las Puertas de la Mañana, Ulises Espaillat, tenor; Pablo Zinger, piano. New Albion, NA058 (1993).
- Carlos Guastavino: Guitar and Chamber Music, María Isabel Siewers, guitar; Stamitz Quartet. London, ASV 933 (1991).
- Fantasia Sul America: Clarinet Masterworks from South America, Luis Rossi, clarinet; Diana Schneider. Giorgina Records. NR 1104 (199?).
- Carlos Guastavino: Obras para guitarra y música de cámara María Isabel Siewers, guitar; Stamic Quartet, Acqua Records 275
