= Putzi =

Putzi may refer to:

- a nickname of Ernst Hanfstaengl, a German-American businessman and close ally of Adolf Hitler
- Putzi, an opera in one act with music and libretto by Argentine composer Eduardo Alonso-Crespo
- Putzi fly, a type of fly responsible for myiasis
- Putzi (toothpaste), a German brand of children's toothpaste
