= Daniel Doura =

Argentine classical composer

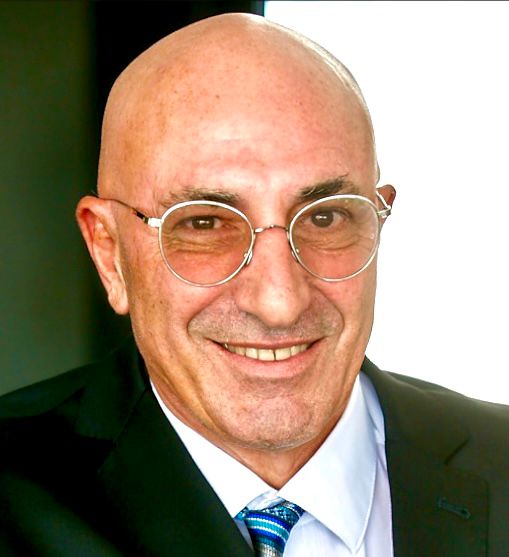
- Doura in 2022.
- Born: 9 August 1957 (age 69); Buenos Aires, Argentina
- Education: Boston Conservatory; Massachusetts Institute of Technology; Columbia University
- Occupations: Composer; musician
- Notable work: Quintet 1984: Piano and String Quartet (1984); Visiones patagónicas (1998); Sinfonía argentina (with Alejandro Roemmers) (2009); Sueños de verano (2017)
- Musical career
- Genres: Classical music; choral music; electronic music; electroacoustic music
- Years active: 1973–present
- Website: douradaniel.com

Daniel Doura (pronounced [daˈnjel ˈdowɾa]; born 9 August 1957) is an Argentine composer of classical music. Considered one of the Argentine composers who currently have international exposure, Doura is a graduate of the Boston Conservatory, the Massachusetts Institute of Technology and the Columbia University, and among his teachers were John Cage, Mario Davidovsky, Chou Wen-chung, Alberto Ginastera, Luciano Berio, Tōru Takemitsu, Milton Babbitt and John Adams, among others. He received the Best Composition award from the American Society of Composers, Authors and Publishers (ASCAP) in 1985 and was a finalist for the Best Composition award from the American Academy of Arts and Sciences (AAA&S).

In 2007, he premiered the symphonic poem Visiones patagónicas, awarded by the Argentine Music Critics Association (Spanish: Asociación de Críticos Musicales de la Argentina) as the best Argentine premiere of the year. The following year, he composed Sinfonía argentina together with the writer Alejandro Roemmers, a symphonic-choral work conceived on the occasion of the Argentine Bicentennial celebrations, which began with that of the May Revolution in 2010 and ended with that of the Independence in 2016. Sinfonía argentina had its Argentine premiere in 2011 at the Teatro Colón and its world premiere in 2018 in a series of performances in the Czech Republic and Germany. To present the work, Doura and Roemmers held discussion events in 14 provinces of Argentina, and in 2017 they received the "Bicentennial Edition" Gold Disc award at the Embassy of the Oriental Republic of Uruguay.

In addition, Doura has composed music for ballets, art exhibitions and films, receiving the Best Score award at the 1985 New York University (NYU) Film Festival for his work on Commercial for Murder by director Amy Goldstein. In 2019, he again received the distinction of Best Argentine Premiere from the Argentine Music Critics Association for his composition Sueños de verano. Doura is a member of ASCAP and the National Academy of Recording Arts and Sciences (NARAS), the organization that holds the Grammy Awards. He is also a co-founder of PAMAR of New York, a non-profit organization for cultural exchange in the Americas; and, between 2020 and 2024, he worked as director of the audiovisual production company Franciscus Productions, based in Madrid.

== Life and career ==
=== 1957–2007: Education and early recognitions ===
Daniel Doura was born on 9 August 1957 in Buenos Aires, Argentina, into a family of music-loving industrialists. His father is one of the founders of the seaside resort town of Costa del Este, Buenos Aires Province. He began his musical studies in 1966, at the age of 9, taking guitar lessons with Clelia Sagreras. Doura later adopted the piano, an instrument he studied with Antonio de Raco in Argentina, Alberto Portugheis in the United Kingdom, and Jacqueline Gourdin and Alfred Churchill in the United States.

Between 1977 and 1987, Doura received musical training at leading American universities and conservatories, and was a student of renowned composers such as Hugo Norden, John Cage, Mario Davidovsky, Chou Wen-chung, Alberto Ginastera, Luciano Berio, Tōru Takemitsu, Theodore Antoniou, Milton Babbitt, John Adams, Seiji Ozawa and Fred Lerdahl, among others. He began his studies in Harmony and History at the Guildhall School of Music and Drama in London, but graduated with a Bachelor of Arts degree in Composition from the Boston Conservatory in (now associated with the Berklee College of Music) in 1982. Doura complemented this career with courses in electroacoustics directed by Barry Vercoe at the Massachusetts Institute of Technology in 1979, in addition to studying electronic music with Arthur Kreiger and other professors in New York between 1983 and 1986.

Between 1979 and 1982, Doura was a member of the Tanglewood Festival Chorus of the Boston Symphony Orchestra, while attending conducting courses with Rouben Gregorian and Colin Davis. Also, between 1983 and 1987, he completed a postgraduate degree in Arts and Sciences at the Columbia University, New York. In 1985, he was awarded the first prize for composition by the American Society of Composers, Authors and Publishers (ASCAP) in New York and, a year later, he was a finalist in the composition competition of the American Academy of Arts and Sciences in Cambridge, Massachusetts.

In addition, between 1979 and 1986, Doura composed music for films by directors Amy Goldstein, Rosemary Ricchio, Juan José Campanella (in the 1985 short film El contorsionista) and Gabriel García. For his work on the film Commercial for Murder directed by Goldstein, Doura received an award at the 1985 Film Festival of the Columbia University.

Doura has also composed ballet music for the National Ballet of Venezuela (1984) and for choreographers Héctor Zaraspe and Vicente Nebrada. His composition La pasión de Saverio (English: "The Passion of Saverio"), made in 2003 in memory of Roberto Arlt, was critically acclaimed after its premiere in Boston.

=== 2008–present: Most recent compositions ===
Miniatura andaluza n° 3
Sample of Miniatura andaluza n° 3 (English: "Andalusian Miniature No. 3"), off Doura's 2020 composition Suite Andalusí n° 2. Lorca x Luz (Escenas del Romancero).

In 2007, the composer premiered the symphonic poem Visiones patagónicas (English: "Patagonic Visions") at the Teatro Argentino de La Plata in La Plata, Buenos Aires Province. This composition was awarded with the distinction of Best Argentine Premiere of the year, awarded by the Argentine Music Critics Association (Spanish: Asociación de Críticos Musicales de la Argentina).

In 2008, Doura composed Sinfonía argentina (English: "Argentine Symphony") together with writer and poet Alejandro Roemmers. The symphonic work was conceived on the occasion of the Argentine Bicentennial celebrations, which began with that of the May Revolution in 2010 and ended with that of the Independence in 2016, is thematically centered on national identity of the country. In an interview, Doura stated that "the idea is that it should serve as a meditation for all Argentines to find our identity again or perhaps even discovering it." Sinfonía argentina has been identified as one of the first choral symphonies composed in the 21st century. The symphonic-choral work is conceived in a classical manner, with a duration of 48 minutes and organized in four movements that correspond to poems composed by Roemmers: first movement "De la arena", second movement "Del mar", third movement "Del ser", and fourth movement "De los pueblos".

A first version of Sinfonía argentina premiered in 2011 at the Teatro Colón in Buenos Aires, with guest conductor Carlos Bertazza, pianist Horacio Lavandera, guitarist César Angeleri and the Orfeón choir. Given the impossibility of recording the work in the country, Sinfonía argentina was recorded in Prague, Czech Republic in November 2015, performed by the Prague Metropolitan Orchestra and the Prague Chamber Choir and conducted by the Uruguayan Roberto Montenegro. The resulting CD was released in 2016 by the Uruguayan label Sondor. On April 28, 2017, the Embassy of the Oriental Republic of Uruguay in Argentina made a recognition to Doura, Roemmers and Montenegro, awarding the "Bicentennial Edition" Gold Disc distinction to the album. The event was declared of Cultural Interest by the Argentine Senate, in a statement that described Sinfonía argentina as "a first-rate artistic work".

In a 2016 article analyzing the history of classical music in Argentina from its origins to the present day, Lucio Bruno-Videla—current president of the Argentine Association of Composers—included Doura as one of the national composers who currently have international exposure, and related his work to that of the country's composers who preceded him:

Some of the numerous Argentine composers who today are internationally active are Esteban Benzecry (1970), Juan Manuel Abras (1975), Osvaldo Golijov (1960) and Daniel Doura (1957). In all of them one can perceive singularities linked to most of the previous ones, and even with conceptual characteristics (not necessarily stylistic) of the music of the American colonial Baroque, that is, the marked tendency to superimpose and juxtapose styles, techniques, etc. in ways different from those found in the works of hegemonic Europe. This continuity functions as a document of a true musical tradition of its own, a tradition understood as the continuity of a culture. These "ways of doing" characterize not only music, but the whole Latin American culture and are deeply rooted in the way of being, the language, the identities and a philosophical-cultural conception.

In 2013, Doura composed electronic music for the anthological exhibition of María Martorell entitled "María Martorell, la energía del color", held at the Museo de Bellas Artes de Salta, and later at the Centro Cultural Recoleta in Buenos Aires. In addition, he composed the music for the exhibition "Federico.... Dónde estés", which brought together works inspired by Federico García Lorca and was held in October 2021 at the ArtexArte gallery, Buenos Aires. The composition accompanied readings of Lorca's poems by gallery owner Luz Castillo, in counterpoint with a projection of images.

On 4 March 2018, Doura premiered the work Sueños de verano (English: "Summer Dreams") at Jordan Hall of the New England Conservatory of Music, Boston, performed by the Boston Civic Symphony under the baton of Francisco Noya. On August 10 of the same year, the composition had its Argentine premiere at the Symphonic Hall of the Kirchner Cultural Center, Buenos Aires, performed by the Argentine National Symphony Orchestra and conducted by Gustavo Fontana. Sueños de verano received the award for Best Argentine Premiere of the year, awarded by the Argentine Music Critics Association.

Sinfonía Argentina had its world premiere in Europe, performed by the Czech National Symphony Orchestra and the Czech Philharmonic Choir of Brno in a series of performances conducted by Montenegro. The first of these presentations was on 18 October 2018 in the city of Teplice, Czech Republic, followed by Munich, Germany on October 21 and ending in Prague on November 3. Before the world premiere of the work, Doura and Roemmers visited 14 Argentine provinces to carry out the discussion "Sinfonía argentina. Importance of music and literature in national culture", passing through Córdoba, Mendoza, San Juan, Río Negro, Misiones, Neuquén, Salta, Jujuy, Buenos Aires and Tierra del Fuego. Sinfonía argentina had its Spanish premiere on 28 May 2022 as part of the Primavera Fest, held in the city of Ávila, Castilla y León. On October 27, 2022, Sinfonía argentina was performed at the National Auditorium of Music in Madrid in a benefit concert in favor of UNICEF, Fundación Querer and Scholas Occurrentes.

In 2023, Doura served as musical director of the show Picasso y la danza. Un encuentro con Lorca en Granada, a project by Carlos Saura with choreographic direction by Andrés Marín, which ran from August 2 to 26 of that year at the Teatro del Generalife, Granada, as part of the XXII edition of the Lorca y Granada festival. The work functions as a tribute to Pablo Picasso and Federico García Lorca, in confluence with flamenco music and dance, featuring leading figures of the genre such as Rocío Molina, Farruquito, Israel Fernández, Ana Morales, Manuel Lombo, Antonio Canales and Manuela Carrasco. Picasso y la danza was Saura's last project before his death, working until two weeks before his death on the show alongside his son, Carlos Saura Medrano, who took over the direction in his absence and stated that his father "left very angry that he could not make it."

Doura also composed the original music for the film Después del final by Argentine director Pablo César, based on the life of cultural personality Luz Fernández Castillo, who plays herself. The film had its world premiere at the Granada International Film Festival - Lorca Awards 2024, and was also part of the official competition at the 39th Mar del Plata International Film Festival. César contacted Fernández Castillo through Doura, as she stated in an interview: "When Pablo César calls me on the phone he says: Mrs. Luz Castillo, I'm speaking to you on behalf of Daniel Doura, who is a very dear friend of mine who lives in Madrid, he is an exceptional musician who is working in Madrid on a television series and with Carlos Saura, no more and no less. I connected Carlos Saura with him. With Daniel one day, talking here about literature, having a coffee, I jokingly answered him with a verse by Federico García Lorca. And he was very impressed. (...) Well, I go to Spain, I meet Carlos Saura, we eat together, Carlos tells me (...) look, I want to make a television series about the life of Federico García Lorca and I would like you to recite. (...) And this crazy Daniel recorded the verses and passed them on to the crazy Pablo César. Except for the Pope and the Queen of England, he must have sent them to everyone, I tell Pablo César, in that call. And he answers me: I have never heard anyone recite like that, so I would like to make a film with you." The collaboration between Doura and Fernández Castillo resulted in the publication of a book, titled Lorca x Luz and published by Luz Fernández Ediciones in 2024. The official presentation of the publisher describes it as a: "Construction that delimits a shared territory between the passionate saying of Luz Castillo, the compositional talent of Daniel Doura and the sublime poetry of Federico García Lorca."

== Selected works ==
- Creator quo est: For Orchestra and Chorus (1981)
- 5 Piano Bagatelles: Piano Solo (1983)
- Quintet 1984: Piano and String Quartet (1984)
- Archi: For Violin and Viola (1984)
- Requiem for Soprano Solo (1985)
- Esdras: Suite for Violin and Orchestra (1985)
- Film scores for directors Amy Goldstein, Rosemary Ricchio, Juan Campanella and Gabriel Garcia (1979–1986)
- Experimental electronic music (1986–1996)
- Visiones patagónicas: Suite for Full Orchestra (1998)
- Invención y fantasías de Morel: Piano sonata n 1. In memoriam Bioy Casares (1998)
- Ficciones porteñas: Piano Sonata n° 2. In memoriam J.L. Borges (2000)
- La pasión de Saverio: Piano Sonata n° 3. In memoriam R. Arlt (2003)
- Más allá del horizonte: Piano Sonata n° 4. In memoriam A. De Raco (2009)
- Cuentos de la selva: Piano Sonata n° 5. In memoriam H. Quiroga (2010)
- Tiempo de luz: Piano Sonata n° 6. In memoriam J. Sibelius (2015)
- Sinfonía nocturna: Chamber orch. For: fl, ob, cl, bsn, hn, harp, strings (2006)
- Sinfonía argentina: For Large Orchestra and Chorus (2009)
- Altas cumbres: Electronic Soundscapes (2010)
- Preludio a Morel: Overture for Orchestra and Electronics (2011)
- Escenas de celos: 11 Miniatures for Piano Solo (2012)
- La pasión del Eternauta: Diptych for Orchestra and Electronics (2013)
- Escenas urbanas: 5 Scenes for Violin and Piano (2014)
- Cantos del más allá: 3 Songs with Text by Alejandro G. Roemmers (2015)
- Cuentos musicales n° 1: For Strings in First position. Beginners (2015)
- Cuentos musicales n° 2: For Strings in First position. Beginners (2015)
- Cuentos musicales n° 3: For Strings in First Position. Beginners (2015)
- Requiem del Plata: Adagio for Strings (2015)
- No Art (Electronics). In memoriam Boris Lurie: 6 Scenes from the Holocaust (2016)
- Suite for Guitar (5 Scenes): «Atlantic Waves», in Memory of Benjamin Britten (2016)
- Sueños de verano: Suite in 3 Movements for Large Orchestra (2017)
- The Sargasso Scenes: Concerto for Violin, Harp, Double Bass and Orchestra (2017)
- Paisajes de los pueblos: Concerto for Guitar and Chamber Orchestra. 5 Movements (2018)
- Verde: Piano Sonata n° 7. In memoriam García Lorca (2019)
- Thoughts to Go (2019)
- Words (2019)
- Tierras del fuego: Sonata for Solo Violin (2019)
- Suite Andalusí n° 1. Escenas de Lorca (2020)
- Suite Andalusí n° 2. Lorca x Luz (Escenas del Romancero) (2020)

== Awards and recognitions ==
Year	Distinction	Awarded by	Nominated work	Result	Ref.
1985	Best Composition	American Society of Composers, Authors and Publishers (ASCAP)	Quintet 1984: Piano and String Quartet	Won	
1985	Best Score	New York University Film Festival	Commercial for Murder (dir. Amy Goldstein)	Won	
1986	Best Composition	American Academy of Arts and Sciences (AAA&S)	Esdras: Suite for Violin and Orchestra	Finalist	
2008	Best Argentine Premiere	Argentine Music Critics Association	Visiones patagónicas	Won	
2017	Gold Disc "Bicentennial Edition"	Uruguayan Chamber of Phonogram Producers	Sinfonía argentina	Won	
2019	Best Argentine Premiere	Argentine Music Critics Association	Sueños de verano	Won	

== See also ==
- Media related to Daniel Doura at Wikimedia Commons
- Chronological list of Argentine classical composers
- List of 20th-century classical composers
- List of 21st-century classical composers
- List of Argentine classical composers
