= Ida Edelvira Rodríguez =

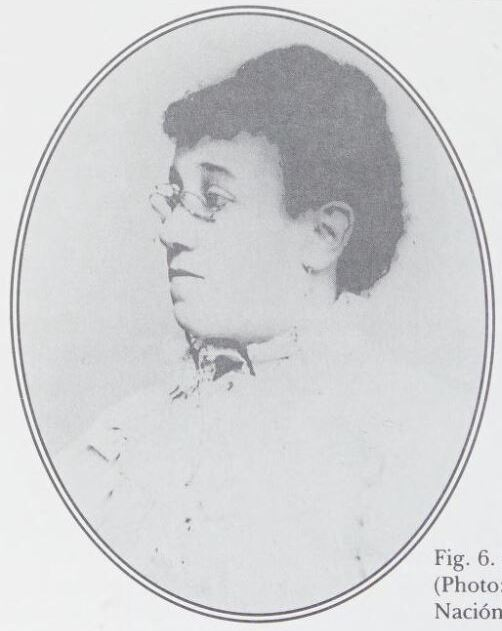
- Born: c. 1860
- Occupation: Poet

Ida Edelvira Rodríguez (born c. 1860) was an Afro-Argentine poet.

Little is known about her life other than that she was the grandchild of slaves and she lived with mother in a conventillo in the San Cristóbal neighborhood of Buenos Aires. She may have been named after Italian opera singer Ida Edelvira, who toured South American in the 1850s. Her race was generally not known at the time as she communicated with editors by mail. Her racial identity was a known point of pride in black Argentine communities, however.

She published a number of poems between 1876 and 1887, mostly in the popular magazine El Álbum del Hogar, and a single book of poetry, La flor de la montaña (The Flower of the Mountain, 1887). Her poems avoid the subjects of love (an incredibly rare choice by a 19th century poet) and autobiography, and instead center on politics, music, mythology, history, nature, and other subjects. Her most popular poem was El mundo de Colón, in praise of Christopher Columbus. She also wrote a Cantata heroica that was set to music by Zenón Rolón.

== Bibliography ==
- La flor de la montaña (The Flower of the Mountain, 1887)
