= Marta Varela =

Argentine composer, pianist, and teacher (born 1943)

Marta Inés Varela (born April 20, 1943) is an Argentine composer, pianist, and teacher.

== Life and career ==
Born in Rosario, Santa Fe, Varela studied piano under Antonio de Raco, chamber music under Simón Blech, and composition and orchestration under Virtú Maragno and Francisco Kröpfl. She is a graduate of the music school at the National University of Rosario, from which she received a degree to teach harmony and composition; she has since served as director and professor at the same school.

With Emma Garmendia, she was the developer of the educación audioperceptiva pedagogical method. As a composer she has written works for a variety of instruments, including chamber pieces and larger-scale works for orchestra.
