= Susana Antón =

Argentine composer and teacher

- Born: August 19, 1947 (age 79)
- Education: National University of Cuyo
- Occupation: Composer Teacher

Susana Antón (born August 19, 1947) is an Argentine composer and teacher.

== Biography ==
Born in Guaymallén Department, Anton studied at the music school of the National University of Cuyo, where her teachers included Miguel Francese and Elifio Rosaenz; she also studied under Jorge Fontenla and Eduardo Tejeda and had lessons in electronic music with Francisco Kröpfl. During her career she has taught at her alma mater and at the National University of San Juan. Her output encompasses several large-scale works, but she has been active as well in the field of chamber music.
