= Hiltrud Kellner =

Hiltrud Kellner, sometimes Hiltrud Kellner de Zozaya (born 1913, date of death unknown) was a Uruguayan composer of Romanian origin.

Kellner was born in Transylvania, which was then part of the Austro-Hungarian Empire. Kellner was married to the Mexican composer Carlos Zozaya, and with him lived in Uruguay for many years. He was among her instructors; other teachers included Enrique Casal Chapí and Héctor Tosar. She composed a number of works for orchestra, including a piano concerto. Kellner is deceased.
