= Silvia Eisenstein =

Silvia Eisenstein (January 5, 1917 - August 13, 1986) was a Venezuelan composer and pianist of Argentine origin. A native of Buenos Aires, she studied music under Ernesto Drangosch, Esperanza Lothringer, and Jorge de Lalewicz; she then, in 1937, entered the musicology department of the Bernardino Rivadavia Natural Sciences Argentine Museum, where she researched folklore under Carlos Vega. She later settled in Caracas. Her output includes chamber and vocal music, as well as the ballet Supay el diablo of 1950. She died in Caracas.
