= Graciela Castillo =

Argentine electroacoustic composer

Graciela Castillo (born 1940) is an Argentine electroacoustic composer.

== Life and career ==
Graciela Castillo was born in Córdoba, Argentina. She was educated in her native city at the Conservsatorio de Musica Juan Sebastian Bach and the National University of Córdoba. Her teachers included composers César Franchisena and Francisco Kröpfl; violinist and conductor Zlatko Topolsky; and composer and pianist Nicolás Alfredo Alessio. She alo studied with Alfredo Luis Nihoul, and Ornella Ballestreri de Devoto.

In the mid-1960s, she was among a group of composers that created the Experimental Music Center (Centro de Música Experimental) at the National University of Córdoba. She composed music at the center, and later took a position as Professor of Composition and Music Analysis at the National University.

== Works ==
Selected works include:

- Concreción 65, concrete music on tape, 1965
- Y así era, for tape, 1982
- Diálogos for two voices, typewriters, radios, and percussion
- Homenaje a Eliot, open work for voices, concrète sounds and music theatre actions, both in 1965
- Colores y masas, concrète music for paintings by José De Monte, in 1966
- Estudio sobre mi voz for tape, 1967
- Estudio sobre mi voz II for tape, 1967
- Tres estudios concretos, for tape, 1967
- El Pozo, original version for voices, two wind instruments, typewriters and percussion, 1968 (the score was published in John Cage's book Notations), second version for instruments and tape, around 1969
- Memorias, a series of three electroacoustic pieces for tape ("La casa grande", "Memorias" and "memorias II"), 1991
- Tierra for tape in 1994
- Iris en los espejos for tape, 1996
- Iris en los espejos II for piano, keyboards and processed sounds, 1996
- De objetos y desvíos for tape, 1998–99
- Los 40 pianos de San Francisco for prepared piano and processed sounds in 1999
- Alma mía for tape in 2000
- Ofrenda for flute and processed sounds, 2001
- Ofrenda II for flute and processed sounds, 2001
- Retorno al fuego, for tape, 2002
- La vuelta (Tango), for tape, 2002
