= Bernarda Fink =

Argentine mezzo-soprano

Bernarda Fink (born 29 August 1955) is an Argentine-Slovenian mezzo-soprano. Born in Buenos Aires to Slovene parents who emigrated from Yugoslavia, Fink studied at the Instituto Superior de Arte del Teatro Colón in Buenos Aires. She won First Prize at the Nuevas Voces Líricas competition in 1985 and moved to Europe. She lives in the southern Austrian province of Carinthia and is married to Valentin Inzko. Her brother is Marcos Fink, a Slovenian classical music singer.

Fink has sung with leading orchestras including the Philharmonics of Vienna and London, Gewandhaus Leipzig, Radio-France Philharmonic, Orchestre National de France, Akademie für Alte Musik Berlin, English Baroque Soloists, I Solisti Veneti, les Musiciens du Louvre, and Musica Antiqua Köln; and has performed under the baton of conductors such as René Jacobs, Philippe Herreweghe, John Eliot Gardiner, Nikolaus Harnoncourt, Trevor Pinnock, Neville Marriner, Marc Minkowski, Roger Norrington, Mariss Jansons, Valery Gergiev, Colin Davis, and Riccardo Muti.

She has performed at the opera houses of Geneva, Prague, Montpellier, Salzburg, Barcelona, Innsbruck, Rennes. Buenos Aires, Amsterdam, she has sung at the Salzburg, Vienna, Prague, Tokyo, Montreux, BBC Proms festivals, as well as the Théâtre des Champs Elysées, Carnegie Hall, Concertgebouw Amsterdam, Vienna Konzerthaus and Sydney Opera House.

She has recorded for Harmonia Mundi and Hyperion Records.

Fink received the Austrian Decoration for Science and Art in 2005.
