= Graciela Paraskevaidis =

Argentine writer and composer (1940–2017)

Graciela Paraskevaidis (1 April 1940 – 21 February 2017) was an Argentine writer and composer of Greek ancestry who lived and worked in Uruguay.

== Life ==
Graciela Paraskevaidis was born in Buenos Aires. She studied composition at the National Conservatory in Buenos Aires with Roberto García Morillo and at the Instituto Torcuato Di Tella with Gerardo Gandini and Iannis Xenakis from 1965 to 1966 with a scholarship from the Centro Latinoamericano de Altos Estudios Musicales (CLAEM). She continued her studies at the Musikhochschule Freiburg/Breisgau with Wolfgang Fortner from 1968 to 1971 with a grant from the Deutscher Akademischer Austauschdienst. She studied at Darmstadt in 1972.

After completing her studies, Parakevaidis took a position at the Universidad Nacional in Montevideo where she taught from 1985 to 1992 and also worked as a composer. Her works have been performed internationally in Europe, Asia and the Americas. She has written two books La obra sinfónica de Eduardo Fabini published in 1992 and Luis Campodónico, compositor published in 1999, and a number of articles on 20th-century Latin-American music published in the journals Pauta, Mexico, and MusikTexte, Germany. She published a translation of Schoenbergs Zeichen by Jean-Jacques Dünki in 2005.

Paraskevaídis served as co-editor of World New Music Magazine and the yearbook of ISCM. She was an organizer of the Latin American Contemporary Music Courses (CLAMC) from 1975 to 1989. With Max Nyffeler, she co-founded the website latinoamérica música in 2004 and has served co-editor. She holds both Argentinean and Uruguayan citizenship, and has lived in Uruguay since 1975.

She was married to musicologist Coriún Aharonián.

== Honors and awards ==
- Residency at Berliner Künstlerprogramm of the Deutscher Akademischer Austauschdienst (1984)
- Goethe Medal from the Goethe-Institut in Munich (1994)
- Attended the First Symposium of Artists and Intellectuals of Greek Origin (1985) on an invitation from the Government of Greece
- Award from the Argentine National Endowment for the Arts
- Award from the City of Buenos Aires
- Award from the Akademie der Künste in Berlin
- Award from the Young Musicians of Uruguay
- Morosoli Silver Award (Morosoli) from the Fundación Lolita Rubial in Minas, Uruguay (2006)

== Works ==
Paraskevaídis composes mostly for chamber ensemble, choral, vocal, and piano performance. Selected works include:

- Aphorismen(text by Karl Kraus), 2 speakers, piano, percussion, tape, 1969
- Mozart (text by Wolfgang Amadeus Mozart), actor, ensemble, 1970–72
- magma I, 4 French horns, 2 Trumpets, 2 trombones, tuba, 1965-67 *magma II, 4 trombones, 1968
- Trio, flute, clarinet, bassoon, 1969
- Mellonta tauta, accordion, 1970
- magma III, flute, trombone, cello, piano, 1974
- magma IV, string quartet, 1974
- magma V, 4 kena (Andean flutes), 1977
- todavía no, 3 flutes, 3 clarinets, 1979
- magma VI, 2 Trumpets, 2 Trombones, 1979
- más fuerza tiene, clarinet, 1984
- magma VII, 14 winds, 1984
- dos piezas para pequeño conjunto, oboe, clarinet, trumpet, piano, claves, 1989
- sendas, flute, oboe, clarinet, bassoon, French horn, trumpet, trombone, piano, 1992
- el nervio de arnold, guitar, 1992
- algún sonido de la vida, 2 oboes, 1993
- ta, flute, oboe, clarinet, piano, 1994
- No quiero oír ya más campanas, 14 winds, 1995
- dos piezas para oboe y piano, 1995
- hacen así, 6 percussion, 1996
- altibajos, 2 double basses, 1996
- libres en el sonido presos en el sonido, flute (+ alto flute), clarinet, 1997
- La terra e la morte (text by Cesare Pavese), mixed chorus, 1968 *libertà goes by ... (Text by Dante Alighieri), mixed chorus, 1969
- E Desidero only colori (text by Cesare Pavese), female chorus, 1969
- Die Hand voller Stunden (text by Paul Celan), 9 mixed voices, 1970
- Schattenreich (text by Hans Magnus Enzensberger), 4 mixed voices, 1972
- der Weg (text from the Old Testament), 9 mixed voices, brass ensemble, 1973
- the outcry, mixed chorus, 1987
- discord, 9 mixed voices, 1998
- replication, harpsichord, 2006
- huauqui, tape, 1975
- A entera revisación del público en general, tape, 1978–81
