= Irma Urteaga =

Argentinian composer and pianist (1929–2022)

Irma Urteaga (March 7, 1929 – February 14, 2022) was a composer and pianist from Argentina.

== Biography ==
Irma Urteaga was born in San Nicholas, Buenos Aires. She began her studies in Paraná (Entre Ríos) and continued in Buenos Aires with Lucrecia María Madariaga Gilardi, Josefa Hernandorena and Jorge Fanelli for piano and Beatriz Gilardo Henandorena y Gilardi for harmony. She graduated in piano in 1959, and continued studying at the same school, graduating in composition in 1971. Her teachers for composition were Roberto Caamaño and Valdo Sciammarella, for instrumentation was Roberto García Morillo, and for history and aesthetics, Carlos Sufern and Alicia Terzian.

After ending her studies, Urteaga performed as a concert musician and taught harmony at the Conservatorio Nacional de Música Carlos López Buchardo and operatic repertoire, vocal negotiation analysis and opera at the Instituto Superior de Arte del Teatro Colón. She was Columbus Theatre International Master (1974–1977) and director of an Opera Workshop in 1984. She was hired by the Opera Foundation of Ecuador to organize the lyrics for performances in Quito, Guayaquil and Cuenca from 1986-1988.

Urteaga has been the recipient of a number of composition and achievement awards. She has been Deputy Secretary (1973–1980), Second Vice President (1997–2000) and First Vice President (2001–2003) of the Argentina Association of Composers, Registrar of the Argentine Council of Music (CAMU, 1985–1993 and an Active Member of the United Composers of Argentina (CUDA, 1986–2005). She also served as Vice President of the Argentine Forum of Composers (FADEC).

== Works ==
Urteaga began composing as a student at the National Conservatory. Selected works include:

- Variations and Toccata (1968)
- Sonata (1968)
- String Quartet (1969)
- Fields (1970)
- Existential (1974)
- Expectation (1977), for soprano and mixed choir a capella
- Still, Canto I
- Already Yerma Dreams (1986–1987)
- The Maldol (1987–1990) opera, libretto by Alberto González Liliana *Dimant and Ledo
- The births (1992)
- Variations on a Theme of Beatrice Sosnik (1997)
