= Ernesto Drangosch =

Argentine pianist and composer (1882–1925)

Ernesto Drangosch (22 January 1882, in Buenos Aires – 26 June 1925) was an Argentine pianist and composer. He was a student of Alberto Williams.

He was born Ernst Otto Paul Richard Drangosch in Buenos Aires to German immigrant parents. His parents were Friederich Carl Drangosch and Augusta Emilia Inés Schneider, from Berlin.

He was the professor of Carlo Vidussi, who later on was Maurizio Pollini's teacher. Another pupil was Silvia Eisenstein.

== Works, editions, and recordings ==
- Criolla overture 1920
- Sechs lieder op. 4
- Fier lieder op. 9
- Drei Lieder – Trois mélodies op. 19
