= Ana Morales =

Spanish flamenco dancer and choreographer

Ana Morales Moreno (born 1982, in Barcelona, Spain), known as Ana Morales, is a Spanish flamenco dancer and choreographer, who has established her own dance company.

She began her dance studies at the Conservatory in Barcelona. Her father was from Seville and her mother was from Melilla. When she was 16 she was awarded a three-year-scholarship by the Andalusian Dance Company (Compañía Andaluza de Danza, CAD) in Seville that was directed and coordinated by José Antonio Ruiz. She continued her flamenco studies there and received lessons by flamenco lecturers and dancers like Rafael Campallo, Alejandro Granados, Juana Amaya, Eva la Yerbabuena, Isabel Bayón and Andrés Marín, among others.

== Career ==
Ana Morales started her professional career in the Teatro de La Maestranza during the Bienal de Sevilla 2000 with the show Puntales, directed by Antonio “El Pipa”. In 2001 she joined the Compañía Andaluza de Danza (CAD) and toured national and international theaters and festivals for four years with the following shows: Encuentros, Picasso, Paisajes, José Antonio Ruiz's La Leyenda, Javier Latorre's Cosas de Payos and Antonio Gade's Bodas de Sangre.

In 2004 she was part of a project in honor of Dalí directed by José Antonio Ruiz and produced by the regional government of Andalusia (Junta de Andalucía) and a series of national festivals. She also performed at the Festival de Peralada, Festival de Santander and Festival de San Sebastian. In November, she traveled to Japan to teach flamenco dance lessons and to work in several theaters.

In 2005, she collaborated as a dancer in the film Iberia, by Carlos Saura, and ¿Por qué se frotan las patitas? by Álvaro Bejines. She also worked as part of Javier Latorre's company in the show Triana, en el nombre de la rosa, during the Festival de Jerez de la Frontera (Cadiz); and in Andres Marín's company in his show Asimetrías. She also took part in several national and international festivals like Alburquerque or London. In 2007, she worked as a solo dancer in Javier Barón's Meridiana, debuting in the Festival de Jerez, Mont Marsan and theaters of Madrid and Seville.

In 2008 she took part of the flamenco show Kahlo Caló by Amador Rojas, premiered at the Teatro Villamarta in Jerez de la Frontera and inspired by the life and work of the universal Mexican painter Frida Kahlo which was also presented at the Bienal de Sevilla. She performed as a solo dancer in the same theater with the show Tiempo Pasado, directed by Juan Dolores Caballero "El Chino".

In 2010 she premiered her first production: De Sandalia a Tacón, in Sala Compañía theatre, as part of the program of the Festival Flamenco de Jerez de la Frontera (Cadiz). This show is inspired by the arrival of the gypsies to the Iberian Peninsula and recreates the dance of the "puella gaditanae" or Cadiz dancers of the 2nd century BC. She also participated in the XII Festival Internacional de Teatro de Bogotá, with the show Flamenco Actual, which was represented at the XVI Bienal de Flamenco de Sevilla too. In the same edition she performed as a solo dancer in Javier Barón's show Vaivenes, and with Rubén Olmo in Tranquilo Alboroto.

On 10 September 2012 she premiered her second solo show titled reciclARTE at the Centro Andaluz de Arte Contemporáneo (CAAC), within the program of the XVII edition of the Bienal de Flamenco de Sevilla. The show's concept was to "Reuse" all possible elements, whether material or not, and create "something new" from "something old". In this show, the artist used four costumes made by students of the CEADE design school who used materials such as paper, plastic, metal and burlap in a way to produce ethical fashion, which recycles materials to give them a new use.

In 2013 she participated as solo dancer in the Festival Internacional de Música y Danza de Granada with the show Flamenco Hoy, directed by Carlos Saura. This show was premiered in 2009 in the Veranos de la Villa de Madrid festival. It was Saura's tribute to flamenco and to flamenco dancer (bailaor) and choreographer Antonio Gades, as well as to flamenco singers (cantaores) Manolo Caracol and Antonio Mairena.

In September 2014, she danced in the show Lo cortés no quita lo gallardo, by Jose Maria Gallardo Del Rey, during the III Festival Internacional de Música de Cámara Ciutat de Cullera.

On 6 November 2014 she presented her third show called Callejón del agua, a production in which she compiles events of different shows and of her life, accompanied by flamenco singers Juan Jose Amador and Miguel Ortega, guitar player Jesus Guerrero and percussion player Jorge Pérez "El Cubano".

On 13 September 2015 she premiered the show Los Pasos Perdidos in the Torre de Don Fadrique (Seville) theatre. The show was described as a "suite of dances without a storyline where the whole technique is at the service of feeling."

Until 2016 she has been a solo dancer in the Ballet Flamenco de Andalucía company, directed by Rafaela Carrasco.

On 3 March 2017 she collaborated with David Coria's company in the show El Encuentro at the XXI edition of the Festival de Jerez.

On 21 March 2017 she performed at the Teatro Central in Seville in the 20th edition of Flamenco Viene del Sur, sponsored by the Culture Department of Andalusia (Consejería de Cultura), with the show Una Mirada lenta, which portrays her 15 years of work in the world of Flamenco dance, since here beginnings with Antonio "El Pipa". For that show, she had David Coria as a guest artist.

== Awards ==
Ana Morales won the first prize of “Malagueñas” free dance in the “Baile Flamenco de La Perla de Cádiz” national contest.

In August 2009 she was awarded another prize, “El Desplante”, in the dance category of the XLIX Edition of the Festival Internacional de Cante de las Minas de la Unión, Murcia.

== See also ==
- Cante flamenco
