= Marcos Fink =

Argentine-Slovenian opera singer

Marcos Fink (born 26 November 1950 in Buenos Aires, Argentina) is an Argentine-Slovenian singer of classical music. He was a member of various vocal groups in Argentina, and began his solo singing career in 1985. He was educated by many European maestros: Wolfgang Schöne (Bach Academy Stuttgart), Philippe Huttenlocher, Aldo Baldin, Eric Werba, and Guillermo Opitz.

His sister is Bernarda Fink, also a classical music singer.
