= Héctor Tosar =

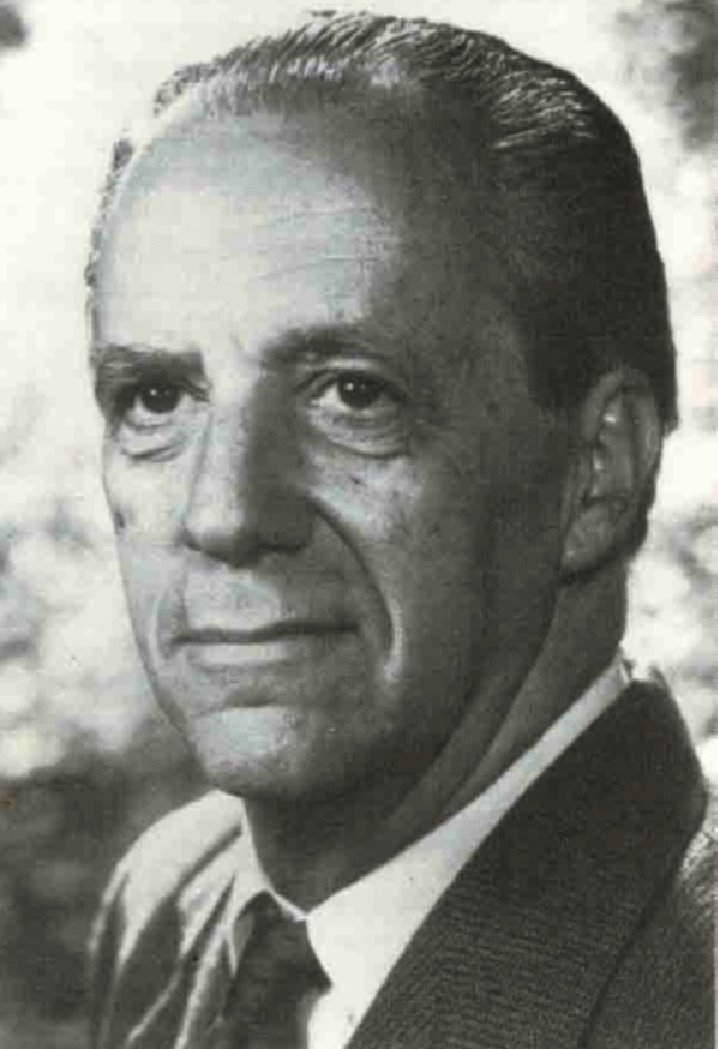
Héctor Tosar in the 1960s

Héctor Alberto Tosar Errecart (Montevideo, Uruguay, 18 July 1923 - Montevideo, 17 January 2002) was a Uruguayan pianist and classical composer. He also taught; among his pupils was Hiltrud Kellner.
