= Maria Teresa Luengo =

Argentine composer and musicologist

Maria Teresa Luengo (born 25 November 1940) is an Argentine composer and musicologist.

== Life ==
Luengo was born in Quilmes, Buenos Aires, Argentina, and graduated from the Pontifical Catholic University of Argentina in Buenos Aires in 1969, where she studied with Alberto Ginastera, Luis Gianneo, Juan Francisco Giacobbe, Roberto Caamaño and Gerardo Gandini. In 1973 she was awarded a scholarship that allowed her to continue her studies in electro-acoustic music with Francisco Krópfl, Gerardo Gandini, Femando Von Reichenbach, Gabriel Bmcyc, and Peter Maxwell Davies at the Center of Art and Communication (CAYC). During this time she was invited to participate in a year-long seminar on contemporary music during which she composed The Book of Mirrors.

From 1974 to 1975 she taught at the University of El Salvador, and in 1984 began teaching composition at the National University of La Plata. From 1972 to 1993, she also taught at the Municipal School of Fine Arts Carlos Morel of Quilmes. In 1990 she designed the curriculum for study in Electroacoustic Music at the National University of Quilmes and worked as director and professor of composition within the program.

== Honors and awards ==
- First prize in Composition from Musical Promotions, 1971
- First prize in Composition from the City of Buenos Aires, 1973
- Scholarship in Composition from Argentina's National Endowment for the Arts
- Prize in Composition from the National University of La Plata, 1983
- Special Mention from the National Endowment for the Arts in the Juan Carlos Paz Competition
- The National Endowment for the Arts recognition for composers under thirty-five years, 1988
- Her work Presences was selected and interpreted in the third conference of Contemporary Latin American Music Composers, 1989
- Her music for the film Taumanía from the filmmaker Pablo Delfini on the Tau Ricardo drawings won First Prize of the National Endowment for the Arts, 1987.

== Works ==
Selected works include:

- Sonata for Piano, 1965
- Heptatonic for flute, clarinet, string quartet and piano, 1970
- Seis Preludios Para Cuarteto de Cuerdas for string quartet, 1968
- Alcances for string quartet and piano, 1971
- Dueto, for violin and piano, 1972
- Cuatro Soles for flute, oboe, cello, piano and percussion, 1973
- Absolum electronic work, about 1973
- El Museo Imaginario, for violin, viola, cello, piano and instruments of persecution, 1975
- Mailenanas three pieces for piano, 1976
- El Libro de los Espejos, stopped flute, clarinet, violin, viola, cello, piano and percussion, 1976
- Seis Imágenes Mágicas, for flute, clarinet, cello and percussion, 1978
- Presencias, trio for flute, violin and piano, 1980
- Navegante for piano and six percussionists, 1983
- Nao for wind quintet, 1983
- Ecos por Tupac trio in G for flute, bass clarinet, cello, 1984
- Las Aguas de la Luz for two flutes in C, bass clarinet, violin and cello, 1989
- Saltos Transparentes for piano, 1990
- Music for the film Taumanía, 1987
