= María Isabel Siewers =

Argentine guitarist

María Isabel Siewers (born October 22, 1950) is an Argentine classical guitarist.

A pupil of María Luisa Anido, her international performance career began after winning the 2nd Prize at the Concours International de Guitarre de Paris in 1974.

María Isabel Siewers has performed in Wigmore Hall (London), the Vienna Konzerthaus, Martinu Hall (Prague), Carnegie Hall (New York), the Théâtre des Champs Elysées (Paris), she has played in many important music festivals and has appeared as soloist with, amongst others, the Argentine National Symphony Orchestra, the Prague Virtuosi, the Radio/TV Orchestra of Zagreb, the Bohemian Chamber Orchestra, the National Symphony Orchestra of Cuba, the Kraków Philharmonic, and the Chamber Orchestras of Mayo and Morón (Argentina).

She has regularly toured, taught, and served in juries for international competitions throughout Europe, North and South America, Australia, and New Zealand.

Isabel has occupied several teaching posts in Argentina and, since 1989, she has been head of a guitar department in the Mozarteum University of Salzburg, Austria.

In seeking to expand the repertory of the guitar she has commissioned new works and has premiered numerous solo and chamber works and concertos

Pieces written for Isabel Siewers include:

- Sylvie Bodorova: Gypsy ballad (Guitar solo), Concierto de Estío (Guitar and strings)
- José Luis Campana: Tres Piezas
- Jorge Cardoso: Preludio y danza (guitar solo)
- John Duarte: Sonatina del Sur (guitar solo)
- Marios Elias Jounnou: Quartetto per due (violin and guitar), “La Caja” (performer and guitar)
- Gustavo Kantor: Vidala (guitar solo)
- Sergio Parotti: Quintet for guitar and strings
- Máximo Diego Pujol: Elegía (guitar solo)
