= Marcela Pavia =

Italian-American composer (born 1957)

Marcela Pavia (born 1957) is an Italian-American composer.

== Life ==
Marcela Pavia was born in Argentina of Italian descent, and also maintains Italian citizenship. She studied composition at the National University of Rosario in Argentina with Dante Grela, Francisco Kröpfl, and Franco Donatoni. She also studied in Milan, Biella and Academy Chigi of Siena, studying with Georgy Ligeti, Ennio Morricone and Henri Pousseur. She was artist-in-residence at the Virginia Center for the Creative Arts in the United States.

After receiving her degree, Pavia worked as a composer and taught music at the Universidad Nacional de Rosario, Manuel de Falla Conservatory in Buenos Aires, Universidad del Museo Social Argentino and the Universidad del Salvador in Buenos Aires. Her music has been performed internationally.

Pavia has published articles in Codex XXI magazine, published by the Associació Música Tell (MIC) of Barcelona, and in Conceptos magazine, published by the Universidad del Museo Social Argentino (UMSA) in Buenos Aires. She has also published books of teaching repertoire.

== Honors and awards ==
Marcela Pavia has won awards in competitions including:

- 7th International Paul Barson Guitar Composition Competition
- Dundee Guitar Festival
- 6th Onde Musicali Composition Competition in Taranto
- International Composition Competition
- Execution for Percussion Instruments and Drums of the Percussive Arts Society 2007, Italy

== Works ==
Pavia composes mostly for chamber ensemble and instruments. Selected works include:

- De Puna y Pampas: Argentine folk music for two guitars
- Suite Tupac Amaru for two guitars
- Ondine for clarinet and bass, 2005
- Dos para epigrafes El General Lavalle piano four hands, 2004
- Shalott for 12 instruments, 1993
- Fideal for solo guitar, 2005
- Solentiname for clarinet and guitar
- Nayla for solo flute

=== Discography ===
- Portraits of Berben, contains "Fideal" and "Malambo" for solo guitar, IGS Bèrben of Ancona
- Masterworks of the New Era Vol 7 Kiev Philharmonic Orchestra, ERMmedia (USA), contains "Sinclair" for flute, vibraphone, marimba and cello
