= Sergio Calligaris =

Argentine pianist and composer (1941-2023)

Sergio Calligaris (22 January 1941 - 9 November 2023) was an Argentine pianist, composer and piano teacher. After living and tutoring in the United States, where he gained his doctorate in music, Calligaris established his residence in Italy in 1974.

== The pianist ==
Calligaris was born in Rosario, Argentina. His career as a performer started at the age of thirteen. He pursued his studies under the guidance of such masters as Jorge Fanelli, Arthur Loesser, Adele Marcus, Nikita Magaloff, and Guido Agosti.

Calligaris' technique is characterised by the sheer brilliance and powerful touch typical of the Leschetizky school; his technical qualities, complemented by a detailed attention to the composition’s form, made him a fine interpreter of both romantic (especially Schumann and Chopin) and post-romantic (Rachmaninoff, Scriabin, Debussy) repertoire.

Calligaris has performed in prestigious concert-halls such as the Konzertsaal Bundesallee in Berlin, the Auditorium of S. Cecilia in Rome, the Musikverein Brahms-Saal in Vienna, and as a soloist in his own Concerto for piano and orchestra op. 29 at the Main Theatre of Manila.

He has recorded, among others, for EMI, Orion Records and the Ares-Libreria Editrice Vaticana; the latter, a few years ago, released a compilation entitled Sergio Calligaris: composer and interpreter to celebrate the twenty-fifth year of his recording debut.

- A list of Calligaris' recordings (with musical excerpts) can be found at: Discography
- Reviews of Calligaris as a performer can be found at: Piano reviews

== The composer ==
Calligaris turned back to composition around the end of the 1970s, after some twenty years spent performing. One of his earliest works, Renzo's piano notebook, Op. 7 (written in 1978), has since become a widely executed contemporary piano piece. In this oeuvre featuring ten short and well-characterised pictures, all qualities of Calligaris’ music can already be singled out:

  - the vivid opposition between "elegiac" and "flamboyant and wild" themes
  - a dramatic use of rhythm
  - a disciplined and, at the same time, extremely complex master of counterpoint
  - the adoption of "classical" composing forms (see, just as an example, the use of form in the Prelude, choral, double fugue and finale op. 19).

Beside the production for piano (which ultimately led to a fruitful cooperation with pianist and director Vladimir Ashkenazy), Calligaris wrote for a variety of instruments (voice, cello, trumpet, organ, clarinet, flute, violin, horn) and for both chamber and symphonic orchestras. The majority of his compositions have been recorded by several artists. In 2007, Sergio Calligaris has been awarded the International Prize "Giuseppe Verdi" in recognition of his activity as both performer and composer.

Calligaris' composition are published by Carisch. Between 2008 and 2009, Carisch has issued four anthological volumes entitled Piano Parnassum, which collect most of his works for piano (the fourth volume includes compositions for four hands).

- A complete list of all Calligaris' compositions (with en extensive collection of musical excerpts) can be found at: Catalogue
- Reviews of Calligaris’ work can be found at: Reviews
- Interviews with the composer are available at: Interviews

== The teacher ==
Sergio Calligaris taught both in the United States (Cleveland Institute of Music, California State University at Los Angeles) and in Italy (Conservatorio di Napoli, Pescara and L’Aquila). He has been member of juries in several prestigious piano competitions.

- Sergio Calligaris' full biography is available at: Biography
