= Rosita Melo =

Argentine-Uruguayan pianist, composer and poet

- Born: Clotilde Mela Rosa Luciano; July 9, 1897; Montevideo, Uruguay
- Died: August 12, 1981 (aged 84) Buenos Aires, Argentina
- Genres: Tango, Waltz, Creole Waltz, Pasodoble, Polka, March
- Occupations: Composer, pianist, poet, writer

Clotilde Mela Rosa Luciano, better known as Rosita Melo (July 9, 1897 – August 12, 1981), was an Argentine-Uruguayan pianist, composer and poet. She is the author of the famous vals criollo (Creole Waltz) "Desde el alma" for which she is known as the first widely recognized female Rioplatense Hispanic composer in the world.

== Family life ==
Rosita Melo was born in Montevideo on July 9, 1897, as the youngest child of Italian immigrants Michele Mela and Rosa Luciano de Mela, from Rionero in Vulture, Basilicata. She was baptized at the cathedral of Montevideo. Shortly after, the family migrated to Argentina in 1900. They settled in Buenos Aires when Rosita was three years old. On February 23, 1922, she married the young poet and writer Victor Piuma Vélez who would write the lyrics for all her compositions.

== Musical influence ==
Melo showed a great talent for music. At the age of four, she could already play the piano by ear. Once in primary school, she never gave up her music studies. She later studied piano in Buenos Aires and ultimately became a professor of piano and concert at the prestigious Thibaud-Piazzini conservatory.

== Works ==
Throughout her life, she created a body of work that includes tango, waltz, classical and Creole (vals criollo) waltzes, pasodobles, polkas and marches. Among them: "Oración", "Tatita" and "Aquel entonces" as well as the waltzes "Yo te adoro", "Por el camino", "Una lágrima para papá", "Cuando de ti ya lejos" and "Aquellos catorce años".

The poems of Melo were published in newspapers and cultural magazines of her time. Her poems were published in the book "Antología de poetas jóvenes" ("Anthology of Young Poets") alongside those of Alfonsina Storni and other famous contemporary poets. She gave many concerts of both classical and popular music in different cultural centers in Buenos Aires, earning medals and awards. She was appointed as a representative of music in a ceremony held at the Teatro Colón in Buenos Aires.

=== Desde el Alma ===
In 1911, at the age of 14, Melo composed her first and now world-famous Boston-style vals criollo "Desde el Alma" ("From the Soul"). Other sources date the composition between 1911 and 1917. Melo is quoted saying it was the work of an adolescent. The waltz's theme is dedicated to the love of a mother. Vélez would write the first set of lyrics for it, years later.

By 1921, Roberto Firpo had recorded four instrumental waltzes of Melo. In 1948, Homero Manzi wanted to include the waltz in the movie "Pobre mi madre querida", but with different lyrics rewritten by himself which would be sung by Hugo del Carril.

Vélez and Melo initially opposed the idea, and requested that if Manzi wrote new lyrics, Vélez's name should be included as co-author. Manzi ultimately agreed, the lyrics became famous and the waltz, already a classic by the time, became universally famous.

Manzi's lyrics remain the most famous ones and are often reinterpreted in different versions of the song when performed by other musicians:

Soul, if they have hurt you so much

Why do you refuse to forget?

Why do you prefer

to cry for what you've lost

to look for what you've wanted

to call for what has died?

You live needlessly sad

and I know that you never deserved

to redeem with sorrow

the blame of being good,

as good as you were, for love.

It was what once began

what later ceased to be.

What at the end, for the fault of a mistake

was a bitter night for the heart.

Forget those letters!

Come back to your old dream.

Together with the pain

that opens a wound

life arrives, bringing love.

You live needlessly sad

and I know that you never deserved

to redeem with sorrow

the blame of being good,

as good as you were, for love

== Death ==
After her husband died in 1976, Melo died in Buenos Aires on August 12, 1981, and was buried at the "Rincón de las Personalidades" ("Corner of Personalities") in the Chacarita Cemetery there. Her two daughters had a monument erected in her memory there.
