= Nelly Moretto =

Argentine composer and pianist (1925–1978)

- Born: 20 September 1925; Rosario, Santa Fe Province, Argentina
- Died: 24 November 1978 (aged 53); Buenos Aires, Argentina
- Occupations: Composer, pianist

Nelly Moretto (20 September 1925 – 24 November 1978) was an Argentine composer and pianist who is considered to be an innovator of electronic music in South America. She also served as the vice-president of the Agrupación Nueva Música from 1970.

== Early life and education ==
Nelly Moretto was born in Rosario, Argentina on 20 September 1925. She attended the Musical Professorship School in Rosario. Subsequently, she studied at the National Conservatory and the Torcuato di Tella Institute in Buenos Aires, and then at the University of Illinois. Upon her return to Argentina after finishing university, she began creating her own chamber and symphonic music compositions. At the same time, she was taught contemporary music techniques by composer Juan Carlos Paz.

== Career ==
In 1951, she joined the Agrupación Nueva Música, which had been created by her former teacher Juan Carlos Paz, and was considered one of its most active members. Moretto eventually became the group's vice-president in 1970, and served in that role until her death in 1978.

During the 1960s, she began working at the University of Buenos Aires electronic institute, Estudio de Fonología Musical, where she began to experiment with combining traditional electroacoustic techniques with traditional practices. At the studio, she created Composición 9a in 1965 for magnetic tape, dance, lights, and traditional instruments. This was followed by Composición 9b in 1966, also using magnetic tape, and the 1967 piece Coribattenti for string quartet and tape. Due to these compositions and experiments, Moretto became known as an innovator of electronic music in South America.

== Death ==
Moretto died in Buenos Aires on 24 November 1978, at the age of 53.

== Works ==
Selected works include:

- Composición 9a for two instrumental groups, tape, dance and lights, 1965
- Composición 9b for tape, 1966
- Coribattenti for string quartet and tape, 1967
- Composición No.13: In Memorian J. C. Paz for trumpet and tape, 1972
- Composición No.14: Bah! le dije al tiempo for violin, trumpet, piano and tape, 1974/1975
