= José Antonio Bottiroli =

Argentine composer and pianist

Jose Antonio Bottiroli
- Born: Jose Antonio Bottiroli; January 1, 1920; Rosario, Argentina
- Died: March 15, 1990 (aged 70); Rosario, Argentina
- Education: National University of the Littoral
- Known for: Classical music composition and poetry
- Notable work: 112 musical composition and 84 poems
- Movement: Late Romanticism and early Impressionism
- Awards: Rotary Club Rosario

José Antonio Bottiroli (January 1, 1920 – March 15, 1990) was an Argentine classical music composer and poet.

== Biography ==
José Antonio Bottiroli was born in Rosario, Argentina on 1 January 1920 and died in Rosario on 15 March 1990. From the time he was a young child and until the end of his life, he lived alternately in Rosario and in Los Cocos, a hill town retreat located in Córdoba Province, Argentina. He studied with Nicolás Alfredo Alessio (1919–1985). In 1948 he graduated from the School of Professors No. 2 Juan María Gutiérrez of the National University of the Littoral with a professorship degree in music and received the Rotary Club Award for the best music student.

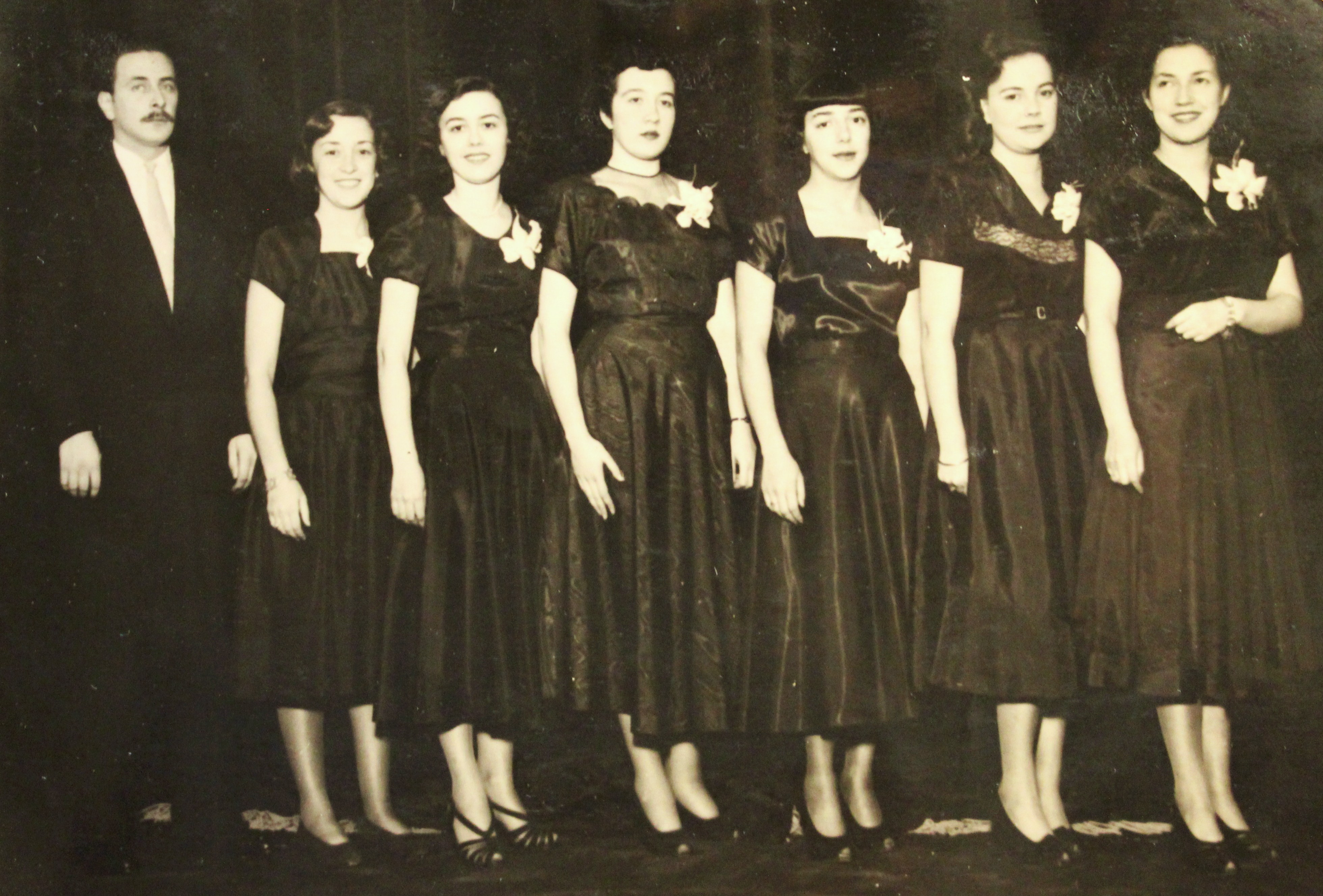
Sexteto Loreley

He was the director of the Vocal Women's Sextet Juan María Gutiérrez, later Vocal Sextet Loreley, with which he conducted performances in the City of Rosario, Radio LR1 El Mundo and at the Cervantes Theatre (Buenos Aires).

He composed Belgrano March – Song with lyrics by Ernesto Aturo Sánchez Queirolo. In 1960 Belgrano March – Song was approved by decree of the National Board of Education and the General Board of Education of the Santa Fe Province to be incorporated in the music repertoire of the schools of Argentina and those of the Province of Santa Fe. Also, by municipal decree of the City of Rosario, Belgrano March-Song was declared the official song of the City, to be sung in ceremonies at the National Flag Memorial in commemoration of the creation of the Flag of Argentina and in memory of General Manuel Belgrano. Belgrano March-Song is the only musical work dedicated to General Manuel Belgrano, creator of the Argentine flag. It was premiered on 11 May 1962 by the Military Institute Choir and the Infantry Regiment No. 12 General Arenales's brass band conducted by Captain Antonio Rabuffetti.

As a pianist, Bottiroli performed in solo recitals and in chamber music duets with violist Oscar Costa, cellist Pedro Farruggia, soprano Gabriela Moner, contralto Azucena Racca de Deseta, and in piano duets with Jacinto Terán Fernández and Nicolás A. Alessio.

On 4 October 1951 he conducted the Rosario Symphony Orchestra at El Circulo Theater on which occasion he gave the American premier of Concerto for Oboe and Orchestra by Nicólas A. Alessio and the Festive Mass Opus 154 by Alexandre Gretchaninov.

In 1962 Bottiroli was awarded the Crisol Music Competition Award of Rosario and in 1963 composed the hymn of the School St. Antonio Maria Gianelli of Rosario with lyrics by Minerva Marchiori de Bruno. In 1970 he received a scholarship from the Institute of Hispanic Culture to study in Europe, first in Madrid, later in Barcelona, Spain, and finally in Rome, Italy, where two of his chamber music compositions were premiered: Trio for Wind Instruments and String Quartet.

José Antonio Bottiroli was the Dean of the Normal School of Teachers No. 3 and College Commerce General Belgrano of Rosario. In addition to teaching music at the National College No.1, the Sagrado Corazón College in Rosario, he taught music to the inmates at the prison of the City of Rosario. José Antonio Bottiroli composed 113 works of music: 70 piano works, 23 chamber music works, 8 choral works and 12 symphonic works. His complete works were compiled and catalogued in 2011 by Fabio Banegas. In addition to his musical output he composed 84 poems and diverse poetic writings.

== Music ==
After an initial period in which he composed works influenced by Argentine folk music, such as his Pequeña Suite Norteña B-2 for orchestra and Carnavalito B-4 and Vidalita B-14 for choir, José Antonio Bottiroli's music adhered to the Romanticism and late Romanticism. For his piano output he adopted as a main formal structure the Romantic microform in which he expressed his own subjectivity within the context of three-part compositions. His piano repertoire is distinguished by its improvisational character and hand extension while his orchestral works follow the symphonic poem narrative established by Franz Liszt. Harmonically, his music ventures into the rich late Romantic textures and the atmospheric colors of the Impressionist music. The musical production of José Antonio Bottiroli must be viewed within the context of his complete collected artistic output, which includes an extensive number of poems and writings.

== Discography ==
- Jose Antonio Bottiroli, Complete Piano Works 1: Waltzes. Fabio Banegas, Piano. Released by Naxos - Grand Piano, March 2020. World premier.

== Works ==
Selection of works by Bottiroli:

=== Piano ===
- Waltz in G major. B-22
- Waltz in E minor True. B-26
- Theme and Variations in G major. B-27
- Waltz in F minor Chopin. B-29
- Strange. B-30
- Image. B -31
- Kirigami. B-32
- Eros. B-33
- Forgotten Doll. B-34
- Memento. B-35
- Etopeya Waltz in G♭ major Mario. B-36
- Poem in D-Mayor. B-37
- Capriccio in D major. B-41
- Microwaltzes. B-42
- Waltz in D major. B-43
- Capriccio in E♭ minor. B-44
- Album leaf I in G♭ Mayor. B-45
- Waltz in D minor Inspired. B-46
- Album leaf II in D major. B-47
- Album leaf III in D minor. B-48
- Album leaf IV in F major. B-49
- Minute. B-50
- Etude 7. B-51
- Toccata en E minor. B-52
- Sad. B-53
- Intimate. B-54
- Album leaf V in B minor Nocturnalia. B-55
- Album leaf VI in F minor. B-56
- Nocturne in G♭ minor. B-58
- Monologue. B-59
- Waltz in G minor. B-60
- Prelude in F minor. B-61
- Waltz in D♭ major. B-62
- Waltz in B minor. B-63
- Piruchín (Leaf). B-64
- Andante ¾ Malinconico. B-65
- Waltz in F major. B-66
- 5 Microfilms. B-67
- Invisible Bird Crespín. B-68
- How is it? . . . B-69
- Reply I (a“How is it”). B-70
- Reply II (“Nocturne . . .”). B-71
- Waltz Test in A♭ major. B-72
- Improvisation Autumn. B-74
- Album Leaf. B-75
- 6 Piano Pieces. B-76
- Untitled – Adagio. B-77
- New. B-78
- Old. B-79
- Allegro risoluto, andante, mesto, aninato. B-80
- Waltz in G♭ Mayor. B-86
- Allegro I. B-88
- Allegro II. B-88
- Clowns. B-89
- Paraphrase on a Theme by A. Arensky. B-90
- Theme and Variations in F♯ minor. B-91
- Theme and Variations II in E minor. B-92
- Waltz in E♭ minor Comodo. B-93
- Waltz in E♭ minor. B-94
- Nocturne in G♭ Mayor. B-95
- Microsadness I in D minor Andromeda. B-96
- Vespers. B-97
- Untitled – Lento in E♭ major. B-98
- Prelude in C minor. B-99
- Painful. B-100
- Waltz in E♭ major. B-101
- Variation on a Theme by Haydn. B-103
- Absence I. B-106
- Absence II. B-107
- Angel’s Milonga. B-111

=== Chamber/instrumental ===
- Belgrano – March Song (piano and voice). B-7
- Duet for Two Oboes. B-15
- Crisol School Song (piano and voice). B-16
- Trio for Two Oboes and English Horn on a Popular Melody. B-17
- Atonal. On a theme of J.A. Bottiroli by N.A. Alessio (string quartet). B-18
- Saint Anthony Maria Gianelli School’s Anthem (song). B-19
- Trio for Two Oboes and English Horn. B-20
- Untitled – Religious Text (piano and voice). B-21
- Waltz in G major for Two Pianos (2 pianos). B-23
- Dark Chamber (song). B-24
- Martial - String Quartet. B-28
- Allegro in G minor (movement) (4 hands piano). B-38
- Untitled (4 hands piano). B-39
- Image (traverse flute quartet). B-81
- Nocturne (traverse flute quartet). B-82
- Adiós Nonino (4 hands piano). B-83
- Angel’s Milonga (4 hands piano). B-84
- Angel’s Milonga (2 pianos). B-85
- Nocturnalia (4 traverse flutes and string orchestra). B-87
- Melody / Memento (flute and piano). B-102
- Vision (traverse flute quartet). B-108
- La ultima curda (tango) (traverse flute quartet). B-109
- Parapeto the Cat / Circle (piano and canto). B110

==== Chamber / instrument groups ====
===== Piano and voice =====
- Belgrano – March Song. B-7
- Crisol School Song. B-16
- Saint Anthony Maria Gianelli School’s Anthem. B-19
- Untitled – Religious Text. B-21
- Dark Chamber. B-24
- Parapeto the Cat / Circle. B-109

===== Duets =====
- Duet for Two Oboes. B-20
- Melody / Memento for flute and piano. B-21

===== Four-hands piano =====
- Allegro in G minor (movement). B-23
- Untitled (4 hands piano). B-24
- Adiós Nonino. B-83
- Angel’s Milonga. B-84

===== Piano duets =====
- Waltz in G major for Two Pianos. B-23
- Angel’s Milonga. B-85

===== Trios =====
- Trio for Two Oboes and English Horn on a Popular Melody. B-16
- Trio for Two Oboes and English Horn. B-20

===== String quartets =====
- Atonal. On a theme of J.A. Bottiroli by N.A. Alessio. B-18
- Martial - String Quartet. B-28

===== Traverse flute quartets =====
- Image. B-81
- Nocturne. B-82
- Vision for 4 traverse flutes. B-108
- La ultima curda (tango). B-109

===== Traverse flute quartet and string orchestra =====
- Nocturnalia. B-87

=== Choral music ===
- Moonlight / Claire de lune – Debussy / Bottiroli (women's vocal sextet). B-1
- The Humahuaqueño / Carnavalito – Zaldivar / Bottiroli (women's vocal sextet). B-4
- Smoke in your Eyes – Kern / Bottiroli (women's vocal sextet). B-5
- Pala – Pala (women's vocal sextet). B-6
- Vidalita (4 mixed voices) B-14
- Adiós Nonino – Piazzola / Bottiroli (4 mixed voices). B-25
- Adiós Nonino – Piazzola / Bottiroli (4 equal voices). B-104
- Choral Work – unfinished. B-105

=== Symphonic music ===
- Small Northerner Suite. I Serenate. B-2
- Small Northerner Suite. II Gato. B-3
- Small Overture on Themes by Mario Tarenghi (with soloist piano). B-8
- Concert Waltzes from “The Gentleman of the Rose.” B-9
- Brief Poem. B-10
- Marcelino pan i vino – Sorozábal / Bottiroli. B-11
- Panis Angelicus – Franck / Bottiroli. B-12
- Carnavalito – Abalos / Bottiroli. B-13
- Poem I. B-40
- Nocturnalia. B-57
- Ulises (Homero). B-73
- Symphony (unfinished). B-111
