= Enrique Saborido =

Uruguayan musician and dancer

Enrique Saborido

Enrique Saborido (1876 or 1877 – 19 September 1941) was an Uruguayan tango pianist, violinist, composer and dance teacher.

== Background and early life ==
He was born in 1876 or 1877 in Montevideo to parents who moved to Buenos Aires when he was four years old, and he eventually adopted Argentine citizenship. His birth date cannot be precisely identified. His Spanish parents noticed his musical predisposition and tried to encourage it by sending him to violin and piano classes. He abandoned his studies, however, and entered the work force, first in a bookshop, until 1892, and later in the office of the Director of the San Martín Theatre for a period of 15 years.

He began composing tango pieces during this interim. His first success was La morocha, which sold 280,000 copies following its 1905 recording, and was one of the first tango songs known outside Argentina. The wife of noted Parisian tenor Jean de Reszke invited Saborido to perform for high society audiences, and Saborido came into demand as a tango dance instructor. According to Saborido, the music of La morocha came from the sailers of the Sarmiento ship who supposedly seeded their music across many points of the globe, a fact that was never verified. La morocha was the nickname of the Uruguayan singer Lola Candales for whom Saborido wrote this song. It is said that Saborido never earned a cent from the success of La morocha, his manager being the sole owner of the song's copyrights. It is also said that this song was so famous, it sometimes replaced the official Argentine National Anthem during official international events.

He returned to Buenos Aires following the outbreak of World War I in 1914, and became a public administration employee. He married Urbana Ruiz and settled the residential Villa Devoto section of Buenos Aires (a daughter, Rosario, became the namesake for his last composition). Saborido made a last public appearance as a performer on the radio, in 1932, and he died at his desk at the War Ministry in Buenos Aires, on September 19, 1941.

== Compositions ==
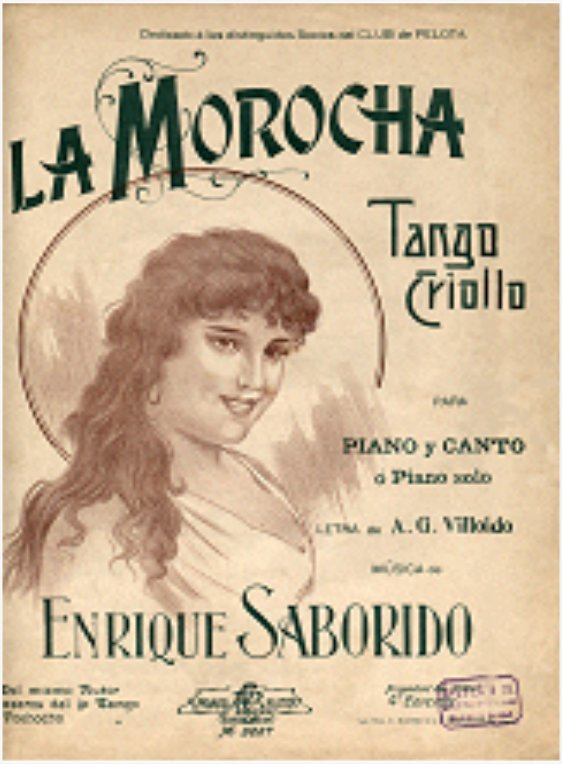
Cover for sheet music with lyrics by Ángel Villoldo

- Dora (waltz)
- Rosario.
- La morocha
- Felicia
- El Pochocho'
- Berlina de novios
- Don Paco
- El señor Leiva
- Mosca muerta
- Coraceros del 9º
- Pegué la vuelta
- Ingratitud
- La hija de la morocha
- Caras y Caretas
- Papas fritas a Federación
- Ortensia
- Qué hacés de noche
- Boteshare
- Prendé la vela
- Martín
- Reclutamiento
- El cantor del callejón (music and lyrics)
- Al otro lado del arroyo
- Queja gaucha
- Náufragos
- Angustia
- Metele Catriel que es polka (polka)
- Baquiano pa elegir
- Caña quemada
- Fierro viejo
- Que sea feliz
- Rezongos postreros
- Caridad (waltz)
- Reliquia santa (waltz)
- Mi soberana (zamba).
