= Silvina Milstein =

Argentine composer and music scholar (born 1956)

Silvina Milstein (born 12 February 1956, in Buenos Aires) is an Argentine composer and scholar of twentieth-century music, living in the United Kingdom and teaching at King's College London. Her music has been described as "turbulent and hesitantly ecstatic", as well as "highly poetic", "rich and dense". In 2018 her piece shan shui was nominated for the prestigious Royal Philharmonic Society Award for Chamber-Scale Composition.

== Background and education ==
Milstein emigrated to Britain after the Argentinian military coup of 1976. Her early musical education had taken place at the Collegium Musicum of Buenos Aires and the Escuela de Bellas Artes of the University of La Plata. At Glasgow University her main composition teachers were Judith Weir and Lyell Cresswell. She was awarded a prize as the most distinguished female graduate in the Faculty of Arts. Later she studied under Alexander Goehr, with whom she has also carried out extensive research into the music of Arnold Schoenberg.

In the late 1980s she held a Research Fellowship at Jesus College followed by a combined research and teaching Fellowship at King's College, Cambridge. She is now a professor of music at King's College London.

In addition to her own compositional work her interests concern the musical and intellectual environment of the Second Viennese School, and of Schoenberg in particular. The main core of her teaching is in composition, twentieth-century music history, and analysis of contemporary music.

== Work as a composer ==
Over the past fifteen to twenty years she has explored musical forms arising from heightened states of awareness, borrowing from a wealth of artistic media and spiritual traditions. These preoccupations are evident in two works written for the London Sinfonietta – tigres azules, in which by her own account Milstein sought to investigate "the compositional potential of treating the 'present moment as an infinite dream'", and surrounded by distance …, an exploration of "the indefinable, yet seemingly precise manner in which musical shapes and configurations arise spontaneously as evocative appearances and illusory continuities, as described in the Lankavatara Sutra."

An important strand in Milstein's music is the use of evocative gestures that draw on the vernacular music of Buenos Aires, a procedure which she evolved in musica ciudadana (1995) and a media luz (2000) as a means of furnishing a composition with a sense of modality. These pieces are like kaleidoscopic collages made out of evocative fragments of characteristic rhythms, turns of phrase and sonorities from Argentinian popular music (tango, milonga, bolero), embodied in textures inspired by the music of the Second Viennese School.

The writer and musicologist John Fallas has pointed out a shift in her work around 1992, from works that carry genre titles – often Schoenbergian ones – to a concern with colour and fantasy.

Her music has been played by some of the leading orchestras, ensembles and performers in Britain and abroad, such as Ensemble Modern (Frankfurt), the London Sinfonietta, Lontano, the BBC Singers, the Endellion String Quartet and Jane Manning. Her compositions have been championed by the conductors Oliver Knussen and Odaline de la Martinez, who have been instrumental in the commissioning of many of them.

== Research interests ==
In her book Arnold Schoenberg: notes, sets, forms, Milstein proposes a hypothetical reconstruction of Schoenberg's conception of compositional process in his twelve-tone music. The core of the book consists of detailed analytical studies, which rely heavily on factors outside the score (such as the sketch material, the composer's theoretical and philosophical writings, his musical development and cultural milieu). In this sense her work extends beyond the boundaries of textual analysis into the field of the history of musical ideas.

Although the main focus of Milstein's work for the last two decades has been in composition, there is much overlap between her analytical work and compositional thinking. For instance, her article on the first movement of Alexander Goehr's Schlussgesang (2003) is an attempt to provide a hypothetical reconstruction of the compositional process, from an embryonic sketch (displaying many technical annotations) to its fully fledged realization. This is the first study to offer a comprehensive technical discussion of Goehr's post-serial harmonic practice in its aesthetic context, and explores Goehr's synthesis of French and Austro-German approaches to tonality and modality and their relation to his understanding of Schoenbergian dodecaphony.

Milstein has recently addressed the role of cross-cultural memory in her work, commenting that "Having written a book on the nature of compositional process in Schoenberg's music in the eighties, I have reflected extensively on the implications of using traditional Western means for achieving musical continuity when dealing with symbolic spaces drawn from non-European traditions."

== Selected compositions ==
[The following information is taken from fuller lists at and.]

- Janus for clarinet and electronic tape (1984, premiered by Lontano)
- Sombras (1985; co-winner of the Ralph Vaughan Williams Trust/SPNM Orchestral Award)
- String Quartet (1989, premiered by the Bingham String Quartet)
- Piano Phantasy after Mozart K. 475 for solo piano (1992, revised in 2017)
- Music of the City - Musica Ciudadana (1993; premiered by BBC Scottish Symphony Orchestra)
- A love song for Psyche and Cupid* for mezzo-soprano, violin, cello and piano (1994; premiered by Jane Manning, Darragh Morgan, Kim Mackrell and Robert Keeley)
- Nova Polska for chamber chorus, solo tenor and chamber orchestra (1995; premiered by the BBC Singers and the London Chamber Symphony)
- Book of Shadows for string quartet and narrator (1998; commissioned by the Endellion String Quartet)
- of lavender light for chamber ensemble (1999; commissioned by Lontano)
- a media luz (2000; premiered by BBC Scottish Symphony Orchestra)
- The Unending Rose for solo violin (2001, commissioned by Darragh Morgan)
- So light upon the wind … (Dante, Inferno, Canto V): aria for twelve instruments (2002, commissioned by Lontano)
- fire dressed in black (2002, commissioned by Vanitas)
- tigres azules (2004; commissioned by London Sinfonietta)
- cristales y susurros – whispering crystals (2005; commissioned by Lontano)
- surrounded by distance ... (2008; second London Sinfonietta commission)
- a thousand golden bells in the breeze for double-manual harpsichord (2009, commissioned by Chau-Yee Lo; separate trio version for harp and 2 double basses, 2012)
- de oro y sombra ... (2011; commissioned by Birmingham Contemporary Music Group, world premiere 25 September 2011)
- ochre, umber and burnt sienna (2012; written for Lontano)
- in a bowl of grey-blue leaves for two pianos (2014)
- ushnarasmou / untimely spring for mixed choir a cappella (2015), a setting of extracts from the Kumārasambhava commissioned by The Choir of King's College London
- fretted sounding-boards for mezzo-soprano and piano (2015), a setting of John Fuller's 'A Short History of the Piano'
- while your sound lingered on in lions and rocks for 2 trumpets and harp (2016), after a poem by Rainer Maria Rilke
- shan shui (mountain – water) for mixed nonet (2017); nominated for the 2018 Royal Philharmonic Society Award for Chamber-Scale Composition
- y la eternidad golpeteando por siempre en relojes de piedra (and eternity forever striking on clocks of stone) for piano and string quartet (2018), after a poem by Osip Mandelstam

== Discography ==
- fire dressed in black: chamber works performed by Lontano cond. Odaline de la Martinez
- In Memoriam (includes Milstein's ushnarasmou / untimely spring), Choir of King's College London cond. Gareth Wilson, Delphian DCD34146
- of gold and shadows Volume 1, Lorelt LNT 141
- of gold and shadows Volume 2, Lorelt LNT 142
