= Hector Ayala =

Argentine musician (1914–1990)

Héctor Ayala (April 11, 1914 – March 12, 1990) was an Argentine guitarist and composer.

Ayala was born in Concordia in the province of Entre Rios. He started his career as a guitarist in Buenos Aires and made his debut in 1936 accompanying tango and folk singers. He later joined the Escuadrones de Guitarra (Guitar Squadrons) which were groups of 12-15 guitarists assembled and directed by Abel Fleury. In the 1950s he was active in radio in Buenos Aires and was a member of a tango quartet directed by Aníbal Troilo.

Hector Ayala composed a number of works for guitar, including pieces inspired by the music of Argentina and other Latin American countries. He also wrote a series of didactic methods for teaching guitar. He died in Buenos Aires.

Perhaps the most famous and celebrated work by Ayala is his Suite Americana.

Hector Ayala was the father of Hector Ayala Jr., who formed the rock duo Vivencia with Eduardo Fazio. The duo were active during the 1970s and mid 1980s.
