= Marcelo Koc =

Argentine composer (1918–2006)

Marcelo Koc (4 June 1918 in Vitebsk, Belarus – 26 October 2006 in Buenos Aires) was an Argentine composer.

== Education and career ==
Koc studied at the Academy of Music in Łódź, Poland and in 1938 went to Buenos Aires where he continued his education with Jacobo Ficher, Guillermo Graetzer and Juan Carlos Paz. His œuvre consists of more than 101 works and includes orchestral and concertante works, chamber music, piano and vocal music.

== Selected works ==
Orchestral

- Invención a 4 voces (Four-Part Invention), Op. 8 (1948)
- Preludio, Intermezzo y Fuga for string orchestra, Op. 13 (1951)
- Divertimento para Orquesta de Vientos (Divertimento for Wind Orchestra), Op 17 (1957)
- Divertimento para Orquesta de Cuerdas (Divertimento for String Orchestra), Op 17b (1957)
- 3 Piezas, Op. 18 (1958)
- Estructuras Líricas, Op. 23 (1966)
- Núcleos, Op. 25 (1970)
- Música para cuerdas (Music for Strings), Op. 34 (1986)
- Tríptico, Op. 45 (1998)
- Sonoridades, Op. 61 (2000)
- Tres Momentos Musicales for string orchestra, Op. 63 (2000)
- Música para Conjunto de Cámara (Music for Chamber Ensemble), Op. 67 (1983)
- Música 2001 for string orchestra, Op. 74 (2001)

Concertante

- Concerto for violin and orchestra, Op. 26c (1974)
- Concerto for viola and orchestra, Op. 35 (1986)
- Concerto for piano and orchestra, Op. 37 (1989)
- Concerto for viola and orchestra, Op. 40 (1989)
- Concerto for cello and string orchestra, Op. 41 (1993)
- Poema Lírico for flute and string orchestra, Op. 47 (1998)
- Concertino for harpsichord and string orchestra, Op. 62 (2000)
- Concertino for piano and string orchestra, Op. 65 (2001)
- Poema Lírico for violin, cello and orchestra, Op. 73 (1997)
- Canto Spinoza for flute and string orchestra, Op. 75 (2001)
- Concerto for violin and string orchestra, Op. 79 (1974)
- Concerto for bass clarinet and orchestra, Op. 80 (1986)

Chamber music

- Preludio for violin and piano, Op. 1 (1945)
- Sonata for oboe and bassoon, Op. 20 (1960)
- Quintet for flute, clarinet, violin, cello and piano, Op. 21 (1963)
- Piano Quintet, Op. 22 (1965)
- Diálogos for violin and piano, Op. 31 (1979); version for viola and piano (1980)
- Música para 11 instrumentos (Music for 11 Instruments), Op. 32 (1982)
- Música para 5 instrumentos (Music for 5 Instruments), Op. 33 (1983)
- Música para 14 instrumentos (Music for 14 Instruments), Op. 36 (1986)
- String Quartet No. 2, Op. 42 (1988)
- Poema Lírico for flute (or violin) and piano, Op. 47b (1998)
- Piano Trio, Op. 53 (2000)
- Transparencias for percussion, Op. 58 (2000)
- Líricas for percussion, Op. 59 (2000)
- Septet, Op. 66 (1983)
- Divertimento for recorders, Op. 68 (1990)
- String Trio, Op. 69 (1988)
- Piano Trio, Op. 70 (1990)
- String Quartet, Op. 71 (1964)
- Trio for flute, violin and piano, Op. 72 (2001)
- Diálogos for clarinet and piano, Op. 78 (1960)

Keyboard

- Música para niños (Music for Children) for piano, Op. 2 (1946)
- 3 Canciones sin palabras (3 Songs without Words) for piano, Op. 3 (1946)
- 2 Invenciones a dos voces (2 Two-Part Inventions) for piano, Op. 4 (1946)
- 2 Invenciones for bandoneón, Op. 5 (1946)
- Preludio y Fuga a 4 voces (Prelude and Fugue in Four Voices) for piano, Op. 6 (1946)
- 10 Variaciones for piano, Op. 9 (1948)
- Preludio, Coral y Fuga for piano, Op. 10 (1950)
- Preludio y Allegro for piano or bandoneón, Op. 11 (1950)
- 3 Preludios (3 Preludes) for piano, Op. 12 (1951)
- Sonata for piano, Op. 15 (1953)
- Sonata for piano, Op. 16 (1955)
- Música para Piano, Op. 19 (1960)
- Variantes y Transparencias for piano, Op. 24 (1967)
- Atmósferas Líricas for piano, Op. 26 (1972)
- Homenaje a Franz Liszt for piano, Op.29 (1979)
- Fantasia sobre Poemas de Borges for piano, Op. 30 (1979)
- Impresiones Sonoras for piano, Op.39 (1986)
- Dos Impromptus dedicados a Schubert for piano, Op. 43 (1988)
- Tres Impromptus dedicados a Chopin for piano, Op. 44 (1999)
- Tríptico for harpsichord, Op. 45b (1998)
- Fantasia sobre Cantos a Spinoza 1 for piano, Op. 49 (2000)
- Homenaje a Borges for harpsichord, Op. 51c (2000)
- Tres Sonoridades for harpsichord, Op. 54 (2000)
- Fantasia sobre Spinoza 2 for piano, Op. 57 (2000)
- Allegro Agitato for harpsichord, Op. 76 (2001)

Vocal

- 3 Canciones de Garcia Lorca for voice and piano, Op. 7 (1946); also for mixed chorus or children's chorus
- 5 Poemas Americanos for voice and piano, Op. 14 (1952)
- Amor y Amar for voice and orchestra, Op. 28 (1979)
- Imágenes Líricas for voice and chamber ensemble, Op. 38 (1989)
- Dos Cantos a Spinoza for voice and piano, Op. 48 (1998); words from Cuaderno Spinoza by José Isaacson
- Si todo se mide for voice and piano, Op. 50 (2000); words from Amor y Amar by José Isaacson
- Dos Poemas de Borges for voice and piano, Op. 51 (2000)
- Arte Poética de Borges for voice and piano, Op. 52 (2000)
- Cerca y Lejos for voice and piano, Op. 55 (2000); words from Amor y Amar by José Isaacson
- Dos Cantos sobre Spinoza for voice and piano, Op. 56 (2000)
- Canto a Borges for 3 soloists and orchestra, Op. 60 (2000)
- Imágenes Líricas 2 for voice and chamber ensemble, Op. 64 (2000)
- Poemas Americanos for voice and orchestra, Op. 77 (1952)

Choral

- 3 Canciones de Garcia Lorca for mixed chorus, Op. 7b, or children's chorus, Op. 7c (1946)
- Canto al Amor for mixed chorus, Op. 46 (1998); words by Juan Ferreyra Basso
- 3 Canciones de Diana Atchebaian for children's chorus
