= Fernando González Casellas =

Argentine composer (1925–1998)

Fernando González Casellas (October 15, 1925 – October 12, 1998) was an Argentine composer of classical music. A student of Jaume Pahissa, his early music was predominantly atonal, although his later compositions explored other musical forms and genres. He was the winner of several composition prizes in his native country and abroad for his vocal and instrumental music which included an opera, Saverio el cruel, and many works with religious or spiritual themes.

Fernando González Casellas was born in Buenos Aires, where he studied composition with the exiled Catalan composer, Jaime Pahissa and classics at the University of Buenos Aires. He died in Buenos Aires at the age of 73 while working on his second opera. González Casellas was married to the Argentine critic and author Ruth Mehl (1932 – 2010). The couple had two children, Fernando and Ximena.

== Works ==
Fernando González Casellas composed 73 works, including:

Vocal – Instrumental

- Vocalise – premiered December 10, 1957, LRA Radio Nacional Argentina
- Vidrieras del silencio (text by Juan Carlos Pellegrini) – premiered December 10, 1957, LRA Radio Nacional Argentina
- Río – premiered December 10, 1957, LRA Radio Nacional Argentina
- Agnus Dei – premiered October 28, 1958, Auditorio Birabén, Asociación de Jóvenes Compositores de la Argentina.
- Canción (text by Horacio E. Ratti) – premiered October 28, 1958, Auditorio Birabén, Asociación de Jóvenes Compositores de la Argentina
- Cantata Nº 1 Días que son condena (text by Osvaldo Rossler) – premiered May 14, 1970, Teatro Municipal, Río de Janeiro
- Balada for violin, contralto, and chamber orchestra (text by Dietrich Bonhoeffer and the Book of Lamentations) – composed 1972
- Tres Sonetos de El Libro Fiel de Leopoldo Lugones (text by Leopoldo Lugones) – premiered July 15, 1977, Teatro Colón, Buenos Aires; awarded First Prize, Fondo Nacional de las Artes, 1975
- Tres cantos para el dolor (text by the Chinese poets, Cai Wenji and Xu Zhimo) – premiered April 8, 1981, Auditorio de Belgrano, Buenos Aires; awarded Second Prize, Secretaría de Cultura de la Nación, 1983.

Instrumental

- Sonata for cello and piano – composed 1961; recorded by LRA Radio Nacional Argentina
- Tres piezas for piano – awarded First Prize by the city of Buenos Aires, 1969
- String Quartet No. 3 – awarded First Prize by the city of Buenos Aires, 1969
- Siete invenciones para orquesta – premiered November 10, 1968, Teatro Colón, Buenos Aires
- Tres Evocaciones (in memory of María Inés, Juan Litwiller, and Fernanda Lidia) – premiered July 4, 1973, Teatro Coliseo, Buenos Aires; awarded First Prize in the Concurso Leonor Matilde H. de von Buch
- Secuencias móviles – premiered December 6, 1976, Instituto Goethe, Buenos Aires; awarded the Premio TRINAC (Tribuna Nacional de Compositores), 1979
- Nocturno for viola and orchestra

Opera

- Saverio el cruel – premiered December 7, 1996, Teatro Colón, Buenos Aires

== Sources ==
- Ficher, Miguel; Schleifer, Martha Furman; Furman, John M. (1996). Latin American Classical Composers: A Biographical Dictionary. Scarecrow Press, p. 148. ISBN 0-8108-3185-6
- Garff, Juan (May 19, 2010). "Murió la decana de la escena infantil". La Nación (in Spanish)
- La Nación (October 14, 1998). "Falleció el compositor González Casellas" (in Spanish)
- Mehl, Ruth (2001). Catálogo de Obras: Fernando González Casellas. Instituto Nacional de Musicología "Carlos Vega". (in Spanish)
