= Máximo Diego Pujol =

Argentine classical guitarist and composer

Máximo Diego Pujol (born 7 December 1957) is an Argentine classical guitarist and composer.

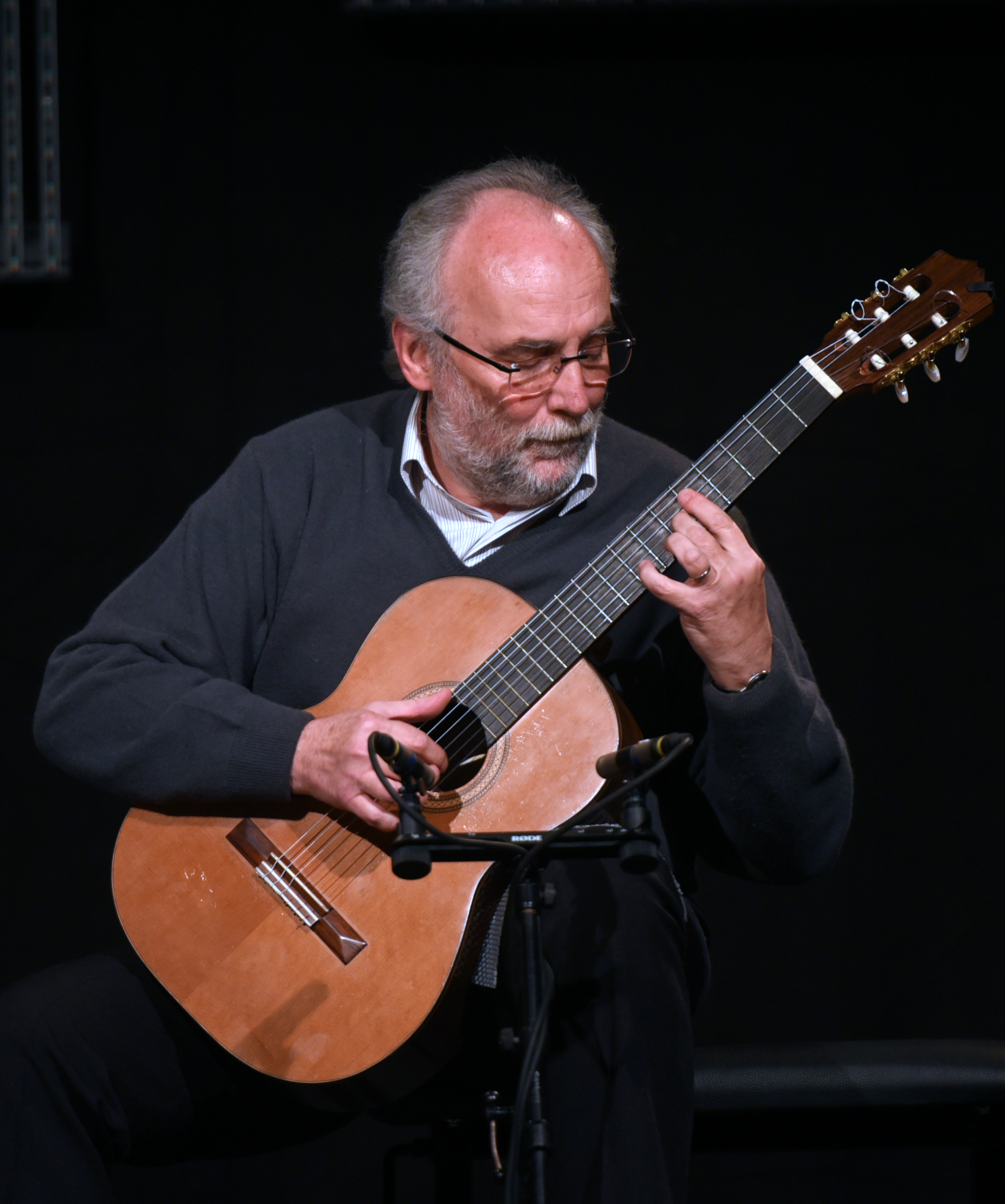
Máximo Diego Pujol playing at Hamburger Gitarrenfestival 2018

== Life and career ==
He was born in Buenos Aires and graduated from the Juan José Castro Provincial Conservatory. Pujol undertook his instrumental studies with Gaspar Navarro, Alfredo Vincente, Gascón and Horacio Ceballos, Abel Carlevaro and Miguel Angel Girollet. He also studied harmony and composition under the guidance of Leónidas Arnedo and participated in master classes and seminars directed by Antonio de Raco, Abel Carlevaro, and Leo Brouwer.

Pujol has been awarded numerous prizes in Argentine and international competitions. In 1989 he was awarded the Argentine Composers' Union prize as 'Best Composer of Classical Music'. His compositions reflect the influence of Ástor Piazzolla and similarly use the tango as a basic style.

== Publications ==
Pujol's music is published exclusively with Éditions Henry Lemoine, Paris.

== Recordings ==
- Máximo Diego Pujol (rec. 2005) (Mandala, MAN 5097)
- Tango, Milonga Y Final (2006) (Aqua Records, AQ 114 - Duo with María Isabel Siewers)
- A mi viejo (2009) (Aqua Records, AQ232)
- Piazzolla en seis cuerdas (2009) (Aqua Records, AQ233)
- Complete Guitar Duos (2009), Giorgio Mirto & Victor Villadangos (Brilliant Classics 9088)
- Historias sin Palabras (2011), Giorgio Mirto, guitar (Brilliant Classics 9209)
