= Zenón Rolón =

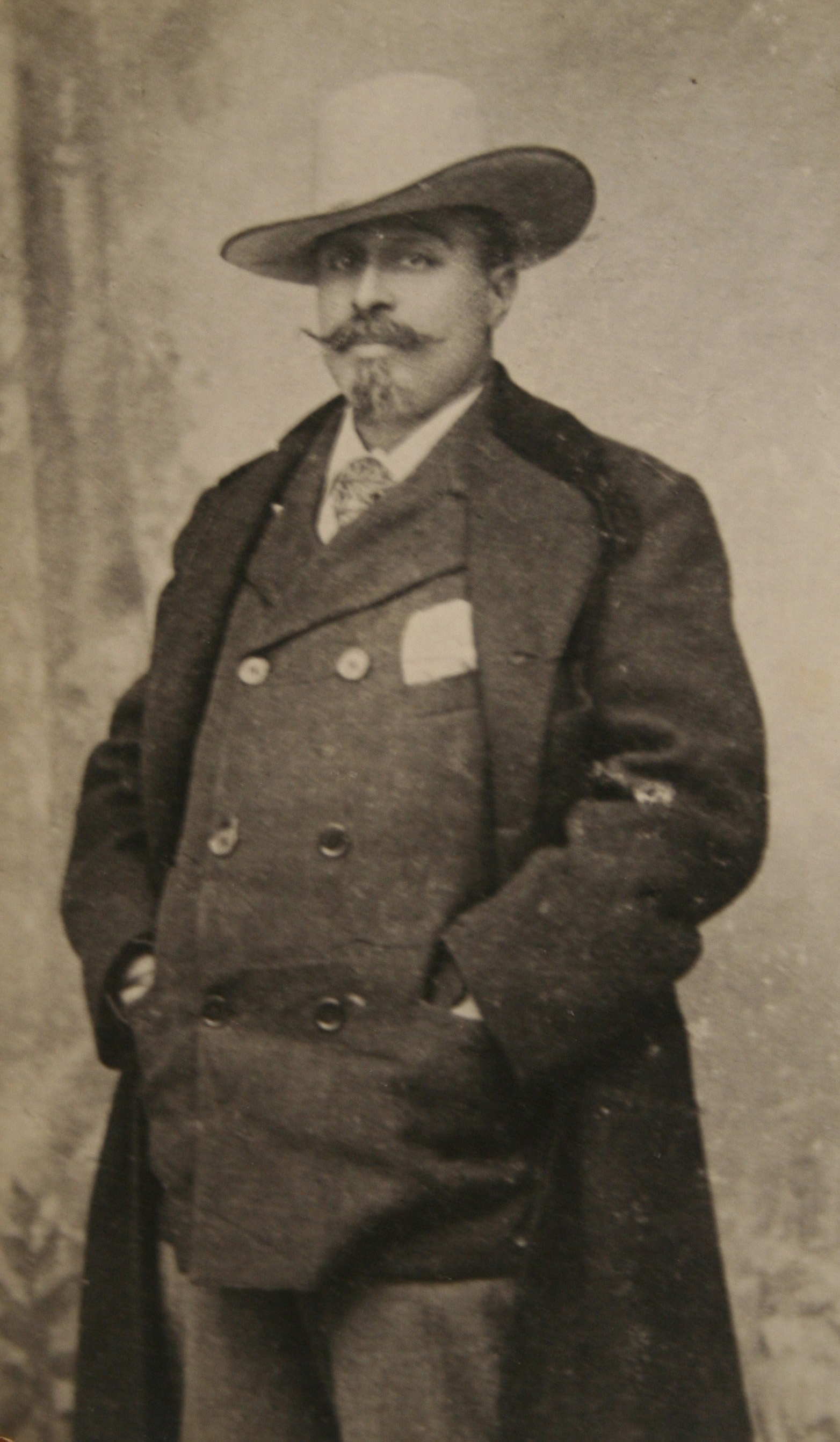
Zenón Rolón

Zenón Rolón (25 June 1856 – 13 May 1902) was an Afro Argentine musician and composer. Born in Buenos Aires, he composed approximately 80 works including operas, operettas, zarzuelas and sacred music. Rolón also founded a music publishing company which published numerous works by contemporary Argentine composers. Many of his manuscripts are now held by the Instituto Nacional de Estudios de Teatro, in Buenos Aires, and by the Museo Histórico de Morón, the city where he died at the age of 45.

== Biography ==
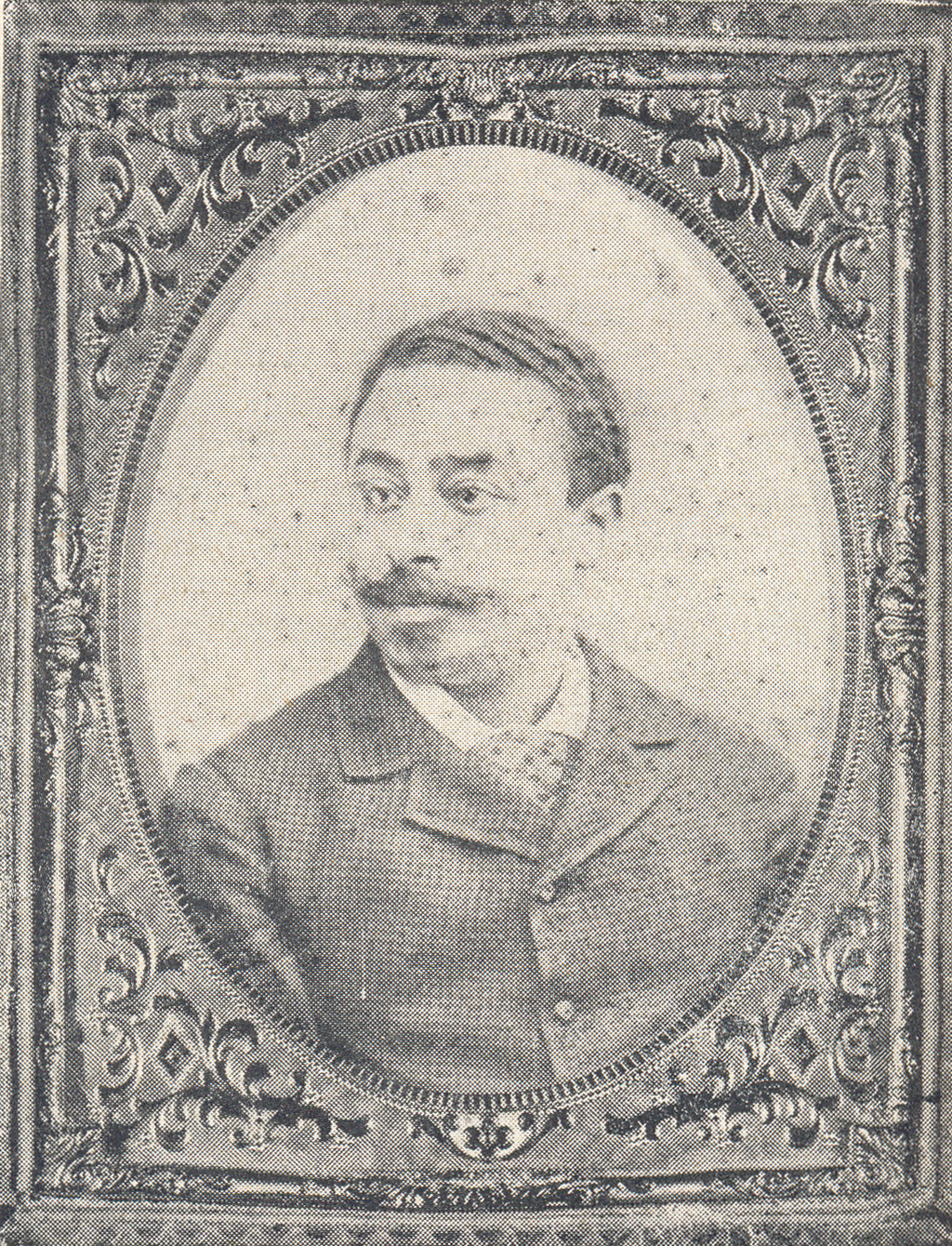
Zenón Rolón

Rolón was born in Buenos Aires to an Afro Argentine family and first studied music in his native city with Alfredo Quiroga, a fellow Afro Argentine and organist of the Iglesia de la Merced (Church of Our Lady of Mercy). In 1873, when he was only 17 years old, he went to Florence for further study and remained there until 1879. In 1877 he wrote Dos palabras a mis hermanos de casta (Two Words to my Caste Brothers), a political pamphlet on the role of Afro Argentines in wider Argentine culture. When it was published in La Juventud, an Afro Argentine newspaper in Buenos Aires, he was severely criticised, but opinion changed in his favour upon his return from Italy. Once back in Buenos Aires, he continued to study music, this time with Basilio Basili, and composed a funeral march in honor of José de San Martín (Argentina's national hero). Rolón himself conducted its premiere performance when San Martín's remains were repatriated to Argentina in 1880.

Rolón married María Quiroga, the sister of his first teacher, and had two children, Dafne and Cloe (Daphnis and Chloe). In the meantime, his musical career began to thrive. In addition to his composing, he also conducted regular concerts at the Jardín Florida and the Hotel La Delicia de Adrogué in Buenos Aires (beginning in 1880 and continuing until 1900). In 1881 he founded a music publishing company, Rolón y Oca, where he published many works by contemporary Argentine composers, and in 1885 he founded a social club for Afro Argentines. Two years later, he was appointed Professor of Music by Concejo Nacional de Educación. Amongst his students were Justin Clérice, Antonio Restano, Prudencio R. DenÍs, and Enrique García Velloso.

Rolón composed about eighty works during his lifetime, including Symphony (1879); the operettas Le Château du Pic Tordu (1885), El castillo hechizado (The Enchanted Castle) (1887), and Strattagemma di Nannetta (Nannetta's Stratagem) (1887); the operas Fides (date unknown) and Solané (1899); the zarzuelas Chin Yonk (1895), El ensayo de una ópera criolla (The Rehearsal of a Creole Opera) (1899), and Una broma improvisada (An Improvised Joke) (1900); and the cantatas, Stella d'Italia (Star of Italy) (1891) and Adiós a la Virgen (Farewell to the Virgin) (1900). He also composed numerous waltzes, polkas, marches, and barcarolles (several of which were published in Florence during his time there). His sacred music included hymns, music for Holy Week (1893), Misa del Carmen (1901 o 1902), and a Kyrie for three voices (1902), which was probably his last composition.

Rolón died in Morón, Buenos Aires on 13 May 1902 shortly before his 46th birthday and was buried in the Cementerio de La Recoleta in Buenos Aires. Many of his manuscripts were later donated by his children to the Museo Histórico de Morón. There are also some of his works at the Instituto Nacional de Estudios de Teatro, in Buenos Aires.

== Sources ==
- Baker, Theodore (1900/2008) "Clérice, Justin" in A Biographical Dictionary of Musicians. Read Books. ISBN 1-4437-2847-0.
- Casares, Emilio, López-Calo, José, et al. (eds.) (1999). "Denis, Prudencio" in Diccionario de la música española e hispanoamericana, Volume 4. Madrid: Sociedad General de Autores y Editores. ISBN 84-8048-303-2 (in Spanish).
- Cirio, Norberto Pablo (2009). Tinta negra en el gris del ayer: los afroporteños a través de sus periódicos entre 1873 y 1882. Buenos Aires: Teseo. ISBN 987-1354-37-1 (in Spanish).
- Cortés, Eladio and Barrea-Marlys, Mirta (2003). "García Velloso, Enrique" in Encyclopedia of Latin American Theater. Westport CT: Greenwood Publishing Group. ISBN 0-313-29041-5.
- Crétel, Bernard (2008) "Justin Clérice", originally published in Opérette n° 119 (in French).
- de Estrada, Marcos (1979). Argentinos de origen africano. Buenos Aires: Universidad de Buenos Aires (in Spanish).
- Gesualdo, Vicente (1961). Historia de la música en la Argentina. Buenos Aires: Beta (in Spanish).
- Petriella, Dionisio and Sosa Miatello, Sara (eds.) (1976). "Restano, Juan Bautista" in Diccionario Biográfico Italo-Argentino. Buenos Aires: Asociación Dante Alighieri de Buenos Aires (in Spanish).

Parts of this article were translated from Zenón Rolón on the Spanish Wikipedia where the following further sources were given:

- Andrews, George Reid (1989). Los afroargentinos de Buenos Aires. Buenos Aires: Ediciones de la Flor (in Spanish). Also available in English as The Afro-Argentines of Buenos Aires, 1800-1900, University of Wisconsin Press, 1980.
- García Acevedo, Mario (2002). "Rolón, Zenón" in Diccionario de la Música Española e Hispanoamericana. Madrid: Sociedad General de Autores y Editores. Volume 9, p. 352 (in Spanish).
