= Eduardo Alonso-Crespo =

Argentine composer

- Born: March 18, 1956; San Miguel de Tucumán, Argentina
- Education: National University of Tucumán; Carnegie Mellon University
- Occupations: Composer, conductor
- Notable work: Putzi, Juana, La Loca, Macbeth(incidental music)
- Awards: Iris Marga Award (1994)
- Website: www.eduardoalonsocrespo.com

Eduardo Alonso-Crespo (also spelled Eduardo Alonso Crespo, without the hyphen) is an Argentine composer of classical music.

== Biography ==
Argentine composer and conductor Eduardo Alonso-Crespo was born in San Miguel de Tucumán on March 18, 1956, and grew up in the neighboring city of Salta, in Northwestern Argentina. He received his early musical training from Elizabeth Ocaña de García in Salta, and his musical college education and degree at the School of Musical Arts of the National University of Tucumán. At this same university, he also received a Civil Engineer degree. He later moved to the United States through a Fulbright Grant and obtained his master's degree in conducting at Carnegie Mellon University. Alonso-Crespo has produced a number of works for the stage; among them a ballet for Medea in 1985, the opera Juana, La Loca (staged in 1991), incidental music for Macbeth (1994 Iris Marga Award) and the opera Putzi (staged in 2004). He is also author of five symphonies, twelve concertos as well as chamber music and choral works.

Alonso-Crespo served as music director of the Tucumán Symphony Orchestra in Argentina and music director of the Carnegie Mellon University Contemporary Ensemble in the US for the period 1989–2000. Past positions as a conductor also include Principal Guest Conductor and Composer in Residence of the Salta Symphony Orchestra (Argentina), music director of the Orquesta Estable de Tucumán, the orchestra of the Tucumán Opera and Ballet Theatre (Argentina), Resident Conductor at Carnegie Mellon University, Associate Conductor of the Carnegie Mellon Philharmonic, Assistant Conductor of the Pittsburgh Civic Orchestra and music director of the Carnegie Mellon Wind Ensemble (U.S.A.).

His music appeared on the New Energy from the Americas album, performed by the Cincinnati Chamber Orchestra and directed by Keith Lockhart. The music for Macbeth performed by Camerata Lazarte under his direction appeared in 1995. His Concerto for bassoon and orchestra featuring Andrea Merenzon and members of the Buenos Aires Philharmonic was recorded by the Radio Clásica label in Argentina. Eleanor Weingartner recorded his Clarinet Concerto with the Camerata de las Américas (José Luis Castillo, conductor) for the Urtext label, and the Trio Cordilleras recorded his Piano Trio op. 30 for the Meridian label. More recent work for compact disc includes the recording of Leonardo Balada's Divertimentos with the Carnegie Mellon Contemporary Ensemble for Albany Records, and a CD for Naxos with the Seville Royal Orchestra.

== List of compositions (in chronological order) ==
=== Works for the stage ===
- Medea, ballet for choir and orchestra (1984)
- Putzi, opera in one act, for vocal soloists and orchestra (1986, rev. en 2004)
- Juana, la loca, opera in two acts, for vocal soloists, choir and orchestra (1990)
- Macbeth, ballet for orchestra (1994)
- Yubarta, opera in one act (1997)

=== Orchestral works ===
- Sinfonietta, for string orchestra (1981)
- Mephisto, waltz from the opera Putzi, for orchestra (1986)
- Overture from the opera Juana, la loca, for orchestra (1989)
- Ballet Music from the opera Juana, la loca, for orchestra (1989)
- Prelude for the opera Yubarta, for orchestra (1992)
- Lady Macbeth, for string orchestra (1996)
- El Valle de los Menhires (The Valley of the Menhirs), version for string orchestra (1997)
- Canto de la Mañana (Morning Chant), for string orchestra (1997)
- Dowland Variations, for orchestra (1999–2000)
- Pachamama (Mother Earth), for female choir or children's choir and string orchestra (sung in Spanish) (2000)
- Symphony no. 1, for orchestra (2002–2003)
- El Valle de los Menhires (The Valley of the Menhirs), version for orchestra (2005)
- Symphony no. 2, for orchestra (2005–2006)
- Symphony no. 3 (Sinfonía Lírica), for soprano and orchestra (2006–2007)
- Symphony no. 4 Hoka-Néni, for orchestra (2007)
- Symphony no. 5, for orchestra (2016)
- Symphony no. 6 (Choral), for mixed choir and orchestra (2019)
- Allegro brioso, for string orchestra with piano obligato (2020)
- Concerto Grosso, for string orchestra with piano obligato (2020)
- Symphony no. 7, for orchestra (2025)

=== Concertante music ===
- Piano Concerto no. 1 (Commentaries on three waltzes by Alberdi), for piano and orchestra (1983)
- Gualba, aria for soprano and orchestra (1989)
- Tibia Piel, duo for soprano, tenor and orchestra (1990)
- Choral Suite from Juana, la loca, for vocal soloists, choir and orchestra (1992)
- Bassoon Concerto, for bassoon and orchestra (1995–1996)
- Chacona en tiempo de tango, for violin and string orchestra (2001)
- Clarinet Concerto, for clarinet and string orchestra (2001–2002)
- Piano Concerto no. 2, for piano and string orchestra (2002)
- Viola Concerto, for viola and string orchestra (2002)
- Violin Concerto no. 1 (Concierto en tiempo de tango), for violin and string orchestra (2004)
- Piano Concerto no. 3, for piano and orchestra (2004–2005)
- Guitar Concerto, for guitar and orchestra (2011)
- Double Concerto for Oboe and Clarinet, for oboe, clarinet and orchestra (2012)
- Double bass Concerto, for double bass and orchestra (2017)
- Violin Concerto no. 2, for violin and orchestra (2017)
- Harp Concerto, for harp and orchestra (2018)
- Date a volar, symphonic lied for soprano and orchestra (2019)
- Flute Concerto, for flute and string orchestra (2019)
- Trumpet Concerto, for piccolo trumpet in A and orchestra (2019)
- Concerto for Horn and Orchestra (2020)
- Double Concerto for Violin, Viola and string orchestra (2022)
- Variaciones Concertantes, for violin and orchestra (2024)

=== Chamber music ===
- String Quartet no. 1 (1982)
- Overture from the opera Juana, la loca, version for chamber ensemble (1989)
- Epic Dances, for wind ensemble (1993)
- Macbeth Suite, for chamber ensemble (1994)
- String Quartet no. 2 El Valle de los Menhires (1996)
- Sextet, for piano, two violins, viola, cello and double bass (2010)
- Date a volar, version for soprano, two violins, viola, cello and double bass (2010)
- Trio, for piano, violin and cello (2013)
- Quintet, for clarinet and string quartet (2013)

=== Choral music ===
- Pachamama (Mother Earth), for female choir or children's choir (sung in Spanish) (1998–1999)
- Waynápaq Taki (Song of the Adolescent), for mixed choir (sung in Quechua) (2001)
- Ara Pana (Fly, butterfly), for mixed choir (sung in Spanish and in Chiriguano-chané dialect) (2003)
