= Alicia Terzian =

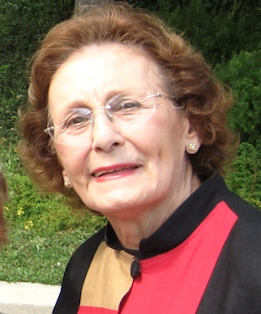
- Alicia Terzian in 2011

Background information
- Born: July 1, 1934 (age 91); Córdoba, Argentina
- Occupations: composer, conductor, musicologist
- Labels: Navona RecordsDisques Dom-Forlane
- Website: Scores

Alicia Terzian (born 1 July 1934) is an Argentine conductor, musicologist and composer of Armenian descent.

== Biography ==
Alicia Terzian was born in Córdoba, Argentina. She studied at the National Conservatory of Buenos Aires under Alberto Ginastera, Gilardo Gilardi, Roberto García Morillo and Floro Ugarte. She received a degree in piano in 1954 and a degree in composition in 1958. In 1962 she continued her studies in electronic music and medieval Armenian church music with Father Leoncio Dayan at the Mekhitarist Monastery of San Lazzaro degli Armeni, Venice.

After completing her studies, Terzian taught music in Argentina at the National Conservatory, the Municipal Conservatory of Buenos Aires, the Universidad Nacional de La Plata and at the Art Institute of the Teatro Colón. She founded the Fundación Encuentros Internacionales de Música Contemporánea (EIMC) festival in 1968 and the Grupo Encuentros in 1979. Terzian has served as a member of the Music Council of UNESCO, is Vice President of the International Women's Council of UNESCO, Vice-President of the Argentine Composers Association, general secretary of the Argentine Society for Musicology, founder of the Latin-American Music Council.

== Honors and awards ==
- First Prize, Municipality of Buenos Aires City (1964)
- Francisco Solano Award (1968)
- Argentine Outstanding Young Musicians Prize (1970)
- National Fund for the Arts Prize (1970)
- First National Prize of Music (1982)
- Gomidas International Prize (1983)
- Academic Palms Medal, Government of France
- Saint Sahak and Saint Mesrop Medals from Pope Vasken I of the Armenian Church (1992)
- Alberto de Castilla Medal of Colombia (1994)
- Mozart Medal, International Music Council (1995)

== Works ==
Selected works include:

- Tres Canciones after Byron 1954
- Libro de Canciones de Lorca, voice and piano

1. Tres retratos, 1954
2. Canciones para niños, 1956

- Tres piezas, op.5, string quartet, 1955

1. Canción del atardecer
2. Pastoral con variaciones
3. Danza rústica

- Concierto for orchestra and violin, 1954
- Movimiento Sinfónico, 1956
- Primera Sinfonía, 1957
- Oración de Jimena aria for soprano and orchestra, 1957
- Escena lírica for soprano, tenor, bass and orchestra, 1957
- Recitativo Dramático del Mensajero for bass and orchestra, 1957
- Tres Madrigales for women's choir a cappella, 1958
- Cantata de la tarde, 1958
- Introducción y cantico de primavera, 1958
- Movimientos contrastantes, 1964
- Hacia la luz, ballet, 1965
- Padre Nuestro y Ave Maria for mixed choir a cappella, 1966
- Movimientos, ballet, 1968
- Correspondencias, 1969
- Proâgon, violin and chamber orchestra, 1969–70
- Carmen Criaturalisfor horn, vibraphone, cymbal and orchestra 1969-72
- Akhtamar, ballet, 1979
- El Dr. Brecht in the Colon Theatre, Music Theatre, 1981
- Y Cuya luz como la profunda oscuridad it for chamber orchestra, 1982
- Bertoldt Brecht at the Salón Dorado, musical theater, 1982–83
- Juana, Reina de Castilla y Aragón, hija de los Reyes Católicos, ballet, 1983
- Off The Edge ... for baritone solo, string orchestra and tam-tam, 1992–93
- Ode to Vahan for piano and tape, 1996
- Les yeux fertiles for mezzo-soprano, chamber orchestra and percussion, 1998
