= Francisco Kröpfl =

Argentine composer (1931–2021)

Francisco Kröpfl (26 February 1931 – 15 December 2021) was an Argentine composer and music theorist.

== Biography ==
Kröpfl was born in Timișoara, Romania into a family of Danube Swabians. He studied with Juan Carlos Paz.

In the decade of the 1950s he was one of the pioneers of the methods of electroacoustic music in Latin America. With the technical collaboration of Fausto Maranca, in 1958 he founded the Estudio de Fonología Musical at the Universidad de Buenos Aires, the first institutional studio of electronic music in the continent. He was the director of the Laboratorio de Música Electrónica del Centro Latinoamericano de Altos Estudios Musicales (CLAEM) of the Instituto Torcuato Di Tella between 1967 and 1971.

In 1977 he received a Guggenheim fellowship for music composition. He received the Konex Award in 2009. Among his many pupils were Susana Anton, Oscar Edelstein and Marta Varela.

He died in Buenos Aires on 15 December 2021, at the age of 90.
