= Gerardo Gandini =

- Born: October 16, 1936; Buenos Aires, Argentina
- Died: March 22, 2013 (aged 76) Buenos Aires, Argentina
- Occupations: Composer, Pianist, music director, professor
- Instrument: Piano
- Years active: 1959–2013
- Website: www.myspace.com/gerardogandini

Gerardo Gandini (Buenos Aires (Argentina), October 16, 1936 – Buenos Aires, March 22, 2013) was a pianist, composer, and music director, who became one of the most relevant figures of Argentine New Music of the second half of the 20th century. He studied composition with Goffredo Petrassi and Alberto Ginastera, and piano with Roberto Caamaño, Pía Sebastiani, and Yvonne Loriod. He was Astor Piazzolla's pianist in the Sexteto Nuevo Tango formed in 1989.

== Biography ==
Gandini was a professor at the Instituto Di Tella (Buenos Aires), Juilliard School (New York), Pontifical Catholic University of Argentina, Gilardo Gilardi Conservatory of Music (La Plata, Argentina), and National University of La Plata. He was also in charge of contemporary music courses at the Fundación San Telmo/Goethe-Institut in Buenos Aires and was in charge of one of the composition workshops at the Fundación Antorchas (Argentina).

Gandini has been the musical director of the Buenos Aires Philharmonic, musical director of the Teatro Colón, and director-founder of the Opera and Ballet Experimentation Center of the same theatre. During 2003, he was composer in residence at Teatro Colón.

He was the pianist in Sexteto Nuevo Tango, Astor Piazzolla's last sextet.

== Awards ==
Gerardo Gandini has received numerous national and international awards:

- First prize in the Freedom of Culture Conference (Rome, 1962)
- Grant from the Italian government (1966)
- Guggenheim Fellowship (1982)
- Molière Award in the music for theatre category (1977)
- City Prize for Composition (Buenos Aires, 1960)
- Golden Osella of the Venice Film Festival (1998), for the soundtrack of the film The Cloud by Fernando Solanas.
- National Music Prize of Argentina (1996), for the opera La ciudad ausente [The Absent City]
- Lifetime Achievement Award from the National Endowment for the Arts (Argentina, 1996)
- Latin Grammy on 2004
- Konex Award – Honorary Mention (2005) for his fundamental contributions to popular Argentine music
- VIII Tomás Luis de Victoria Prize, (March 13, 2008), considered the equivalent to the Miguel de Cervantes Prize for classical music.
- Platinum Konex Award (2009) for Best classical music composer of the decade in Argentina

Gandini was also regularly invited to participate as a juror in international composition competitions.

== Works ==
=== Operas ===
- La pasión de Buster Keaton [The Passion of Buster Keaton] (1978), libretto by Rafael Alberti: one-act chamber opera for baritone with chamber ensemble, jazz quintet, puppets, and soundtrack
- Espejismos II (La muerte y la doncella) [Mirages II (Death and the Maiden)] (1987): chamber opera for two sopranos, two mezzo-sopranos, two ballet dancers, and chamber ensemble
- La casa sin sosiego [The Restless House] (1992), libretto by Griselda Gambaro: chamber opera in six scenes for two sopranos, two mezzo-sopranos, contralto, tenor, six actors, and chamber orchestra
- La ciudad ausente [The Absent City] (1995), libretto by Ricardo Piglia: opera in two acts
- Liederkreis (una ópera sobre Schumann) [Liederkreis (An Opera about Schumann)] (2000), libretto by Alejandro Tantanian

=== Works for orchestra ===
- Variaciones para orquesta (1962), for harp, piano, percussion, timbales, celesta, xylophone, glockenspiel, vibraphone, and strings (16'). Commissioned by ESSO Argentina, City Prize for Composition of Buenos Aires, premiered by the Buffalo Philharmonic Orchestra, directed by Richard Dufallo during the Interamerican Music Festival in Washington (1965)
- Cadencias (1967), for harp, piano, percussion, and strings (6'), premiered by the Academia Santa Cecilia orchestra, directed by Daniele Paris, Academia Nacional de Santa Cecilia, Rome (1967)
- Laberynthus Johannes (1973), for orchestra divided in three groups: clavecin, harp, marimba, piano, xylophone, tenor saxophone, drums, percussion, and strings (15'), premiered by the Buenos Aires Philharmonic orchestra, directed by Antonio Tauriello in the Teatro Colón (1973)
- Soria moria (1974), for string orchestra made up of four solo violins, a string quartet, and a string trio (viola, cello, and contrabass) (8'). Recorded on disc. Published by Melodie Zurich. Premiered by the Camerata Bariloche on their European tour (1974)
- ... E sarà (1976), five pieces for orchestra: Homenaje a Girolamo Frescobaldi, Círculos sobre "L'enharmonique", Planh, Sarabande et Double, and Homenaje a Domenico Scarlatti, for English horn, harp, percussion, solo violin, and strings (20'). Premiered by the National Symphony Orchestra, directed by Antonio Tauriello, Teatro Cervantes (August 1976)
- Eusebius (1984–85), five nocturnes for orchestra divided in four groups, group A: percussion, celesta, harp, strings; group B: strings s/b.; group C: strings; and group D: percussion, piano, and strings (12'). Premiered by the Buenos Aires Philharmonic orchestra, directed by Juan Pablo Izquierdo, Teatro Colón (September 1985)
- Música ficción III (1990), three pieces for chamber orchestra: Neobarroco, Pasos (en la nieve) and Reescritura y continuación de una pieza de Arnold Schoenberg, for voice, percussion, piano, celesta, harmonica, strings ( 12’). Premiered by the Contemporary Music Studio, directed by Gerardo Gandini, Goethe-Institut (September 1990)
- Mozartvariationen (1991) for voice, percussion, piano, and strings (15’), premiered at the Goethe-Institut (1991)
- Estudios para descripción de la luna (1993), for chamber orchestra, percussion, and piano (12'), premiered by the Fundación Omega Seguros Sinfonietta, directed by Gerardo Gandini, Teatro General San Martín (1994)

== Filmography ==
Music

- Allá lejos y hace tiempo [Far Away and Long Ago] (1978) dir. Manuel Antín
