= Juan Carlos Arabian =

Argentine pianist and piano teacher (1936–2010)

Background information
- Born: 29 October 1936; Buenos Aires, Argentina
- Died: 3 September 2010 (aged 73) Buenos Aires, Argentina
- Genre: Classical music
- Occupations: Pianist; piano teacher
- Instrument: Piano

Juan Carlos Arabian (29 October 1936 – 3 September 2010), whose surname is also spelled Arabián, was an Argentine pianist and piano teacher of Armenian descent. A graduate of the National Conservatory of Music in Buenos Aires, he completed his training in Italy, Spain and France, performed as a soloist with the main Argentine orchestras, and taught at the three public conservatories of Buenos Aires. His best-known pupil is the pianist Nelson Goerner. He is regarded as part of the teaching tradition of Vincenzo Scaramuzza, which reached him mainly through his teacher Carmen Scalcione.

== Education ==
Arabian graduated from the National Conservatory of Music "Carlos López Buchardo" in Buenos Aires, where he studied with Nélida Molinari and Eugenio Bures. He later studied with Carmen Scalcione, Sergio Lorenzi, Carlo Zecchi, Maria Canals and Pierre Barbizet.

With scholarships from the Mozarteum Argentino, the French Institute of Barcelona and the Italian government, he continued his studies at the Santa Cecilia institute in Rome, in Taormina and in Barcelona, and then moved to Marseille to study the piano works of Debussy and Ravel.

Scalcione, a direct pupil of Scaramuzza, passed on the Italian teacher's approach to him; according to Sebastián Colombo, Arabian himself "received only a few lessons from Scaramuzza". Nelson Goerner, who studied with both, described the connection as follows:

Arabian was an Argentine of Armenian origin and had received Scaramuzza's teaching less directly than Garrubba, from Carmen Scalcione [...] In any case, his approach to the keyboard was very similar.

== Performing career ==
As a soloist he appeared with the Buenos Aires Philharmonic, the Argentine National Symphony Orchestra, the resident orchestra of Bahía Blanca, the symphony and chamber orchestras of Córdoba, the Municipal Chamber Orchestra of La Plata, and the symphony orchestras of Mar del Plata and General San Martín.

In November 1965 he was one of four Argentine pianists living in Italy – with Edith Murano, Horacio Azcárate and Alberto Neuman – who gave a series of recitals at the Casa Argentina in Rome. In May 1969 the Rome correspondent of La Nación, Ettore Zoccaro, recalled among recent performances at the same venue "the concerts of the soprano Doris Andrews and the pianist Juan Carlos Arabián, received with particular satisfaction".

In Buenos Aires he took part in the Argentine performers series directed by Brígida Frías de López Buchardo at the Golden Hall of the Teatro Nacional Cervantes, where he played on 23 November 1975 and 28 November 1976.

He won prizes at the Pro-Cultura competition in Rosario, the Maria Canals International Music Competition in Barcelona, and the Francesco Paolo Neglia International Competition in Enna, Italy.

== Teaching ==
Arabian taught for many years at the three public conservatories of Buenos Aires – the National Conservatory "Carlos López Buchardo", the Conservatory of Music of the City of Buenos Aires (now "Astor Piazzolla") and the Municipal Conservatory "Manuel de Falla" – as well as privately. He also gave masterclasses at the Beethoven Conservatory in Buenos Aires on the études of Debussy and Rachmaninoff, the scherzos of Chopin, and piano technique.

=== Nelson Goerner ===
His best-known pupil is Nelson Goerner, who studied with him after the death of his first teacher, Jorge Garrubba, and before continuing his training in Europe. Goerner has said that he decided to devote himself to the piano while studying with Arabian:

With Arabian I considerably broadened my repertoire: he would tell me, for example, "Nelson, listen to this", and give me the scores and recordings of Bartók's sonata for two pianos and percussion or Debussy's études [...] I studied with him for four years and we always stayed in touch. It was under his guidance that I decided to devote myself entirely to the piano: we moved to Buenos Aires, and I was determined never to interrupt my career.

In a 2007 interview, Goerner placed Arabian within the Scaramuzza school:

Although the notion of a school seems relative to me, I consider myself something of a grandson of Vincenzo Scaramuzza [...] Scaramuzza and his disciples (such as my teachers Jorge Garrubba, Juan Carlos Arabian and Carmen Scalcione) had an ideal of sound, a characteristic way of approaching the instrument; there is a Scaramuzza sound.

=== Other pupils ===
His other pupils include the pianist Manuel Burgueras, a regular accompanist of Montserrat Caballé, who said that "the person who taught me to play the piano [...] was Juan Carlos Arabián"; the pianists Alejandro Labastía, Tomás Ballicora and Beatriz Feldman; and the pianist and conductor Alfredo Corral. Sebastián Colombo's genealogy of the Scaramuzza school lists some 25 further pupils of Arabian.

== Writings ==
Colombo's book on the Scaramuzza school includes a text by Arabian entitled "Mecanismos de dedo" (Finger mechanisms), illustrated with his own drawings, in which he sets out his approach to key attack, release, rebound and the action of the thumb. The material was provided by the research centre that bears his name.

== Recognition ==
At the awards ceremony of the Argentine Association of Music Critics for the 2001 season, held on 25 April 2002 at the Golden Hall of the Teatro Colón, Arabian received a distinction in the "Performers" category.

== Legacy ==
After his death in 2010, his pupils Beatriz Feldman, Selva Ferrari, Alejandro Labastía and Aldo Ayala founded the Centro de Investigación y Estudios Pianísticos "Juan Carlos Arabián" (Juan Carlos Arabián Centre for Piano Research and Studies) to organise his writings and teaching notes, make them available to students, and organise concerts and seminars. In August 2011 Feldman gave a tribute recital at the Catholic University of the Most Holy Conception in Chile, with works she had studied with him.
