= Alberto Portugheis =

Argentine pianist

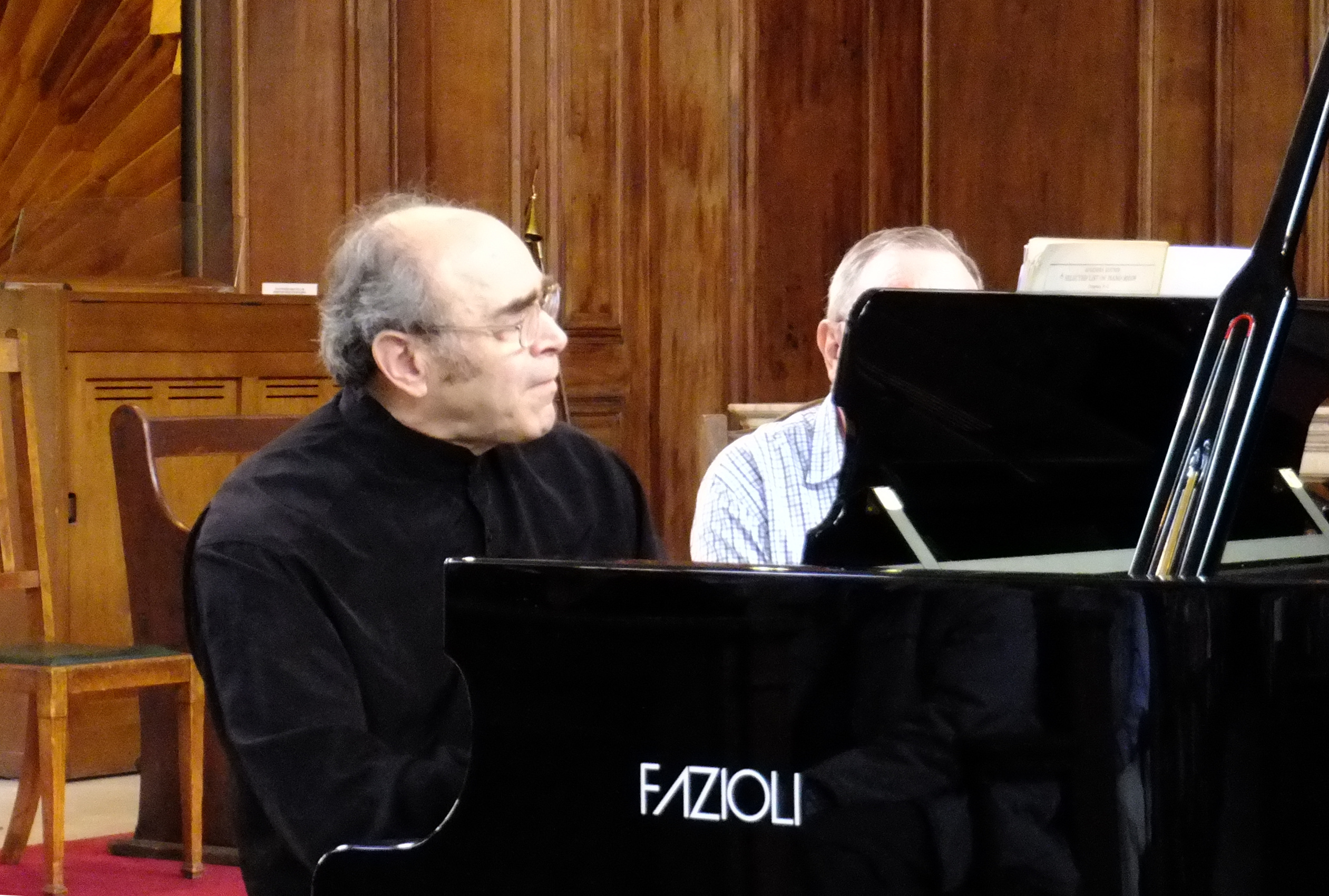
Alberto Portugheis 70th birthday concert

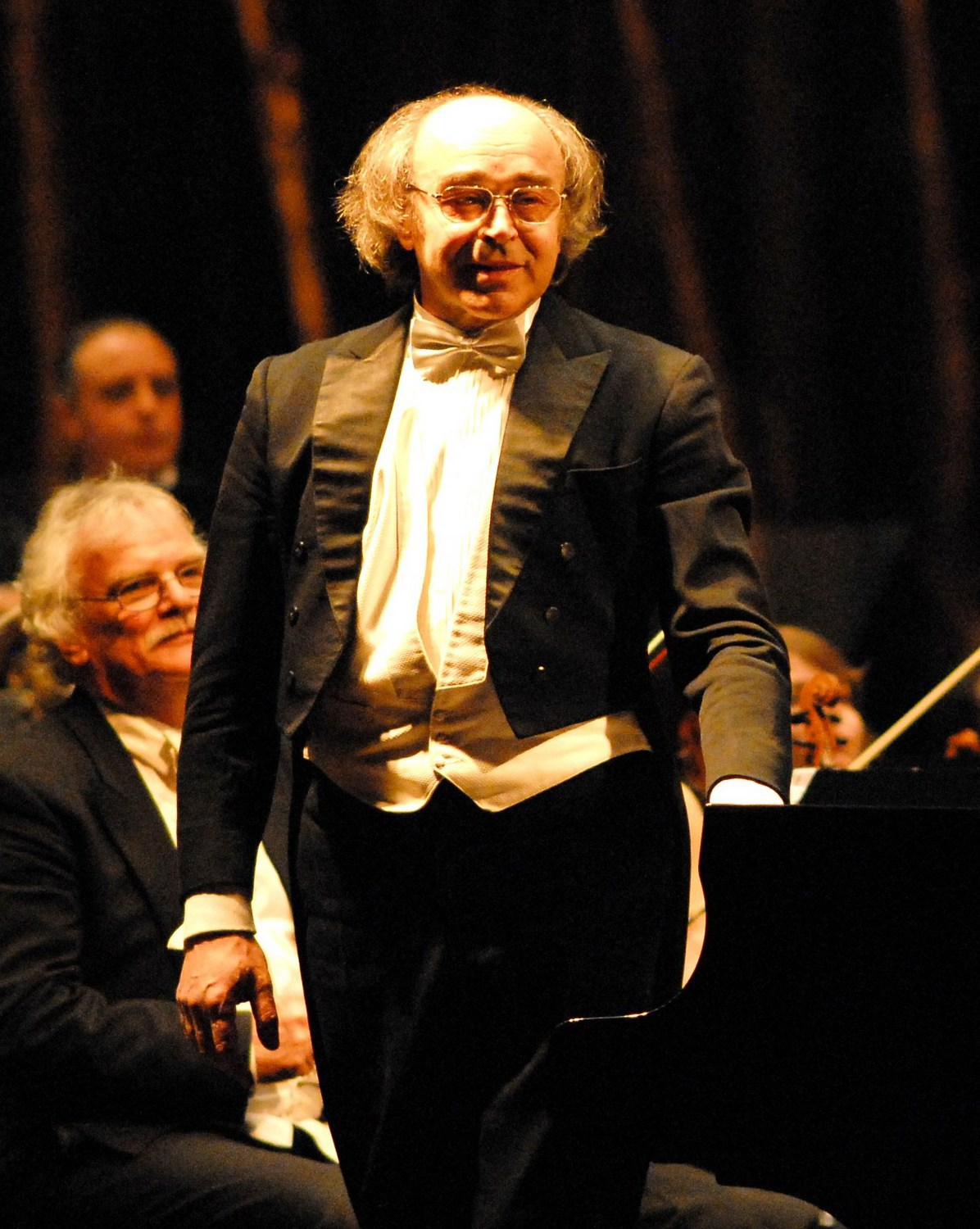
Portugheis after a performance of Beethoven's Third Piano Concerto at the Usuahia International Music Festival, 2008. Behind Portugheis, Götz Bernau, former leader of the Berlin Symphony Orchestra

Alberto Portugheis (born January 1, 1941, in La Plata, Argentina) is an Argentine pianist, born to parents of Russian and Romanian descent. He is an international pianist and teacher, now living in London. After winning first prize at the Geneva Concours de Virtuosité, Portugheis embarked on an international career, visiting almost 50 countries across the world. His recordings include masterpieces from a repertoire ranging from the Baroque to contemporary. He played his 70th birthday concert in London in January 2011, following his birthday on December 31.

== Biography ==
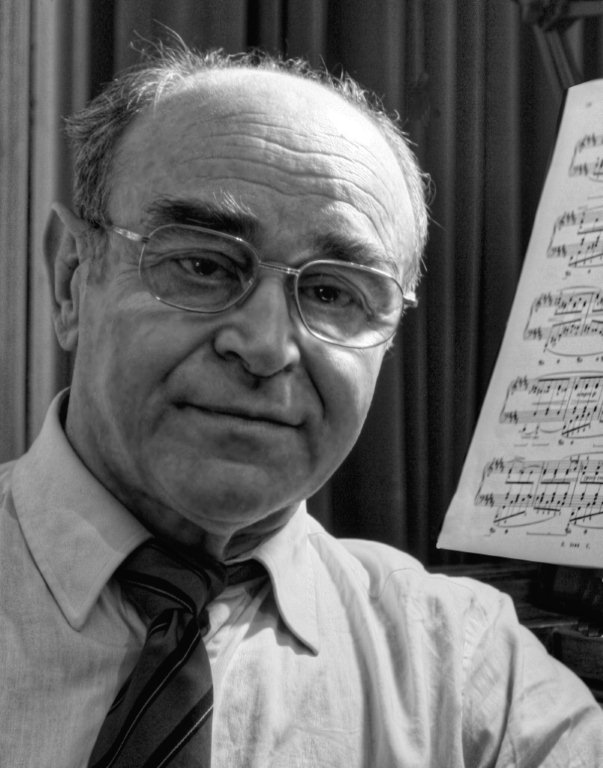
Alberto Portugheis, 2008

Alberto Portugheis is an Argentine pianist and teacher. He was born in La Plata, but now lives in London. He has three children, Susana, Clara, David. His son, David Portugheis, is a composer and photographer.

His mother, Catalina, was born in Argentina of Romanian and Russian descent, from her mother and father, respectively. Her family was originally German, but emigrated from Eastern Europe during World War I. Several of Alberto Portugheis' family members perished in the two World Wars.

His father, Simon Portugheis, was a Romanian (Bessarabian) of Portuguese origin, hence the family name. His side of the family, all living siblings included, had arrived in Argentina from Romania just before World War II. Historically, ancestors on his father's side of the family had lived in Holland and Portugal. Through marriages, Alberto Portugheis has Polish, Lithuanian, Israeli, Brazilian and American relatives. Thus, he grew up in a family that was a mix of various nationalities and origins.

Since his early childhood, Portugheis showed a talent for, and a great interest in music. By the age of three, he was picking out instrumental, vocal and orchestral music on the piano and by six and a half, he had learned to read music. He told Tim Stein in a 1995 interview for Classical Piano of the time his father sold some chairs to a piano teacher and how he asked her if he could try out her piano, saying, 'She became my first teacher, until I was 13, when she thought that she had taught me everything she knew.'

Portugheis then studied for five years with Vincenzo Scaramuzza (the teacher of Martha Argerich and Bruno Leonardo Gelber), before going on to the Geneva Conservatoire. Tim Stein records that Portugheis ended up in Geneva by a "rather circuitous route", explaining that he was first selected by the Argentine University as a representative in Germany. Portugheis was to give concerts and introduce people to Argentinian music. Portugheis told Stein that he didn't want to go back home until having visited the grave of his idol, Dinu Lipatti, in Geneva, and that this journey abroad provided him with that opportunity. While on this visit, Portugheis met Lipatti's widow, Madeleine. He recalled to Stein that she 'was able to pass on a lot of Dinu's ideas, not only musical ideas but ways of practising and his whole approach to music; transmitting the feeling of a composer and, perhaps unique in his time, a reverence for the musical text.'

Portugheis' time at the Conservatoire gave him an opportunity to meet the septuagenarian pianist Youra Guller, a student of Isidor Philipp in Paris who also performed with Pablo Casals and Joseph Szigeti. Portugheis told Stein that although Guller was not a born teacher, she had 'sufficient time and patience' to show him 'the secret of her art'. He described this as 'how to respect the rhythm of a text and how to use the left hand as a strict conductor above all else'. Portugheis said she stressed to him that 'every single note had something to say.'

Enthusiasm for music has led Portugheis to a dedicated study of the piano and his life as an international concert pianist, while the horrors experienced by his family led to his work for peace. He tells in his book, Dear Ahed: the Game of War and a Path to Peace that his family "escaped from Eastern Europe between 1935 and 1940" and that not one day of his childhood passed without hearing of the horrors they experienced. Now, in addition to his career on the concert platform, he works for peace.

=== Study ===
Portugheis first studied in Buenos Aires with Vincenzo Scaramuzza; in Geneva with Madeleine Lipatti, Louis Hiltbrand and Youra Guller; and also in London.

Alberto Portugheis was the only Europe-based pianist to play in the concert "Homage to V Scaramuzza" at the Colon Theatre on August 14, 2002. He features in a film on DVD, The Work of the Master (Scaramuzza's teaching life) directed by Nicolás Borenstein, to be released in 2011.

== Career ==
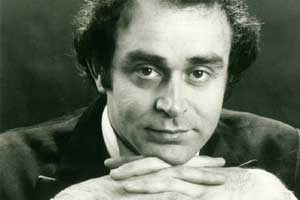
Alberto Portugheis

After winning first prize at the Geneva Concours de Virtuosité in June 1964, Portugheis embarked upon an international career, visiting nearly 50 countries, performing in solo and chamber music concerts as well as being a soloist with many international orchestras, including the Royal Philharmonic, London Symphony, London Mozart Players, English Chamber, Suisse Romande, Lausanne Chamber, Paris and Israel Sinfoniettas, Filarmónica de Buenos Aires, Nacional de Argentina, and Sofia Philharmonic, among others. Portugheis returns regularly to Argentina, where in 2008 he performed Beethoven's Piano Concerto No3. at the Usuahia International Music Festival under the baton of Maestro Jorge Uliarte with Concertmaster Götz Bernau.

Portugheis has also studied the violin and conducting.

=== Master classes ===
Portugheis’ annual masterclasses at Steinway Hall attract a wealth of talent from many countries in the world. Professor Hovhannes Pilikian states in Exceptional Music Concerts under the heading of 'The Maestro and his First Class "Students"' that four of Portugheis' piano "students" presented in a concert –Clare Jones, Katalin Csillagh, Jovanni de Pedro, Blagoy Filipov– are " already technically speaking masters of the keyboard – each a concert pianist of virtuosic proportions". Pilikian comments that "any one of them alone would bring honor to a teacher and their national cultures". Ksenija Ristic, Katalin Csillagh, Gloria Campaner, and Spanish pianist Daniel Bland list Portugheis as one of their teachers.

Pilikian wrote of his approach:

"Cultured and compassionate, the Maestro is a gentle soul, always with a smile, an unassuming human being—Like Jesus washing the desert-worn feet of his disciples, it is rather moving to witness Maestro Portugheis sitting next to his piano students as a page-turner... turning the pages of their musical scores with a profound paternal affection".

== Repertoire and recordings ==
Portugheis' repertoire is very wide, extending from the Baroque—including his own transcriptions—to the music of today: several compositions have been specially written for him.

His recordings include:

- 4 Chopin Ballades
- Alfred Nieman 2nd Sonata
- Ginastera complete piano music and chamber music with piano
- Khachaturian Piano Concerto with the London Symphony Orchestra
- Khachaturian solo works
- Rachmaninov and Shostakovitch cello and piano sonatas; and
- a CD entirely dedicated to the piano music of Rossini.

== Reception ==
In May 1982, a review by Hector Coda, in La Nación, writes:

The spirits of the entire audience were raised with Chopin's Polonaise in A flat Op.53, with moments of real identification with the epic exaltation of the Genius of Poland. Very much applauded, Portugheis offered as an encore a Mazurka by his much remembered teacher, Vincenzo Scaramuzza.

Musical Opinion reviewed his 70th Birthday concert, speaking of "Portugheis' searching and highly characterised performance, rife with mercurial shifts of mood". The reviewer comments that "Portugheis has a strong affinity for the Romantics" while pointing out that he is "best known for his championing of Latin American composers like Ginestera and recent contemporary figures". On July 4, 2010, for instance, Portugheis had demonstrated his "championing of Latin American Music" in an acclaimed concert, where Martha Argerich joined him at the King's Place, London. There an array of world class musicians from Britain, America, Hungary, Romania, Israel and Lebanon paid tribute to Argentina and its music. Most of the programme consisted of works with a strong Argentine flavour.

Dr. David McAughtry reviewed lunchtime concert, at St James's Piccadilly, in London on July 27, 2011, saying, "Portugheis, at 70 is a serious man—a piano virtuoso, teacher, and tireless antiwar campaigner, a Nobel peace prize nominee. He played "Claire de Lune" with huge tenderness as the expression of a lifetime of experience, not all of it good. I found it inexpressibly moving. I could have died then, and felt I understood something, and at the end of the piece my eyes were filled with tears. The pianist sat for a few seconds, shook his head slightly, and got up to receive the applause. I wondered as he stood, if he really had the ability to evoke great emotions in his listeners, while being dispassionate himself. He sat down again, and as he wiped his eyes before starting the next piece, I realized that he had been crying too".

Reviewing a 2000 recital at the Regent Hall, Malcolm Miller wrote of Portugheis' "arresting and resonant tone", describing it as being "somewhat reminiscent of the school of Myra Hess or Dinu Lipatti".

Applauding Portugheis in recital at a December 31, 2002, concert of "Latin American Blend", Miller commented that his playing demonstrated "especial crystalline articulation and beautifully supple phrasing", adding that "in Portugheis's hands, the music overflowed with vitality, its myriad of colours, rhythmic lilt and syncopated energy radiating a Latin American blend of joy and longing."

== Professional associations ==
Alberto Portugheis is co-founder and vice-chairman of the Beethoven Piano Society of Europe, vice-chairman of the International Society for the Study of Tension in Performance, vice-president of the European Piano Teachers' Association, co-founder of the Asociación Latinoamericana de Pianistas y Pedagogos and founder and director of Opus Musica and Opus Musica's sister organisation, Opus Books.

In 1997, Alberto Portugheis co-founded the Iberian & Latin American Music Society (ILAMS) and was its chairman for ten years, though he has now stepped down from the chair and is no longer directly associated with ILAMS. ILAMS was established in London in 1998 with the aim to promote the music of Spain, Portugal and the whole of Latin America. The society's aim is to raise awareness of the cultures involved, in particular, their classical repertoires with a variety of activities every year.

== Humanism ==
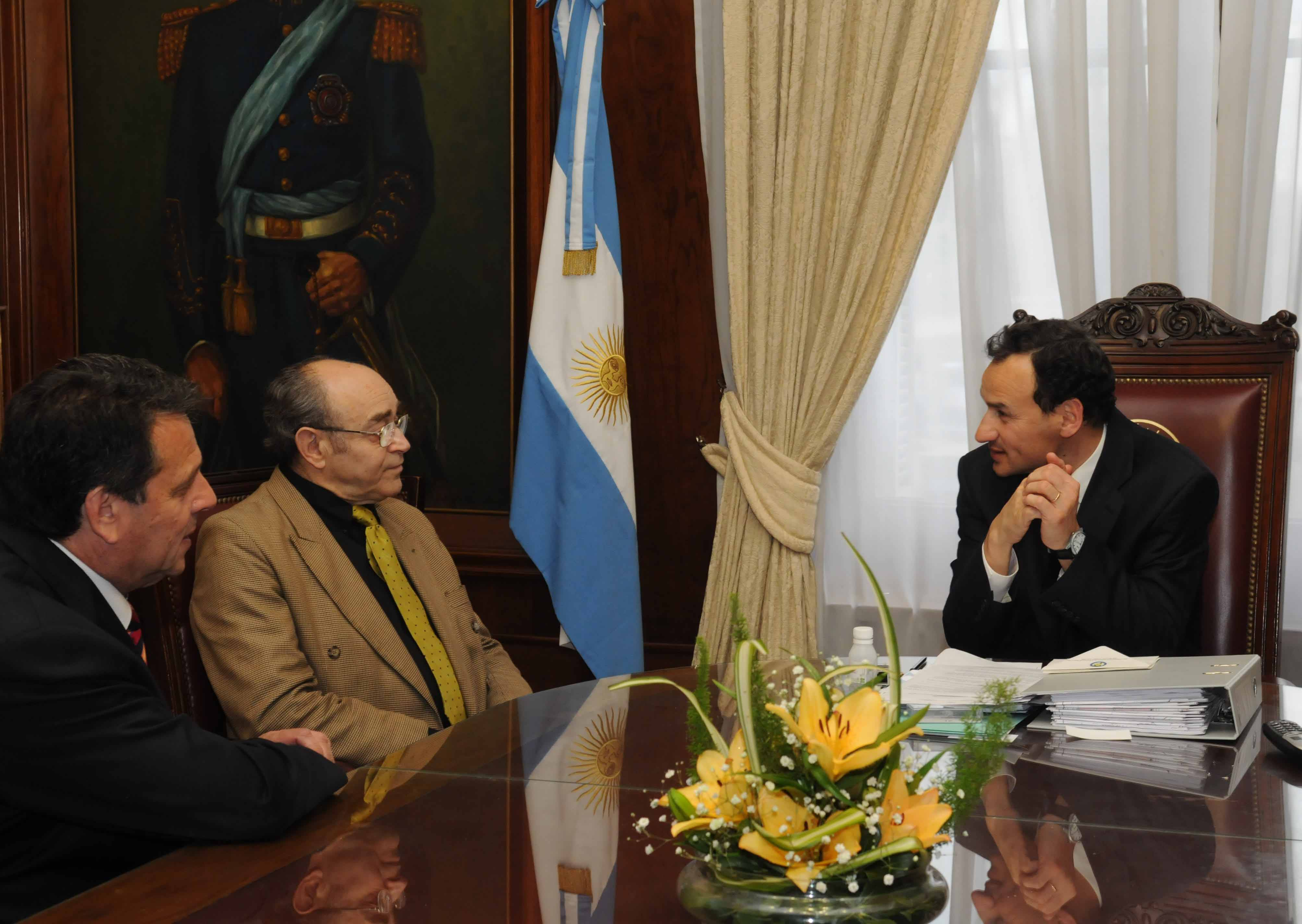
Peace Meeting with Mayor of La Plata

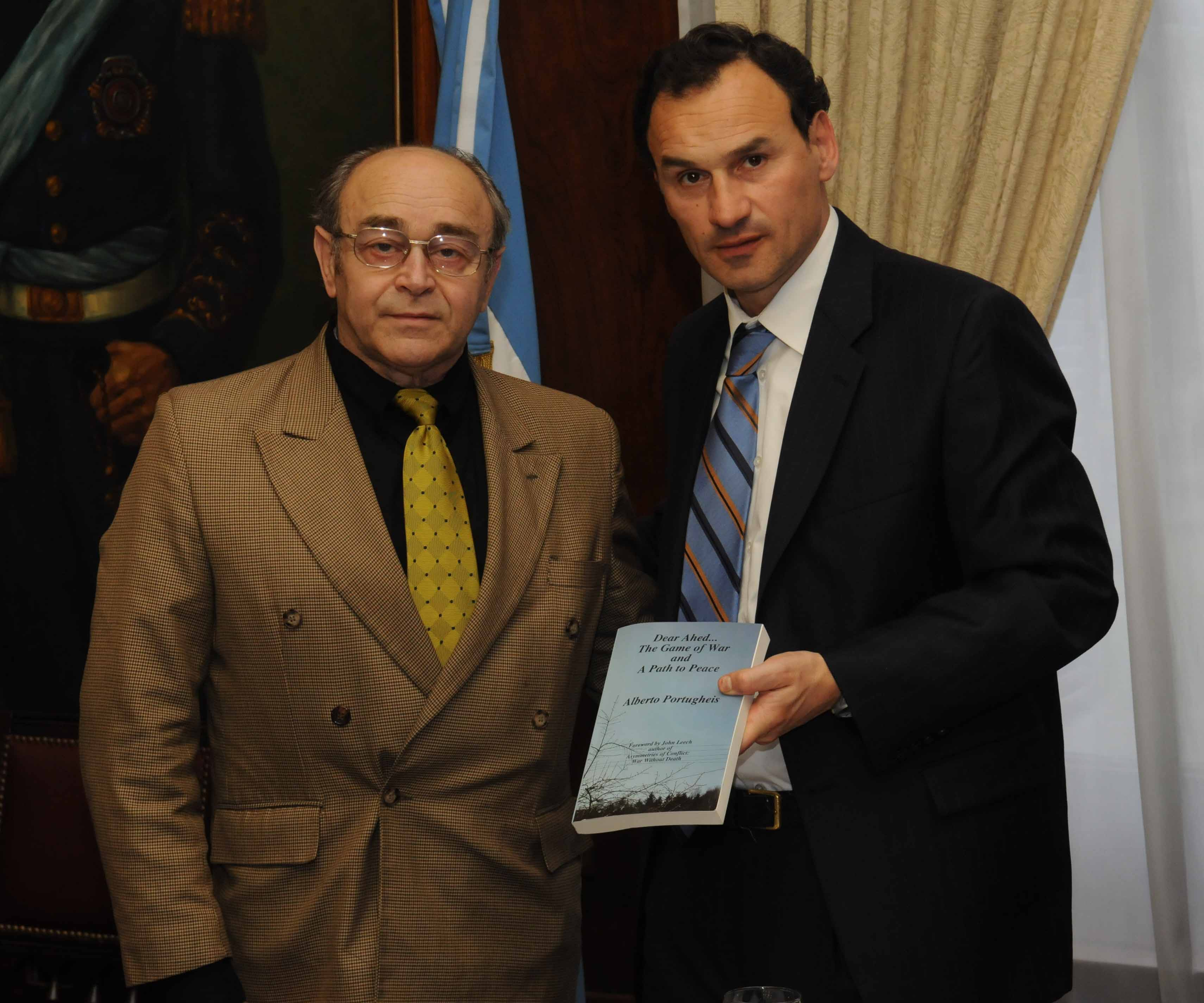
Portugheis presenting his book to Mayor of La Plata

Having heard, since early childhood, stories of the horrors of war, Alberto Portugheis became a committed anti-war campaigner, persistently writing and speaking against militarism. His vision is set out in his book, Dear Ahed: The Game of War and a Path to Peace. The book is dedicated to his late father, Simon Portugheis, who fueled his son's disapproval of war and militarism and inspired his quest for a way to achieve lasting worldwide peace.

Alberto Portugheis has combined his world travels with an active pursuit of peace. At the basis of his vision is tolerance of all people throughout the world. He stresses that every human being has a right to a world free from war, pointing out that this is inscribed in the Universal Declaration of Human Rights, but not observed by any of the countries that signed the Declaration. He argues that there is no solution to conflict while we continue to accept a militarized world, stressing that "weapons for peace do not exist". He wants to see the abolition of weapons, and as a consequence, the universal disbanding of all Armed Forces.

The way forward to peace, he writes, is to understand that those in power have a vested interest in conflict. He demonstrates how experts in "mind control" help politicians organize chaos, violence and war as they create techniques to arouse epidemic fear in the population before offering protection from what they have themselves created. He says, "my interest lies in educating people, in making them think and understand why we do not have a world at Peace. Together we can create a new economic system for the world that will not depend on the weapon business."

John Leech, a leading member of the Federal Trust and author of Asymmetries of Conflict: War Without Death, writes, "The whole book, Dear Ahed: The Game of War and a Path to Peace, is a testament of love. It speaks of the wounds Portugheis has suffered by taking all the world's anguish and misery into his enormously receptive heart. The map of suffering created and 'contrived' by giant adversaries is also the chart of his own calvary among millions of afflicted people. It is not necessary to agree with every word of his homilies to understand and be pierced by his chilling message."

Professor Pilikian notes that Portugheis "tirelessly raises funds for the education of very poor children of the AmaZon Art charity founded by a virtuoso young Brazilian cellist, Diego Carneiro".

== Other passions ==
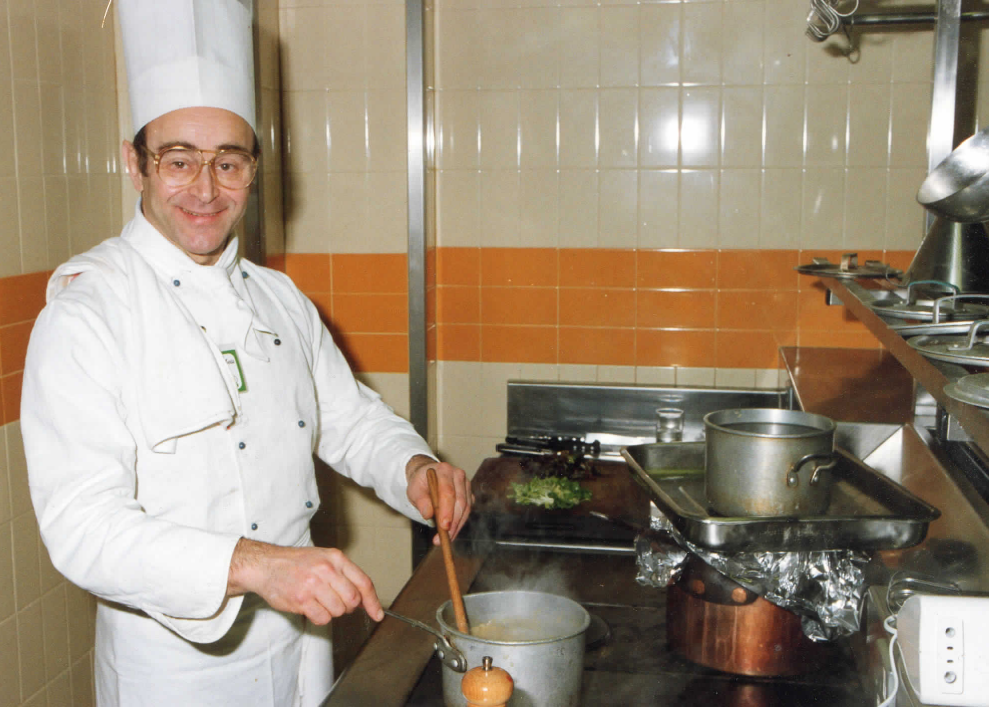
Portugheis shares a passion for food with Rossini

Portugheis shares his passion for food with the great Italian composer Gioacchino Rossini. He told Johnny Black of CD Classics that his world travels as a concert pianist "was the most valuable experience" that he could have had to fuel an interest in good food.

For many years, this multi-faceted man practised his passion for cooking, becoming not only the Head-Chef of various restaurants, but also presenting international gastronomic festivals. Boardroom magazine, records him as a "leading Chef" involved in a two-week festival of charcuterie at the Manor Gate restaurant in London. Document of an article in the local Kensington paper of the day, records that he has become the chef of the Majestic Hotel in Cromwell Road and that he had moved there from the John Howard Hotel in Queensgate, London An interview in CD Classics, 1989, also records this move, saying, that Portugheis was torn between the worlds of music and cooking.

As he traveled the world, Portugheis was enjoying the local food of each country he visited, though he attributes his love of food to his mother, who gave him the opportunity to experience a great variety of food as a child. He also admits that, studying in Geneva, he had to work to keep himself alive. This led him to minor jobs in the restaurants of Geneva, which created a fascination for food, and as his musical career ‘took off’ he started to write articles on gastronomy.

Portugheis became frustrated at working in other people's kitchens. Together with his colleague, friend and compatriot, Martha Argerich, he opened a successful restaurant in London, known as "Rhapsody". He recalls that they decided on this name as he was about to perform Rhapsody in Blue with the Royal Philharmonic Orchestra. The restaurant, which is longer functioning, attracted a clientele of musicians. Portugheis remembers that all his musician friends would come to Rhapsody, especially on the Last Night of the Proms when, he recalls, ‘Andrew Davies came over from the Albert Hall with various friends and agents.’

Portugheis says, "Ultimately cooking and music have a great deal in common. They both provide emotional experiences. Maybe music provides a deeper emotion, but the end result of both is to make people happy". He keeps his interest alive with his recipe writing.

== See also ==
- List of Argentines
- List of peace activists
