= Mariuga Lisboa Antunes =

Brazilian pianist

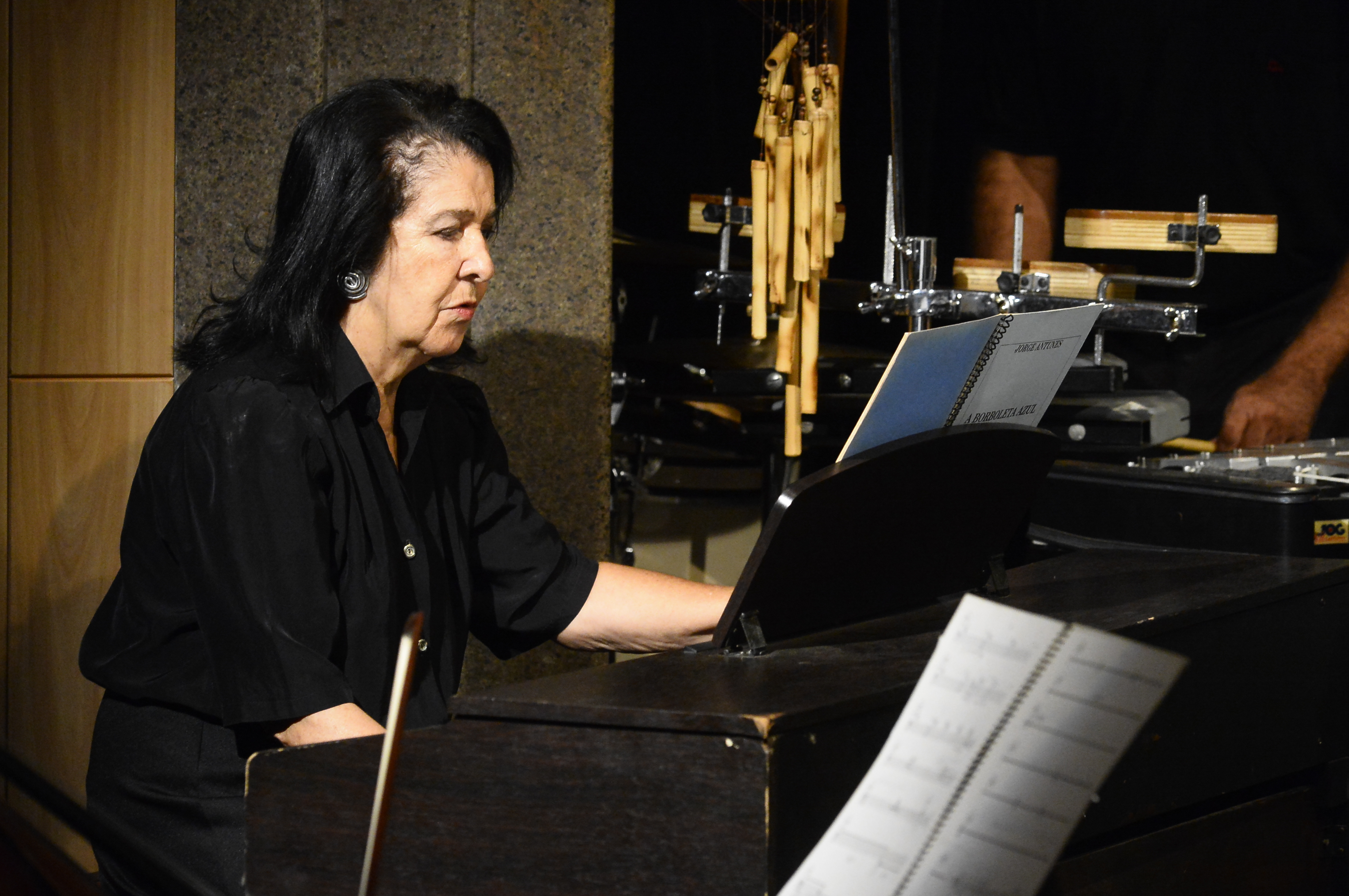
Mariuga Lisboa Antunes

Mariuga Lisboa Antunes (November 10, 1938 – May 31, 2023) was a Brazilian pianist.

Antunes began studying piano in São Luís, moving at the age of 23 to Rio de Janeiro, where she studied in Music education and Piano at the Music School of the Federal University of Rio de Janeiro, at the time named "University of Brazil". She had classes of musical performance with Jacques Klein in the Brazilian Music Conservatoire and, between 1969 and 1970 at Mozarteum Argentino, where she had master classes with Sérgio Lorenzi and Maria Tipo. She had also classes with Elzira Amábile.

Antunes married the Brazilian composer Jorge Antunes in 1969, and had three children: Mauritz, Jorge and Marcus. She also followed her husband in many tours around Brazil and Europe.

Between 1974 and 1978 Antunes served as a repeater pianist at the Music Department of the University of Brasília, with expertise in contemporary music and, in addition, she was pianist at GeMUnB, a group of musical experimentation in the same university.

In 1980 Antunes took part as pianist in the world premiere of the work Elegia Violeta para Monsenhor Romero, by Jorge Antunes, accompanying the Israel Sinfonietta Beer-Sheva.

Antunes died on May 31, 2023, in Brasília, after a cardiac arrest in decorrence of a surgery.
