= Pacific Music Festival =

Classical music festival in Sapporo, Hokkaido

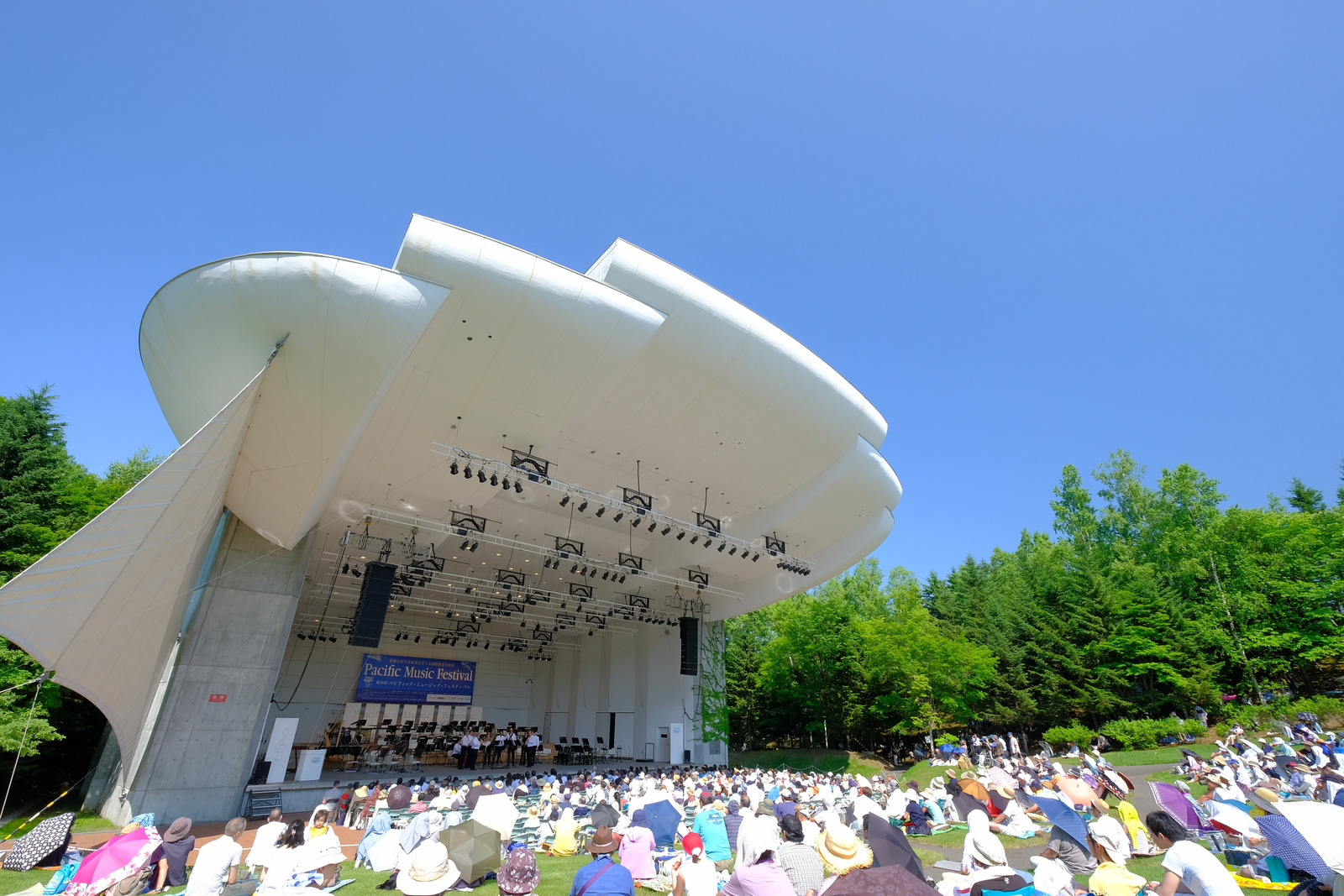
A Pacific Music Festival concert at the Sapporo Art Park Outdoor Stage in 2017

The Pacific Music Festival (PMF) (パシフィック・ミュージック・フェスティバル札幌 (Pashifikku Myūjikku Fesutibaru Sapporo)) is an international classical music festival held annually in Sapporo, Japan. It was founded in 1990 by Leonard Bernstein, along with the London Symphony Orchestra, and 123 young musicians from 18 countries. The original artistic directors were Bernstein and Michael Tilson Thomas.

== History ==
=== 2018 / 29th ===
7 Jul (Sat) - 1 August (Wed) for 26 days

=== 2017 / 28th ===
8 July - 1 August

== Artists ==
=== Conductors ===
==== Artistic Directors ====
- Leonard Bernstein (1990)
- Michael Tilson Thomas (1990–2000)
- Christoph Eschenbach (1991, 93-98)
- Charles Dutoit (2000–02)
- Fabio Luisi (2010–12)
- Valery Gergiev (2015–2019)

==== Principal Conductors ====
- Marin Alsop (1990, 2019)
- Bernard Haitink (2003)
- Valery Gergiev (2004, 06)
- Nello Santi (2005)
- Riccardo Muti (2007)
- Fabio Luisi (2008)
- Jun Märkl (2013, 15, 17)
- John Axelrod (2016, 18)
- Lahav Shani (2022)

==== Guest Conductors ====
- Edo de Waart (2003)
- Fabio Luisi (2004)
- Jun Märkl (2005, 08)
- Yakov Kreizberg (2006)
- Philippe Jordan (2007)
- Andrey Boreyko (2007)
- Tadaaki Otaka (2008)
- Xian Zhang (2009)
- Krzysztof Urbański (2011)
- Eivind Gullberg Jensen (2012)
- Alexander Vedernikov (2013)
- Andris Poga (2015)
- Edwin Outwater (2018)

== Faculty ==
=== Orchestra (2019 season) ===
==== Violin ====
- Rainer Küchl / former concertmaster of the Wiener Phiharmoniker
- Daniel Froschauer / Wiener Philharmoniker
- David Chan / Metropolitan Opera Orchestra
- Stephen Rose / Cleveland Orchestra

==== Viola ====
- Heinrich Koll / former principal of the Wiener Philharmoniker
- Daniel Foster / National Symphony Orchestra

==== Cello ====
- Stefan Gartmayer / Wiener Philharmoniker
- Rafael Figueroa / Metropolitan Opera Orchestra

==== Double Bass ====
- Michael Bladerer / Wiener Philharmoniker
- Alexander Hanna / Chicago Symphony Orchestra

==== Flute ====
- Andreas Blau / former principal of the Berliner Philharmoniker
- Stefán Ragnar Höskuldsson / Chicago Symphony Orchestra

==== Oboe ====
- Andreas Wittmann / Berliner Philharmoniker
- Eugene Izotov / San Francisco Symphony

==== Clarinet ====
- Alexander Bader / Berliner Philharmoniker
- Stephen Williamson / Chicago Symphony Orchestra

==== Bassoon ====
- Stefan Schweigert / Berliner Philharmoniker
- Daniel Matsukawa / Philadelphia Orchestra

==== Horn ====
- Sarah Willis / Berliner Philharmoniker
- William Caballero / Pittsburgh Symphony Orchestra

==== Trumpet ====
- Tamás Velenczei / Berliner Philharmoniker
- Mark J. Inouye / San Francisco Symphony

==== Trombone ====
- Jesper Busk Sørensen / Berliner Philharmoniker
- Denson Paul Pollard / Metropolitan Opera Orchestra

==== Percussion ====
- Cynthia Yeh / Chicago Symphony Orchestra

==== Timpani ====
- David Herbert / Chicago Symphony Orchestra

==== Harp ====
- Ladislav Papp / Wiener Staatsoper
- Mariko Anraku / Metropolitan Opera Orchestra

=== Vocal Academy (2019 season) ===
- Gabriella Tucci

=== Conducting Academy ===
- Leonard Bernstein (1990)
- Fabio Luisi (2010–12)
- Andris Poga (2015)
- John Axelrod (2016)
- Jun Märkl (2017)
