= Nelson Goerner =

Argentine pianist

- Born: 9 May 1969 (age 57); San Pedro, Buenos Aires Province, Argentina
- Genre: Classical music
- Occupation: Pianist
- Instrument: Piano

Nelson Goerner (born 9 May 1969 in San Pedro, Buenos Aires Province) is an Argentine classical pianist.

== Early life and education ==
He gave his first recital at the age of 11. He studied with Jorge Garrubba, Juan Carlos Arabian, and Carmen Scalcione. In 1986, he won First Prize at the Franz Liszt Competition in Buenos Aires, which led to a scholarship to study with Maria Tipo at the Conservatoire de Musique de Genève. That year he made his debut at the Teatro Colón with the Buenos Aires Philharmonic, playing Liszt's Piano Concerto No. 1. In 1990, he won the Geneva International Music Competition. He had been noticed by Martha Argerich, thanks to whom he received a scholarship from the CIMAE Art and Science Foundation and the Mozarteum Argentino; he graduated from Tipo's class with the highest distinction in 1990.

== Career ==
Goerner has performed with major orchestras including the Orchestre de Paris, Los Angeles Philharmonic, Deutsche Kammerphilharmonie, Spanish National Orchestra, Sinfonia Varsovia, Mariinsky Orchestra, and Monte-Carlo Philharmonic Orchestra. He has worked with conductors such as Vladimir Ashkenazy, Philippe Herreweghe, Neeme Järvi, Mark Elder, Paavo Järvi, Vassily Sinaisky, Jonathan Nott, Fabio Luisi and Esa-Pekka Salonen.

He has appeared at festivals including Verbier, Salzburg, La Roque-d'Anthéron, Piano aux Jacobins in Toulouse and Schleswig-Holstein. He appears regularly at the BBC Proms in London and, since 2005, at the Chopin and his Europe festival in Warsaw. In chamber music he has worked with the Takács Quartet, the cellists Gary Hoffman, Mischa Maisky, Natalia Gutman, Steven Isserlis and Gautier Capuçon, and the violinists Janine Jansen and Renaud Capuçon. He often performs music for two pianos and for piano four hands with his wife, the pianist Rusudan Alavidze, and with Martha Argerich.

His recordings include a Chopin album for EMI; Chopin's Piano Concerto in E minor and Fantasy on Polish Airs with the Warsaw Philharmonic Orchestra under Kazimierz Kord for CD Accord; works by Rachmaninoff and Busoni; and Liszt's Transcendental Études. His recordings for the Fryderyk Chopin Institute's series on period instruments – the four Ballades and three Nocturnes, and Chopin's works for piano and orchestra – received the Diapason d'Or, as did his recital recorded at Wigmore Hall in London.

== Awards and other activities ==
He was a member of the jury of the International Chopin Piano Competition in 2015 and 2021, its 17th and 18th editions. In 2014 he was appointed to the Programme Committee of the Fryderyk Chopin Institute. He received a Konex Award Diploma of Merit in 1999 and the Platinum Konex Award in 2009 and 2019. In 2014 the Argentine Association of Music Critics named him the best Argentine instrumentalist of the previous season, and he received Poland's Gloria Artis Medal for Merit to Culture.

== Personal life ==
Goerner is married to the Georgian pianist Rusudan Alavidze and lives in Switzerland.
