= Pedro Ignacio Calderón =

Argentine conductor (1933–2026)

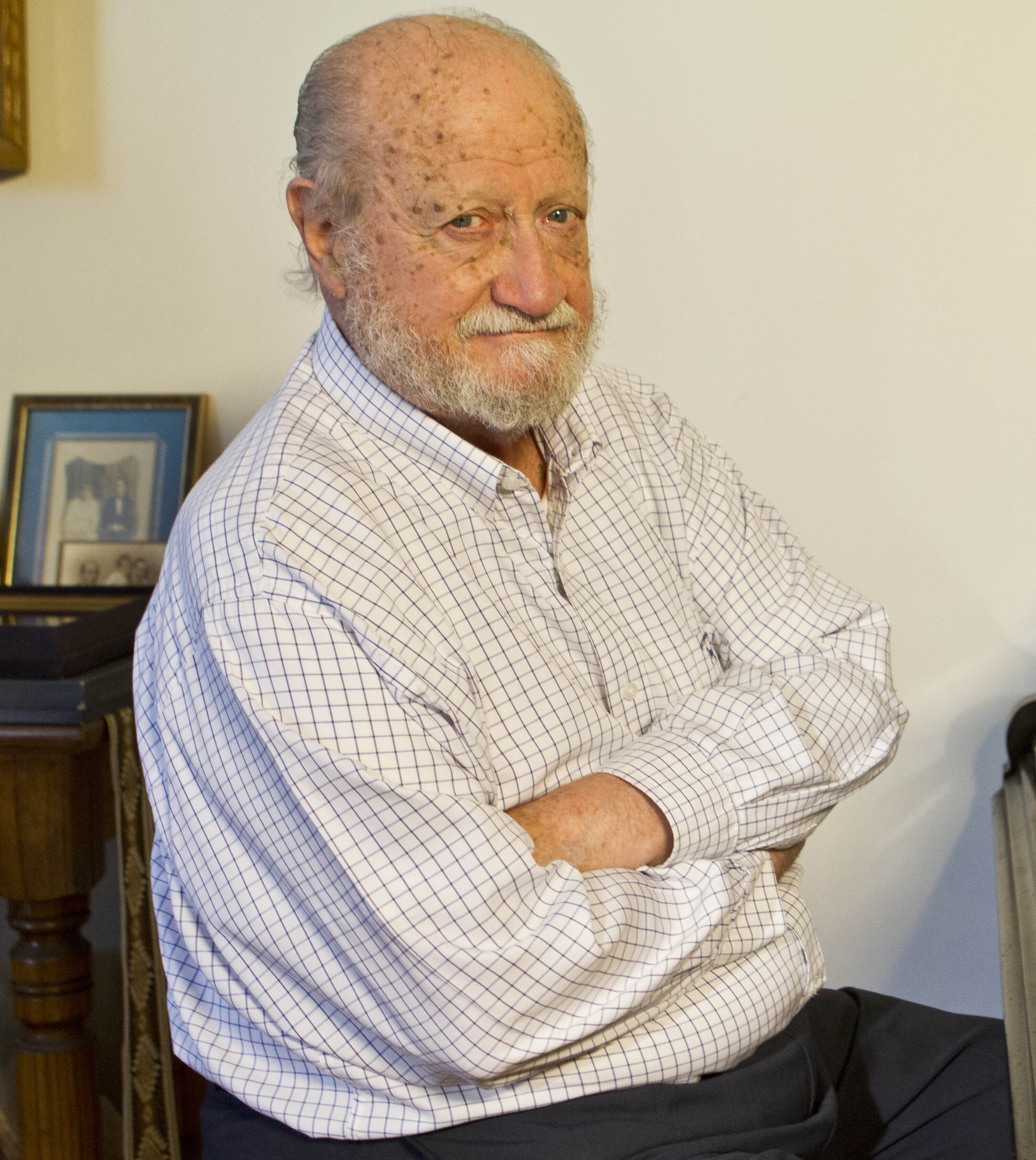
- Calderón in 2015
- Born: 31 December 1933; Paraná, Argentina
- Died: 13 July 2026 (aged 92)
- Education: Conservatorio Nacional Superior de Música
- Occupations: Musician, conductor
- Spouse: Haydee Seibert Francia
- Children: 3

Pedro Ignacio Calderón (31 December 1933 – 13 July 2026) was an Argentine musician and conductor. He was the musical director of the Buenos Aires Philharmonic at the Teatro Colón for twenty-five years and the conductor of the Argentine National Symphony Orchestra for over twenty. Upon his retirement from the National Symphony Orchestra, he was named their conductor emeritus.

== Early life and education ==
Pedro Ignacio Calderón was born in Paraná, Entre Ríos, Argentina, on 31 December 1933. He was enrolled in music lessons by his mother at the age of seven, and, at the age of thirteen, went to Buenos Aires and began studying at the Conservatorio Nacional Superior de Música.

He trained under musicians including Francisco Amicarelli, Luis Gianneo, Alberto Ginastera, Roberto García Morillo, Fernando Previtali, Vincenzo Scaramuzza, and Hermann Scherchen; Ginastera taught him composition, Scaramuzza taught him piano, and he took lessons in conducting from Scherchen. Calderón also learnt attending concerts in the capital.

== Career ==
Calderón conducted his first concert, with the Entre Ríos Symphony Orchestra, when he was fifteen. He conducted another concert when he was sixteen in San Juan and, when he was twenty, began conducting in Buenos Aires at the Orquesta Sinfónica de Radio Nacional. A few years later, in 1955, he was hired at the Teatro Colón opera house and, when he was around 25, became the principal conductor of the National University of Tucumán's Symphony Orchestra. In 1960, he was given a grant by the Fondo Nacional de las Artes to study for a year at the Conservatorio Santa Cecilia in Rome, Italy. After returning to Argentina, he took lessons in conducting from Victor Tevah and began working in Tucumán for a few months every year.

In 1963, he left the country again after winning, alongside conductors Zdeněk Košler and Claudio Abbado, the Dimitri Mitropoulos International Conducting Competition; as a result, Calderón worked as an assistant conductor to American Leonard Bernstein at the New York Philharmonic Orchestra for a year. Afterwards, again back in Argentina, he founded the Ensemble Musical de Buenos Aires in 1966. The group played both popular and chamber music and performed on television. They played alongside the comedy group Les Luthiers, and versions of La Biblia by Vox Dei and Tangazo Variaciones sobre Buenos Aires by Astor Piazzolla.

Throughout this time, Calderón continued to work at the Teatro Colón in Buenos Aires, working for over 25 years (from 1966 onwards) as a conductor at their Buenos Aires Philharmonic orchestra and serving, at various points, as the theatre's artistic and general director. He in 1992, became their musical director, a role he held until 1993. In 1994, he moved to the Argentine National Symphony Orchestra to work as their conductor; during his tenure, the orchestra toured the country, performing both classical pieces and pieces by modern Argentine composers. They popularized the practice of giving free performances in the country.

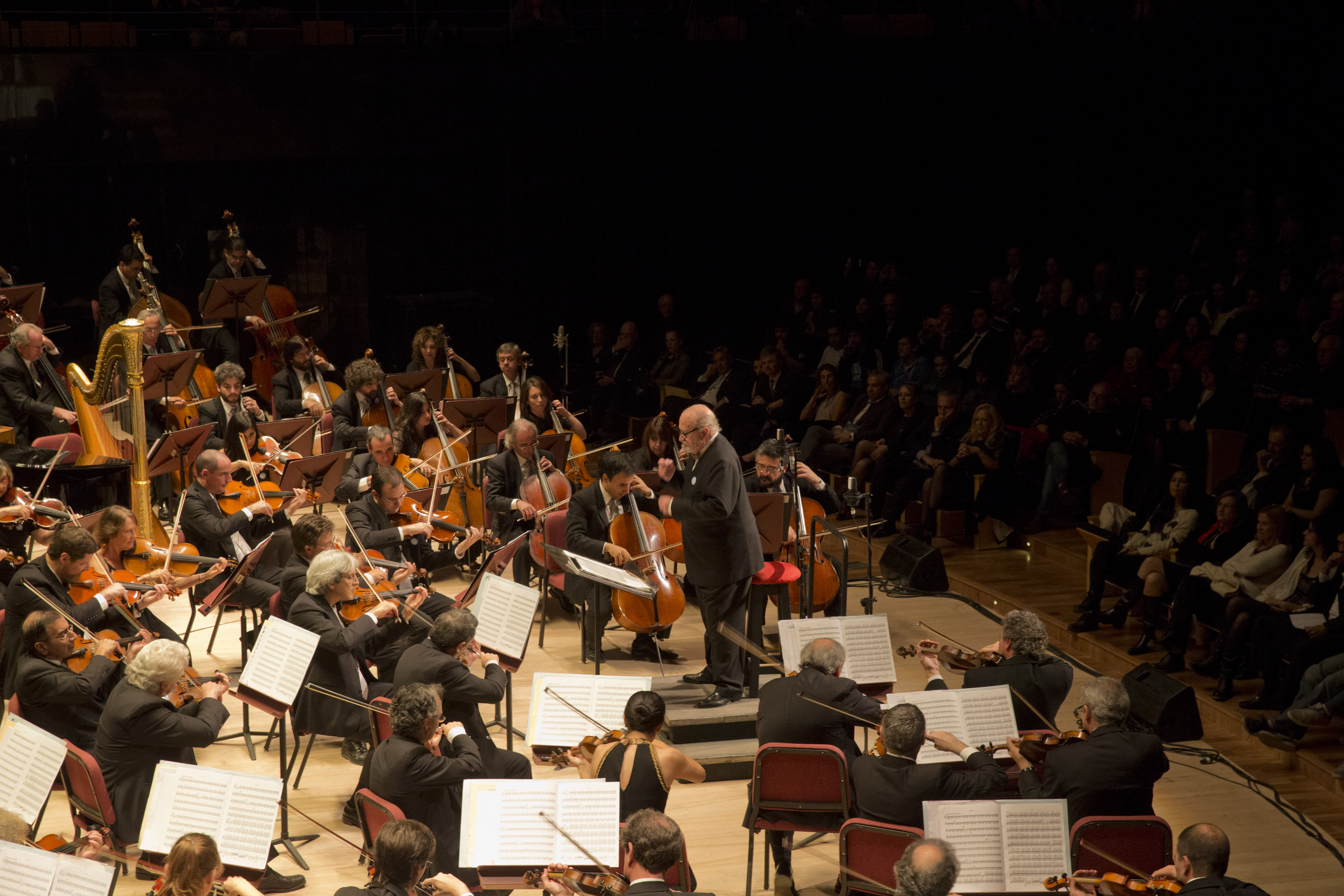
Calderón conducting the Argentine National Symphony Orchestra in 2015

Calderón retired from the National Symphony Orchestra in 2015, after over twenty years. His last performance was played at the Blue Whale Auditorium at the Centro Cultural Kirchner. The orchestra performed Bach's St John Passion, with accompaniment from the National Youth and National Children's Choirs. The National Symphony Orchestra also named him their director emeritus.

As a guest conductor, Calderón performed at many orchestras in Argentina, Latin America, the United States, Europe, and Japan, including at the Leningrad Philharmonic Orchestra, the Orchestre national du Capitole de Toulouse, the Orchestre national de Lille, the Pasdeloup Orchestra, the RTVE Symphony Orchestra, the Spanish National Orchestra, the Tchaikovsky Symphony Orchestra, and the Tonkünstler Orchestra. In 2001 and 2005, he performed with at the Lancaster Symphony Orchestra.

=== Soundtracks ===
Soundtracks or films Calderón worked on include:

- El Santo de la Espada (1970)
- La vuelta de Martín Fierro (1974)
- De cara al cielo (1979)
- Buenos Aires, la tercera fundación (1980)

== Personal life and death ==
Calderón was married to violinist Haydee Seibert Francia, who played for the Buenos Aires Philharmonic; the couple had three children.

Calderón died on 13 July 2026, at the age of 92. His death was announced by the Argentine Secretary of Culture, Leonardo Cifelli. The following August, the Entre Ríos Symphony Orchestra held a concert with a symphony dedicated to Calderón.

== Awards ==
In 1989, Calderón won a Konex Merit Diploma from the Konex Foundation Awards; he won another diploma and a Platinum award in 1999. In 2009, he served on their jury. Calderón was also declared an Illustrious Citizen of Buenos Aires on 12 December 2002.
