= Cristina Filoso =

Argentine musician

Cristina Filoso is an Argentine concert pianist.

== Music career and works ==
Cristina Filoso was born in Buenos Aires, Argentina. She studied with Vincenzo Scaramuzza and then continued her studies with Earl Wild and Nikita Magaloff. In 1992, she was awarded the first prize at the Alberto Williams Competition.

She has performed many piano recitals in Argentina, Spain, Italy, England, Mexico, Venezuela, Chile, South Africa, and other African countries. She has played as a soloist with the “Arcos of Buenos Aires“ Orchestra, the Symphonic Orchestra of Rosario (Santa Fe), the Symphonic Orchestra of San Juan, the Orchestra of the Teatro Argentino de La Plata, the Buenos Aires Philharmonic at the Colón Theatre several times, and the Symphonic of Mexico City.

As a chamber music performer, she has played with cellists Christine Walevska (U.S.A.), Eduardo Vassallo (Argentina), and Franco Maggio (Italy), and violinists Mark Peskanov (Russia), Peter Thomas (England), Vadim Brodski (Poland), Alberto Lysy (Argentina), and Fernando Hasaj (Uruguay). Together with violoncellist Eduardo Vassallo, she premiered Astor Piazzolla‘s "Le Grand Tango" in the presence of the composer himself. They recorded a CD with this piece and other Latin-American compositions.

She and Eduardo Vassallo have recently recorded another CD of Astor Piazzolla's tangos in England. There, they also played all of Beethoven’s sonatas for piano and cello. In England, she always plays with the Birmingham Ensemble.

She plays in the Trío Clásico de Buenos Aires, together with Oleg Pishénin (violin) and Carlos Nozzi (cello).
