= Argentine National Symphony Orchestra =

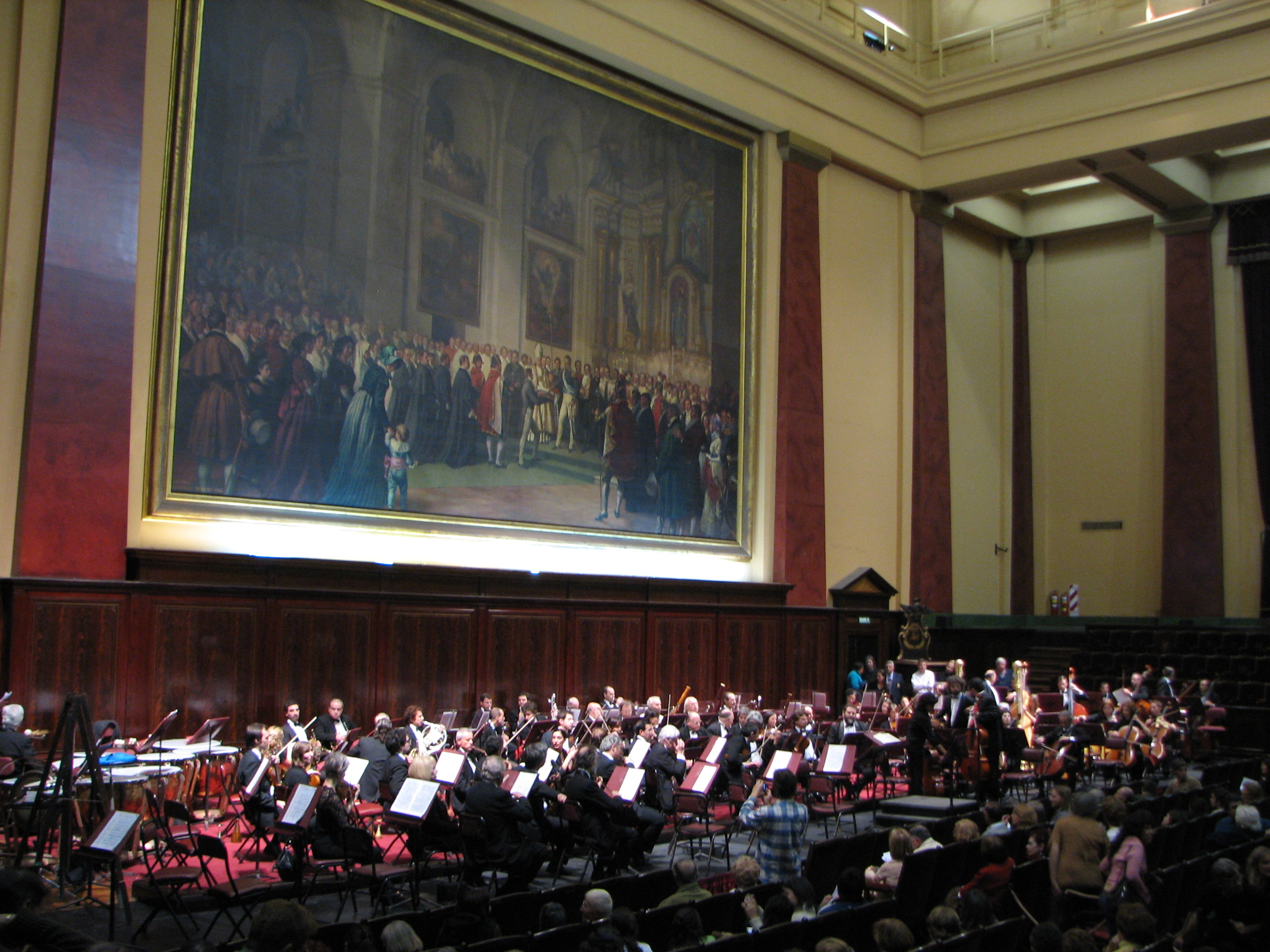
The Argentine National Symphony Orchestra at the University of Buenos Aires Law School

The Argentine National Symphony Orchestra (Spanish: Orquesta Sinfónica Nacional) is the state symphony orchestra of Argentina, based in Buenos Aires.

== History ==
Established as the State Symphony Orchestra, on November 20, 1948, via a bill (Law 35879) signed by President Juan Perón, the orchestra was created that it could "constitute the pitch of universal resonance that our music needs, while providing the most effective means of popular education in the arts."

Philharmonic associations had, by then, a long tradition in Argentina, and could be traced in Buenos Aires to the 1822 formation of the Academy of Music and of the Philharmonic Association, the following year. These orchestras struggled under the instability prevailing during the years of the Argentine Confederation, however, and their performances were only sporadic. The German Argentine community helped advance the medium with the founding a number of choral societies between 1852 and 1863, notably Concordia, Germania and the Deutsche Sing-Akademie, and these were complemented by the Buenos Aires Orchestral Society (1876) and the Musical Mutual Society (1894). The latter ultimately formed the first orchestral guild in Argentina, the Orchestra Professionals' Association (APO), in 1919.

The APO Orchestra was constituted as such in 1922, and prospered with its collaboration with the local Wagner Association, reaching its zenith under the baton of Swiss conductor Ernest Ansermet. The Great Depression later limited its activity sharply, and the orchestra was nearly closed in 1935, highlighting the need for state support. Accordingly, the Buenos Aires Symphony (today the Buenos Aires Philharmonic) was founded in 1947, and in 1948, the State Symphony Orchestra.

The symphony was created under the aegis of the Secretariat of Culture, and with 92 musicians. Directed initially by Roberto Kinsky, its first concert took place at the renowned Colón Opera House on November 30, 1949; on that evening's program was Ludwig van Beethoven's Consecration of the House Overture, Johannes Brahms's Symphony No.2, and Igor Stravinsky's Scherzo Fantastico. Its repertoire was soon expanded to include works by classical Argentine composers, as well, notably Carlos Guastavino, Carlos López Buchardo and Alberto Williams. Apart from its performances at the Colón Opera House, the symphony would appear often in the Cervantes and Gran Rex theatres, and it increasingly featured 20th-century classical music, notably Ottorino Respighi's Sinfonia Drammatica and Sergei Prokofiev's Alexander Nevsky; among the well-known guest musicians during the symphony's early years was violinist Henryk Szeryng.

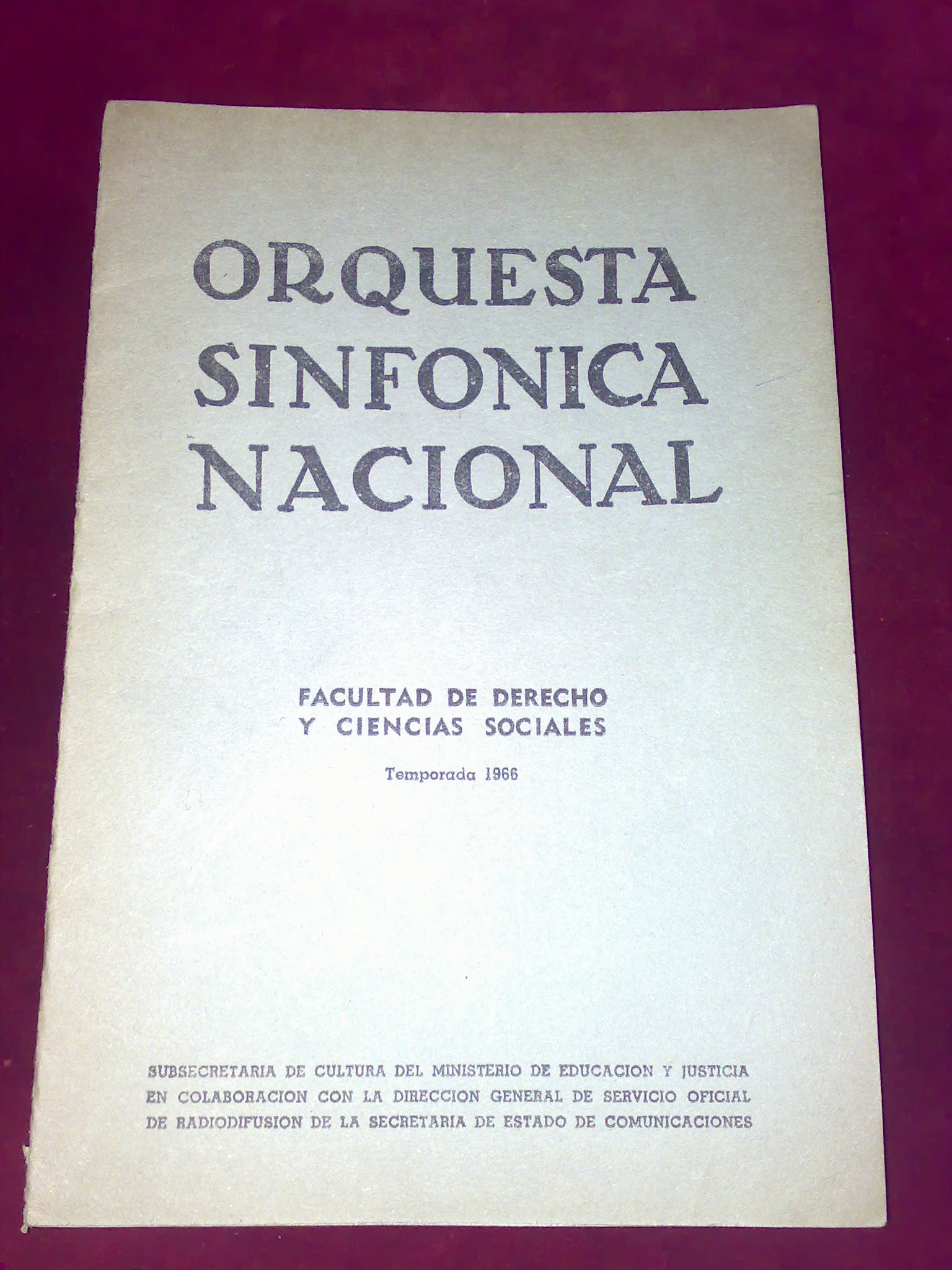
A playbill from 1966

The 1955 overthrow of President Juan Perón led to the State Symphony's reorganization as the Argentine National Symphony. Its first post-Perón conductor, former Colón Opera House Director Juan José Castro, had returned from exile and took the baton to acclaim on November 11, leading the symphony in their performance of La Mer, by Claude Debussy. He worked to widen its appeal by incorporating works by contemporary composers such as Olivier Messiaen, Paul Hindemith, Igor Stravinsky and Béla Bartók, and by securing guest conductors such as Willem van Otterloo and Igor Stravinsky, who conducted performances of his own works in 1960. Frustrated by bureaucratic tedium, however, Castro resigned in October.

The symphony followed a more traditional line after Víctor Tevah's appointment as chief conductor in 1961, and the contemporary music programs were cancelled. Its itinerary was steeped up, and would include a successful tour of theatres in the Argentine hinterland as well as in Asunción, Paraguay, in 1962. Highlights from this period included guest conductor Paul Klecki's Beethoven concert series and the rise to prominence of pianist Martha Argerich. Ongoing administrative disputes, however, took their toll, and the appointment of Teodoro Fuchs in March 1966 as its first full director since Castro met one the body's chief demands, though budget scarcities led to his resignation later that year.

The installation of a dictatorship under General Juan Carlos Onganía led to a marked influence of the Catholic Church over the repertoire, and its new director, Juan Carlos Zorzi, offered up mostly requiems, masses and te deums, as well as frequent collaborations with the Argentine Catholic University's choir. The symphony performed at the reinauguration of the Cervantes Theatre, which had been nearly lost to a 1961 fire, in 1968, though the Onganía regime's continuing hostility to the symphony led to its being stripped of a formal home, and the body performed as a radio orchestra. Losing numerous musicians, Zorzi resigned, and though the 1970 appointment of Spanish conductor Jacques Bodmer as director was followed by a sponsorship from the Italian Embassy, lack of federal support kept the symphony on the brink of closure throughout 1971 and 1972. The election of Peronist candidate Héctor Cámpora in 1973 brought with it restored support for the institution, including disbursement for a year's worth of unpaid salaries. A successful Beethoven series at the Luna Park Arena was followed by the 25th anniversary concert, November 29, 1974, memorable for its being held atop the Buenos Aires Sheraton with a televised reprise of Roberto Kinsky's inaugural program. A renewed funding crisis led director Bodmer to return to Barcelona in July 1975, however, and his assistant, Jorge Fontenla, was appointed in his stead. Fontenla's replacement with Bruno D'Astoli in 1978 coincided with the symphony's eclipse by the Buenos Aires Philharmonic, which enjoyed the advantage of a permanent home at the Colón Opera House (while the symphony was relegated to Monday nights at the Cervantes). Its struggles helped result in the 1980 establishment of the Friends of the National Symphony, and though the end of the last dictatorship in 1983 brought with it high hopes, a conflict with the newly appointed general director, Iván Cosentino, resulted in a stoppage during the first half of 1985. Ongoing budgetary problems prompted the new director, Jorge Rotter, to schedule free concerts to the public every other Wednesday as a form of protest during 1987. A renewed crisis in 1990 led to his resignation and the suspension of activities.

Lacking a director, the symphony was supervised by the head of SADAIC, José María Castiñeira de Dios, who organized the symphony's first European performance (in Spain), and secured appointment of Simón Blech as director in late 1991. Another figure credited with shepherding the symphony through this difficult era was its former director, Juan Carlos Zorzi, who had served as interim director during the early 1980s and continued to influence the repertoire, including more works by Latin American composers such as Mexican composer Eduardo Diazmuñoz, who led the symphony as guest conductor; Zorzi also took the baton for a tour of Chile in 1992. The appointment of Pedro Ignacio Calderón as chief conductor in 1996 was followed by a number of critics' awards and by the symphony's 50th anniversary celebrations in 1998, for which the body was invited to perform in Los Angeles and Tokyo.

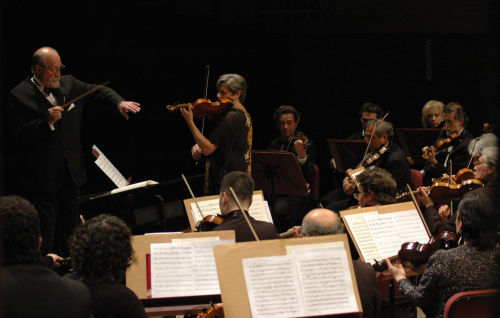
Pedro Ignacio Calderón and the orchestra

Obtaining their first salary increase in thirteen years in 2006, the National Symphony Orchestra has persisted over often overwhelming odds, not the least of which has been its lack of a permanent home (unofficially located in the Cervantes Theatre). Maintaining a loyal esprit de corps among its musicians, who have on numerous past occasions performed without pay, the symphony has also attracted figures of international stature on the classical music stage, including guest conductors Erich Kleiber, Sir Georg Solti, Ernest Ansermet, Igor Markevitch, Hermann Scherchen, Sergiu Celibidache, Rudolf Kempe, Antal Dorati, Sir Malcolm Sargent, Hans Rosbaud, Jean Fournet, Igor Stravinsky, Heitor Villa-Lobos, Aram Katchaturian, Frank Martin and Pablo Casals, as well as renowned guest soloists such as Arthur Rubinstein, Ruggiero Ricci, Nicanor Zabaleta, Gyorgy Sandor, Martha Argerich, Uto Ughi, and Barry Douglas.

Its need for an official home was addressed in 2006 with plans to create a concert hall for the symphony in the Bicentennial Cultural Center. The center's inaugural in the former Buenos Aires Central Post Office, scheduled for the Bicentennial in 2010, was later delayed, and the Belgrano Auditorium became the symphony's temporary home.
