= National Conservatory =

National Conservatory may refer to:

- National Conservatory of Dramatic Arts of Paris
- National Conservatoire (Greece)
- National Conservatory of Music (disambiguation)
