= Sylvia Kersenbaum =

Argentine pianist, composer and teacher (1941–2025)

- Born: Sylvia Haydée Kersenbaum; 27 December 1941; Buenos Aires, Argentina
- Died: 22 March 2026 (aged 84) Bowling Green, Kentucky, U.S.
- Genres: Classical
- Instrument: Piano

Sylvia Haydée Kersenbaum (27 December 1941 – 22 March 2026) was an Argentine pianist, composer and teacher. Among other things, she was recognized for performing the complete cycle of 32 Beethoven piano sonatas twice (in 1989–1990 and 2003–2004), and her music for the ballet The Masque of the Red Death, based on a story by Edgar Allan Poe.

== Life and career ==
Kersenbaum was born in Buenos Aires, Argentina on 27 December 1941, to an Austrian father and Italian mother. She began her musical studies at four years of age with her mother, and she started learning to play the piano before her feet could reach the pedals. She later studied with Angélica C. de Roldan and then enrolled in the Conservatorio Nacional Superior de Música (National Superior Music Conservatory) with the most renowned piano teacher in Argentina, Vincenzo Scaramuzza. She debuted in Buenos Aires in 1958 with Beethoven's Piano Concerto No. 1, receiving high acclaim. In 1966, she was awarded a scholarship by the Italian Government to study at the Accademia Nazionale di Santa Cecilia (National Academy of Santa Cecilia) in Rome, where she worked under the tutelage of Carlo Zecchi. She also studied at the Accademia Musicale Chigiana in Siena and with Nikita Magaloff in Geneva.

The Zürich newspaper Unterhaltungs Blätter said of her: "It is remarkable the number of young and qualified Argentine artists in recent years who conquered the European public. After Argerich, Gelber, Barenboim, you must add the name of Sylvia Kersenbaum, who in her debut in Zurich was a resounding success."

She toured in East Asia, Europe, New Zealand, the United States and Mexico. She has recorded music of Beethoven, Chopin, Brahms, Paganini, Tchaikovsky, Liszt, Weber, Mendelssohn, Schubert, Granados, Glinka, Schumann, Franck, Scriabin, Berg, Mozart, Ginastera, Rachmaninoff, Bach, Grieg, Dohnányi, Falla, Gershwin, Hindemith, Haydn, Janáček, Piazzolla, Ravel and Strauss.

In 1976, she moved to Kentucky to join the Department of Music at Western Kentucky University, where in 1990, she was awarded the top prize and served as professor emerita. While living in Kentucky, she spent over two decades as harpist of the Bowling Green Western Symphony Orchestra.

Kersenbaum died in Bowling Green, Kentucky on 22 March 2026, at the age of 84.

== Work ==
As a composer her highlights include choral works (two a cappella suites for choir and a cantata for soprano, tenor, choir and orchestra) and music for the ballet The Masque of the Red Death, based on Edgar Allan Poe's story of the same name and released by the Capitol Arts Center of Bowling Green, Kentucky in 2001.

She wrote several arrangements for piano, including "Bacchanale" from Camille Saint-Saëns' Samson and Delilah, "Träume" by Richard Wagner, "Cambalache" by Enrique Santos Discépolo, and "Bénédiction de Dieu dans la solitude" by Franz Liszt for cello and piano.

== Prizes and recognitions ==
- Honorary member of the American Beethoven Society after playing the cycle of the 32 Beethoven sonatas in 1990.
- Western Kentucky University Faculty Award for Research and Creativity (1990). In 2003, the university established a scholarship in her name.
- Records and Recording Record of the Year.
- In 1999, she obtained the Konex Merit Diploma for piano alongside Martha Argerich, Bruno Leonardo Gelber, Nelson Goerner and Manuel Rego. She was recognized as the most excellent interpreter of the last decade.
- Named "Best Instrumental Performer" by the Music Critics Association of Argentina in 2004.
- Included in the collection "100 Virtuosi of the 20th Century" by EMI for her version of the Liszt's "Hexameron".
- Received a Lifetime Award at Western Kentucky University during May 2020
