= Elena Smirnova =

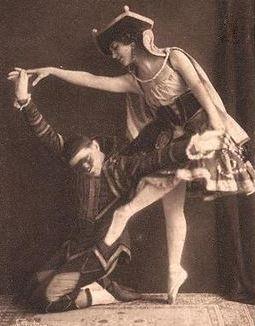
- Elena Smirnova and Anatoly Obukhov at the Mariinsky Theater in Saint Petersburg
- Born: Elena Aleksandrovna Smirnova; 18 May 1888; Saint Petersburg, Russian Empire
- Died: 15 January 1934 (aged 45); Buenos Aires, Argentina
- Other names: Helena Smirnova, Yelena Smirnova, Elena Smirnowa
- Occupations: dancer, choreographer, dance instructor
- Years active: 1900–1934
- Known for: co-founding the Russian Romantic Theater in Berlin and as the 1st professor of dance at the Argentine National Conservatory

Elena Smirnova (Russian: Елена Александровна Смирнова, 6 May 1888 (O.S.)/18 May 1888 (N. S.) – 15 January 1934) was the last prima ballerina of the Mariinsky Theater in the Imperial period of Russia. Starring in many leading roles, she often performed choreography created by Marius Petipa and Boris G. Romanov. Participating in early films of Germany and Russia, she made eight silent films and participated in the premiers of both the Ballets Russes in Paris and in the first performance of Russian ballet in Japan.

When the Soviets took over Russia, Smirnova fled with a group of artists, making their way to Berlin, where she and her husband founded the Russian Romantic Theater and performed throughout Europe until 1926. Experiencing a serious illness, she recuperated in Milan before relocating to Argentina, where she gave her last performance and became a dance instructor. She was the first professor of dance at the recently created Conservatorio Nacional de Música y Declamación. An annual award is given in her name by the National Dance School of Uruguay.

== Early life ==
Elena Aleksandrovna Smirnova was born on 18 May 1888 in Saint Petersburg, during the Russian Empire. (Note: Various Russian sources show the date as 6 May 1888 (O.S.). Her tombstone in the Chacarita Cemetery in Buenos Aires reflects the date 25 March 1888.) She began her studies at the Imperial Ballet School under the instruction of Michel Fokine and Pavel Gerdt. Noted as a child prodigy, she began to perform at the Mariinsky Theater while she was still a student. In 1900, she played the role of Manu, in the ballet La Bayadère and in 1905, in the choreographic debut of Fokine, she played the part of Hymen in the ballet Acis and Galatea written by Andrei Kadlec. Because of her good reviews, that same year, Fokine paired her with Georgi Rozai to dance to Polka with a Little Ball based on Pizzicato Polka by Johann and Josef Strauss. Completing her studies, Smirnova graduated in 1906, with her final performances as Titania in Marius Petipa's ballet of A Midsummer Night's Dream choreographed by Folkine and in two duets with Vaslav Nijinsky in a dance to Flight of the Butterflies by Chopin and to Waltz-Fantasia by Mikhail Glinka.

== Russian career ==
As soon as Smirnova graduated, she was accepted into the ballet troupe at the Mariinsky Theater and began to receive small solo parts. In 1907, she performed a pas de deux with Nijinsky in La fille mal gardée for which critics praised her technical execution but noted that her movement lacked melodic interpretation. The following year, she participated in a tour throughout the Russian provinces. In 1909, the year Sergei Diaghilev founded the Ballets Russes, she traveled to Paris, where she was listed among the company's principal dancers. She participated in the premiers of Le Pavillon d'Armide and "Polovtsian Dances" from the opera Prince Igor at the Théâtre du Châtelet on 18 May 1909. Smirnova's performance in both roles received praise in London newspapers, and the performances of "Polovtsian Dances" received enthusiastic standing ovations, which were credited with much of the fame Diaghilev's company received from the tour. In 1910 she worked with the Bolshoi Theatre and participated in tours in London and New York, and though she starred in several productions, they were not particularly successful.

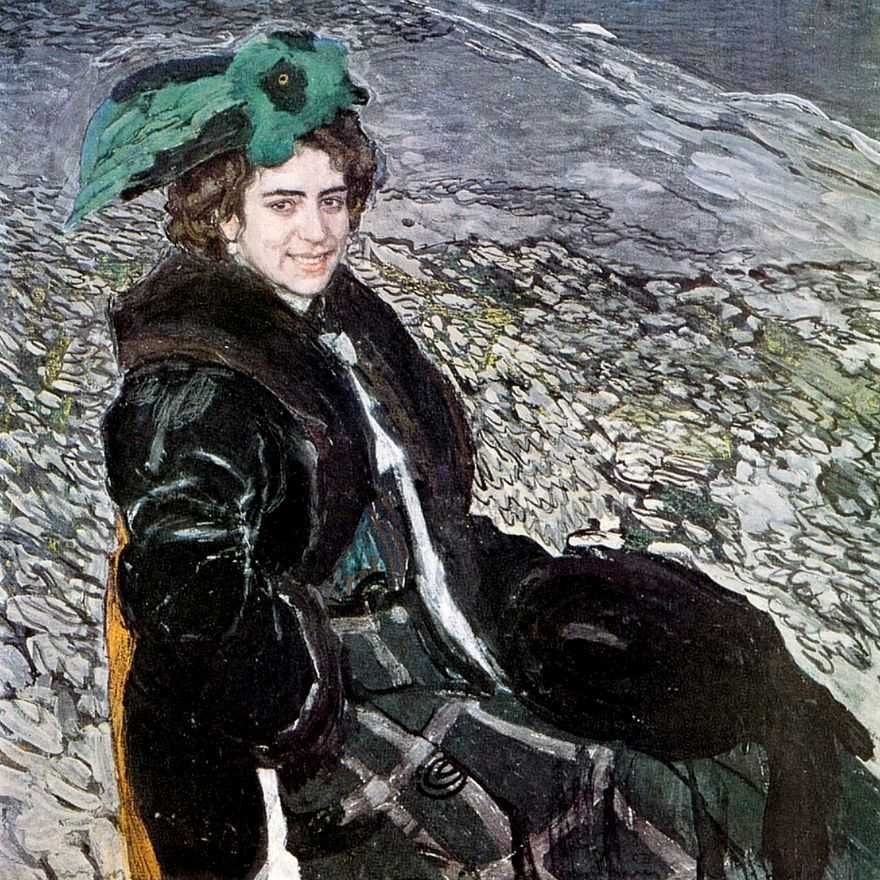
Elena Smirnova by Alexandr Golovin

In 1911, Smirnova performed in an alternating role of Swanilde with Elsa Vill in Coppélia by Léo Delibes. Critic Akim Volynsky called her performance heavy and complained that her "dances on point could be heard in the farthest corners of the Maryinky’s enormous hall". He liked Vill's performance better, but overall was unsatisfied with both soloists in the role. In her performance of "The Dance of the Frescoes" from The Little Humpbacked Horse, Volynsky praised Smirnova's power, stating that she "put her best foot forward", overall commenting that her emboîté was done "particularly well". In 1912, her role as Kitri in Don Quixote received acclaim by both critics and the public, which noted that the angularity of her performance in other roles, which seemed flawed, worked well in the production. Vera Krasovskaya noted that she was one of the best dancers who had performed the role.

Beginning in 1913, Smirnova made a series of silent films. A closed screening of a Berlin film Die Primaballerina (The Prima Ballerina) was released in April, showing Smirnova completing many of her own stunts. Several films followed, including Die Augen der Bajadere (The eyes of Bajadere, 1913), Anita Iverson (1913), Die Ehre der Japanerin (The Honor of the Japanese Woman, 1913), Das Geheimnis der schwarzen Maske (The Secret of the Black Mask, 1913), Die Kleine Geisha (The Little Geisha, 1913), Das Vermächtnis der Mutter (The Legacy of the Mother, 1914) and Zigeunerblut (Gypsy Blood, 1914). In addition, to film, her leading roles in ballet included many which were choreographed by Marius Petipa, such as Aspicia in The Pharaoh's Daughter, the title role in Raymonda, Izora in Bluebeard, Niriti in The Talisman and the title role in Esmeralda, among others. She was also the first to perform the role of Mercedes in the ballet The Andalusian by her husband when it premiered in 1915.

Smirnova was promoted to prima ballerina in 1916 and that same year was among a few dancers who performed at the Imperial Theater of Tokyo to great acclaim. The tour, under the leadership of Smirnova's husband Boris G. Romanov, was first tour of Japan by a Russian ballet corps. On the return trip, the troupe performed in Harbin, China and passed through Chita, Russia on their way back to Saint Petersburg. During the Russian Civil War, many noted dancers left Russia, which from 1918 left Smirnova as the only prima ballerina still working at the Mariinsky Theater. The theater name changed during the war to the State Academic Theater of Opera and Ballet (Russian: Gosudarstvennïy Akademicheskiy Teatr Operï i Baleta (GATOB)). During the seasons from 1918 to 1920, her most acclaimed role was as Aurora in The Sleeping Beauty. In 1919, she danced in the premiere of Romance of the Rose by Alexander Chekrygin in the role of Rosa and then on 8 February 1920, performed her last role on the Russian stage.

== European career ==
Soon after the performance, Smirnova and Romanov, along with Romanov's mother and daughter, Natalia, Anatoly Obukhov and other artists, clandestinely left Russia fleeing from the Bolshevik soldiers in 1920. Traveling in a hay cart, the group made their way to Romania and briefly performed in Bucharest. Then the artists moved to Berlin, where Romanov and Smirnova founded the Russian Theater a few months after their arrival in 1921. The theater was reorganized as the Russian Romantic Theater (German: Russisches Romantisches Theater) with the German dancer, Elsa Krüger the following year.

Financed by a wealthy German patron, the theater staged a broad repertoire dedicated to Russian arts and included ballet, opera and pantomime, with Krüger, Obukhov, and Smirnova as the principal dancers. Based in Berlin, the company toured capitals of Europe performing one-act ballets like Les millions d'Arlequin by Riccardo Drigo, Pastoral by Christoph Willibald Gluck, and Pictures of a Boyar Wedding, among others. They staged a critically acclaimed adaptation of Giselle, but many of their performances were avant-garde choreographies created by Romanov for Smirnova. In 1924, the troupe secured a seven-week engagement at the London Coliseum, which proved unsuccessful. It was followed by a financially costly tour in Spain, which caused their backer to reduce the size of the company by almost half. Struggling financially, from the fall of 1924 to spring 1925, the troupe toured several German venues, but in March 1925, Smirnova was ill. She required a major operation from which her recovery was uncertain. In the fall of 1925, Romanov began rehearsing Sergei Prokofiev's Trapeze, which debuted in Gotha on 6 November 1925 and then was performed in Hanover and Turin, before the company folded in 1926.

Leaving Berlin, Smirnova and Romanov briefly lived in Milan, where Romanov worked at La Scala and then served as the ballet master for Anna Pavlova's ballet company.

== Argentinian career ==
In 1928, the couple immigrated to Argentina along with Obukhov, because Romanov had been hired as the head choreographer for the Teatro Colón in Buenos Aires. Despite her slow recovery and continuing illness, Smirnova made her last appearance on the stage at the Teatro Colón that same year. She then became the theater's dance instructor, before being hired as the first professor of dance for the National Conservatory of Music and Recitation (Spanish: Conservatorio Nacional de Música y Declamación). Besides her work at the Conservatory, Smirnova taught private lessons at the Teatro Odeón and at her private studio, which was located at 500 Tucumán Street. Among her students were: Esmee Bulnes, Ángel Eleta, Maruja Pibernat, Mercedes Quintana, and María Ruanova.

== Death and legacy ==
Smirnova died on 15 January 1934 in Buenos Aires and was buried in the pantheon of actors of the Chacarita Cemetery. A dance prize given in her name is awarded annually by the National School of Dance of Uruguay.
