= National Conservatory of Music =

National Conservatory of Music may refer to:

- Conservatoire national supérieur de musique et de danse de Lyon, in Lyon, France
- Conservatoire de Paris
- Conservatorio Nacional Superior de Música (Argentina) in Buenos Aires
- National Conservatory of Music of Mexico
- National Conservatory of Music of America, a school founded by Jeannette Thurber in New York City in 1885
