= María Scheller Zambrano =

Argentine composer

María Scheller Zambrano (1917–1944) was an Argentine composer.

Born in Buenos Aires, Scheller Zambrano received a degree from the Conservatorio Nacional Superior de Música in 1937. Her instructors there included Rafael González, Ricardo Rodríguez, and José André. Her output consisted mainly of chamber music, including a number of sonatas for piano; she also produced a piano concerto.
