= Michèle Boegner =

French musician (1941–2021)

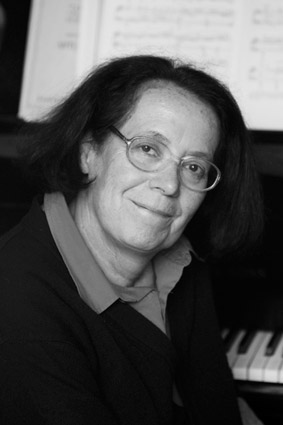
- Michèle Boegner, 2010

Background information
- Born: 12 August 1941; Lyon, France
- Died: 1 April 2021 (aged 79) Argenteuil, France
- Genre: Classical music
- Occupation: Musician
- Instrument: Piano

Michèle Boegner (12 August 1941 – 1 April 2021) was a French concert pianist.

At the Paris Conservatory she studied the piano with Marguerite Long, Vlado Perlemuter and chamber music with Jacques Février. She won her award at the age of fifteen. Thereupon she started an international career and won the Second Grand Prix at the George Enesco Contest at the age of seventeen. In parallel with her career, she subsequently studied at the Scaramuzza school in Buenos Aires and with Wilhelm Kempff and Geza Anda.

Michèle's career has been marked by Mozart, Haydn, Beethoven and Schubert and by French music. She has played all over the world, and in particular in Europe, as well as a soloist under the direction of most of the important conductors as in numerous solo recitals and chamber music concerts (from duo to sextet).

Her discography contains nineteen titles. In 2009 she recorded Mozart's eighteen piano sonatas and Fantasia in c minor K. 475 (released by Les Discophiles Français in 2010).
