= Lita Spena =

Argentine composer

Lita Spena (October 4, 1904 – February 6, 1989) was an Argentine composer, performer, and teacher who used Argentine folk tunes in her compositions.

Spena was born into a musical family in Buenos Aires. Her father, composer Lorenzo Spena, emigrated from Naples, Italy, to Buenos Aires in 1901. He founded the Clementi Conservatory and composed at least two operas.

Spena studied music with her parents as a child, then attended the Conservatorio Nacional Superior de Música Argentina, where she later taught. Her students included Ruben Ferrero and Waldo de los Rios. In 1929, she founded and began performing with the Argentine Trio.

Spena used themes from Argentine folksongs in her compositions. She composed songs based on texts by German Berdiales, Alfredo R. Bufano, Julia Crespo, Andre Gide, Horacio Guillén, Jorge Jantus, Carlos Mingo, and Juan Vignale. Her compositions included:

== Piano ==
- Preludios
- Sonata

== Theater ==
Pinocchio (story by Carlo Collodi)

== Vocal ==
- 30 Children’s songs
- Songs from Jujuy
- Songs from Tulumaya
- Songs of Love
- Listen to works by Lita Spena
