= Giovanni Nesi (pianist) =

Italian pianist (born 1986)

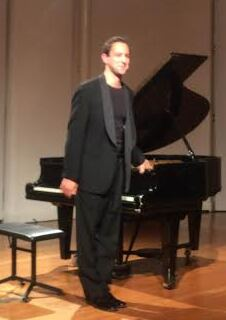
- Giovanni Nesi in 2016
- Born: 20 December 1986 (age 39); Florence, Italy
- Occupations: Pianist; Academic teacher
- Website: www.giovanninesi.com

Giovanni Nesi (Florence, 20 December 1986) is an Italian pianist and professor of academic music.

== Biography ==
Pupil of Maria Tipo and Andrea Lucchesini, winner of the "Clef du Mois" Prize by ResMusica in France, also awarded with the prestigious William Walton Award from the William Walton Foundation in Ischia, and the Rudolf Serkin Prize Award annually given by the Fiesole School of Music. Since 2014 he has recorded for the label Tactus. He recorded for Heritage Records label the complete Suites and Partitas by Domenico Zipoli for the first time on modern piano and a CD with works for piano left hand by Bach. He recorded a DVD for Mozarteum Universitat Salzburg. He gave concerts in Italy, France, England, Spain, Holland, Greece, Turkey, Austria, Mexico, Uruguay and Argentina. He played several times on broadcasts by RAI Italian national radio and television. In July 2016 he played a recital with works by Franz Schubert at Festival dei Due Mondi di Spoleto. In 2016 he played Beethoven at Ravello Festival, and in Rome for Accademia Filarmonica Romana. In 2016 he played with the BBC Concert Orchestra and conductor Jessica Cottis and at St. Martin's in the Fields, London. In 2016 he participated in the "Primer Festival de Musicología y Música Colonial Iberoamericana" (First Iberoamerican Musicology and Colonial Music Festival) in Montevideo, Uruguay. He has a stable piano duet with Federica Bortoluzzi. He currently teaches in the Conservatory of Livorno and in the School of Music of Prato.

On 20 October 2016 he offered a concert in which he played sonatas and partitas by Domenico Zipoli (1688–1726), at the Italian Institute of Culture of Mexico City. In November 2016, he played in an event organized by the group of "Amici della Diocesi" (Friends of the Diocese).

== Awards ==
- William Walton Award.
- Rudolf Serkin Award.
- Clef du Mois.
- Il Maggio del Pianoforte.

== Discography ==
- Mario Pilati: Suite for Piano And Strings; Bagatelle for Piano, Tactus (2014).
- Domenico Zipoli: Complete Suites and Partitas, Heritage (2015).
- Johann Sebastian Bach: Works for piano left hand, Heritage (2019).
- Original and Transcribed Piano Music for the Left Hand: Bach, Schumann, Brahms, Sollini, Wittgenstein, Scriabin, (2024)
