= Conservatorio Nacional Superior de Música (Argentina) =

National music conservatory for Argentina

The Conservatorio Nacional Superior de Música is the national music conservatory for Argentina and it is located in Buenos Aires.

== History ==
Ernesto de la Guardia, a member of the Wagnerian Society of Buenos Aires, first proposed the creation of a national conservatory. He gained support from the president Marcelo Torcuato de Alvear and his wife Regina Pacini a noted soprano, the Conservatorio Nacional de Música y Declamación (National Conservatory of Music and Recitation) was founded by Argentine musician Carlos López Buchardo, among others, on July 7, 1924. Based upon the School of Lyric and Scenic Art held at the Teatro Colón in Buenos Aires, the conservatory focused on both lyric and theatrical studies, providing instruction in composition, vocal and instrument music, recitation and speech. Carlos López Buchardo became the first director and the first assistant director was Enrique García Velloso. The conservatory began its operations at the Teatro Colón. Within a few years, in 1930 the Conservatory relocated to the upper floors of the Teatro Nacional Cervantes. In 1928, renowned Russian prima ballerina, Elena Smirnova was hired as the first professor of dance of the Conservatory.

In 1939, the name was changed to the Conservatorio Nacional de Música y Arte Escénico (National Conservatory of Music and Performing Arts) and it was renamed again upon the death of Buchardo at the end of 1948. The conservatory was renamed to honor its first director, and has since been known as the Conservatorio Nacional de "Carlos López Buchardo". In 1950, the Dance Department was split from the organization with the founding of the National School of Dance (Spanish: Escuela Nacional de Danzas) and then between 1957 and 1958, the Theater Arts Department was separated from the Conservatory to create the National School of Theater (Spanish: Escuela Nacional de Teatro). Moving several times in the 1940s, by 1982, the Conservatory established its current location (2017) in the Palacio Rocca Avenida Córdoba 2445.

== Modern organization ==
The National Conservatoire was divided in 1989 into the present and independent Escuela Nacional de Música (basic and first levels) and the Conservatorio Nacional Superior de Música (middle and high levels).

In 1995, the middle level of the National Conservatorium was assigned to the government of the city of Buenos Aires, which was in 1998 named Conservatorio de Música de la Ciudad de Buenos Aires.

== Alumni ==
- Alberto Ginastera – cello, piano, composition and conducting
- Gaston Rivero – Operatic Tenor
- Lita Spena – composer
- Sylvia Kersenbaum – piano
- Carlos Iván Cítera – piano
- Lilia Sánchez – Dalcroze Method
- Elias Goldzycher – piano
- Ana Lucia Frega – Music education
- Juan Maria Solare – piano, composition and conducting
- Jorge Alejandro Fernández – trumpet, singing and choreography
- Liliana Cangiano – piano, composition
- María Scheller Zambrano
- Elsa Berner – piano
- Polo Piatti – composer, piano
- Helen Glaisher-Hernandez – piano, arranger, academic MPhil (Cantab), Iberian and Latin American Music Society – Artistic Director
- Pedro Ignacio Calderón – conductor
