= Youra Guller =

French classical pianist (1895–1980)

Youra Guller (14 May 1895 – 31 December 1980) was a French classical pianist.

== Biography ==
Guller was born in Marseille as Rose-Georgette Guller, of Russian-Romanian heritage. She began her studies at the age of five. She performed in recitals and at the age of nine enrolled at the Paris Conservatory, where she worked with Isidor Philipp. In the 1930s, on the occasion of a concert tour planned for just 10 days, she stayed in China for eight years, returning to France on the verge of the Second World War and the invasion of German troops. As a Jew, she was forced to restrict her activities and to hide. After the war in the 1950s this prominent pianist performed only occasionally due to illness. She made her New York debut in 1971.

Youra Guller died in Munich at 85.

== Discography ==
- Youra Guller plays Chopin, CD-audio, 2007, ASIN B000NY16M4
- The Art of Youra Guller, 1895-1980, Albeniz, Johann Sebastian Bach, Claude-Beninge Balbastre, Chopin, François Couperin, CD-audio, 2005, Label: Nimbus, ASIN B0000037BU
- Beethoven piano sonatas op. 111 and op. 110, CD-Audio, 1973 (Erato), 1987 Nimbus
- Inédits de Youra Guller II: Schumann, Beethoven, Albéniz (Robert Schumann: Etudes Symphoniques, op. 13, Enreg. du 06.IV.1962. Ludwig van Beethoven: Concerto pour piano n° 4, op. 58, Orchestre de la Suisse Romande, Dir. Ernest Ansermet, Enreg. du 15.I.1958. Isaac Albeniz: Triana (Iberia), Enregistrement du 07.IV.1961. Archives inédites de la Radio Suisse Romande, Harmonia Mundi/Thara 650, 2008
