= Buenos Aires Philharmonic =

The Buenos Aires Philharmonic performing during their first season (1947) in Mar del Plata

The Buenos Aires Philharmonic (Spanish: Orquesta Filarmónica de Buenos Aires) is an Argentine orchestra based in Buenos Aires. Founded in 1946, it is based in the renowned Teatro Colón, and is considered one of the most prestigious orchestras in its nation and Latin America, and has received several honours in 60 years of history. Their local counterparts in the national aegis are the Argentine National Symphony Orchestra and the Teatro Colón Orchestra. The orchestra's current Music Director is Mexican Enrique Diemecke.

== History ==
The Buenos Aires Philharmonic was created in 1946 with the name Orquesta Sinfónica del Teatro Municipal, offering its first concert on May 21, 1947. Its first official conductor was Lamberto Baldi; years later, the position was taken over by Jaime Pahissa. In 1948 the orchestra changed its name to the Symphony orchestra of the city of Buenos Aires; this same year, celebrated conductor Herbert von Karajan conducted the orquestra on two occasions. In 1953 the orchestra moved to its permanent residence in the Colón Theatre and in 1958 adopted its current name.

During the following decades, the orchestra reached international prestige, performing with well-known national and international soloists. These included such pianists as Alfred Brendel, Martha Argerich, Lazar Berman, Alfred Cortot, Byron Janis, Rudolf Firkusny, Andor Foldes, Ivo Pogorelich, Nelson Freire, Bruno Leonardo Gelber, Arthur Rubinstein, Jean-Yves Thibaudet, Rubén González, Barry Douglas, Nelson Goerner, Peter Donohoe, Friedrich Gulda, Rudolf Buchbinder, Andras Schiff y Manuel Rego. Violinist included Gidon Kremer, David Oistrakh, Joshua Bell, Shlomo Mintz, Alberto Lysy, Ruggiero Ricci, Yehudi Menuhin, Itzhak Perlman, Midori, Gil Shaham, Jacques Singer, Henryk Szeryng, Salvatore Accardo, Leonid Kogan, Cho-Liang Lin and Uto Ughi. Cellists included Pablo Casals, Mstislav Rostropovich, Mischa Maisky, André Navarra, Natalie Clein, Sol Gabetta, Arto Noras and Yo-Yo Ma; Vocalists included Marian Anderson, José Carreras, Régine Crespin, Plácido Domingo, Luciano Pavarotti, Samuel Ramey, Jose Van Dam and Frederica von Stade; Guitarists included Paco de Lucía and Narciso Yepes. The orchestra also played with harpist Nicanor Zabaleta, clarinetist Wenzel Fuchs, horn player Radovan Vlatkovic, trombonist Jesper Busk Sørensen, flutist Sharon Bezaly and bandoneonist Ástor Piazzolla, among others.

Among the conductors that have worked with the orchestra, including already cited Herbert von Karajan, are Wilhelm Furtwängler, Sergiu Celibidache, Sir Georg Solti, Sir Thomas Beecham, Charles Dutoit, Lorin Maazel, Zubin Mehta, Rudolf Kempe, Clemens Krauss, Pierre Boulez, Igor Stravinsky, Malcolm Sargent, Antal Doráti, Ernest Ansermet, Rafael Frühbeck de Burgos, Eduardo Mata, Aaron Copland, Krzysztof Penderecki, Karl Richter, Luis Antonio García Navarro, Miguel Angel Gilardi, Mikhail Jurowski, José Serebrier, Michel Corboz, Robert Spano, Theo Alcántara, Leopold Hager, Ferdinand Leitner, Peter Maag, Igor Markevich, Stanislaw Wislocki, Jean Fournet, Franz-Paul Decker, Eiji Oue, David Lloyd-Jones, Yuri Simonov, Moshe Atzmon, Serge Baudo, Steuart Bedford, and Christof Escher, among others. Regarding Argentine conductors, some of the most noteworthy are Daniel Barenboim, Pedro Ignacio Calderón, Juan José Castro and Simón Blech. The orchestra maintains a strong collaboration with conductor Charles Dutoit, whom they have performed with recently.

Currently, the orchestra is conducted by Mexican conductor Enrique Diemecke. Maestro Diemecke has had earlier success conducting celebrated orchestras, such as the Royal Philharmonic Orchestra of London, the BBC Symphony Orchestra, the Orchestre National de France and the Los Angeles Philharmonic.

== Tours ==
The Buenos Aires Philharmonic has had three successful tours of special relevance: in 1992, 1994 and 1996. These tours have included stops in Germany, England, Spain, France, Greece, the Netherlands, Sweden, Belgium and Austria, and has performed in such prestigious venues as the Berliner Philharmonie, the Barbican Centre in London (one of the most famous cultural centers in Europe, also home to the London Symphony Orchestra), and the Concertgebouw of Amsterdam (home to the Royal Concertgebouw Orchestra of Amsterdam). The orchestra frequently tours nationally and in the surrounding countries of Brazil, Chile, and Uruguay.

== See also ==
- Argentine National Symphony Orchestra
