= Carlos López Buchardo =

Argentine composer

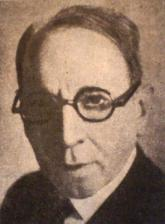

Carlos Félix López Buchardo (October 12, 1881 – April 21, 1948) was an Argentine composer of Classical music whose work was inspired by native music. He founded the Conservatorio Nacional Superior de Música in Buenos Aires, an institution that later became a department (Departamento de Artes Musicales y Sonoras "Carlos López Buchardo") of the current Universidad Nacional de las Artes.

== Life ==
Carlos López Buchardo was born and died in Buenos Aires. He first studied composition in his hometown and later pursued his training in Paris with Albert Roussel. Upon his return to Argentina, López Buchardo established some institutions that helped to shape musical life in his country. He founded the Conservatorio Nacional in Buenos Aires in 1924. He also established the School of Fine Arts of the La Plata University. He held various administrative positions, including that of Director of the Teatro Colón.

His vocal output consists of operas, masses, musical comedies, and some fifty songs. Upon his death in 1948 the Conservatorio Nacional was named after López Buchardo.
