= Vincenzo Scaramuzza =

Italian-Argentine pianist (1885–1968)

Vincenzo Scaramuzza (also known as Vicente Scaramuzza; 1885–1968) was an Italian pianist and music teacher.

== Biography ==
Scaramuzza was born in Crotone, Italy, on June 19, 1885. Introduced to the piano by his father, Francesco, a renowned piano teacher, he started performing at the age of six. After passing a difficult exam, he won a scholarship that allowed him to continue his studies in the prestigious Academy of Music of San Pietro a Maiella in Naples where he met the best teachers of the time, like Florestano Rossomandi, Alessandro Longo and Beniamino Cesi. He was still very young when he got his diploma with the congratulations of the jury and began his career as a concert pianist, performing in the biggest Italian towns.

At the time it was difficult to get a teaching post in any of the Italian Academies of Music. Scaramuzza had to take part in a National competition for the best piano students of Italy. Only Scaramuzza and another student, Attilio Brugnoli, could get the highest marks; for various reasons, including because he was older than Scaramuzza, Brugnoli was given the major teaching post in the Academy of Music of Parma while Scaramuzza was awarded a consolation prize, a minor teaching post in Naples.

Disappointed and annoyed by the excessive bureaucratic rules of the Italian educational system that in his opinion hampered the freedom of expression of a teacher, after only two months teaching in Naples, Scaramuzza decided to leave Italy. It was the year 1907 when he moved to Argentina, where he really started his career as a teacher at the Santa Cecilia Academy of Music, in Buenos Aires. In 1912 he founded the "Scaramuzza Academy of Music". In 1920 he married a former student, Sara Bagnati.

He resumed his career as a concert pianist, performing in Argentina and Europe. He soon became famous as a virtuoso of the piano. He was well known all over South and North America and Europe for the wide variety of pieces he played leading him to mastery of his instrument.

However, his pedagogical calling was stronger than his concert artist career. Therefore, in 1923 he gave his last concerts, notably a memorable one in Berlin where he played three Beethoven sonatas (op. 31 n°2, op. 106 and op. 110) under the applause of Ferruccio Busoni. From that moment on he dedicated himself exclusively to teaching, perfecting his method for piano teaching. This method, based on an accurate study of the anatomy of the pianist, allows a complete relaxation of the muscles and tendons of the hands and the arms even when the pianist performs the most difficult pieces of music. As a consequence, the sound is always smooth and round, never metallic, not even in the fortissimo, and the performer is never troubled by any muscular stiffening. Martha Argerich recalled that Scaramuzza "always spoke of singing, of expression" and placed the emphasis on a "round sound". According to the Dizionario Biografico degli Italiani, he did not assign purely technical exercises, drawing them instead from the repertoire, and was relentless in the search for a sound suited to each composer. His students recall that he adapted the physical approach to the sound each passage required – "a fortissimo in Beethoven is not the same as a fortissimo in Liszt" – and that he explained his ideas through vivid analogies. Asked in a 1967 radio interview whether he represented the Italian school, he replied that there were only two schools of piano playing: "the one that helps you play well, and the one that doesn't".

Hence, Scaramuzza devoted himself only to teaching from 1923 onwards. His international reputation as a teacher came in the 1950s, when Martha Argerich won the Bolzano and Geneva competitions in 1957, and Bruno Leonardo Gelber took third prize at the Long-Thibaud Competition in 1961. He taught many well-known international classical pianists such as Martha Argerich, Michèle Boegner, Bruno Leonardo Gelber, Carmen Piazzini, Daniel Levy, Mauricio Kagel, Fausto Zadra, Nora Doallo, Alberto Portugheis and Enrique Barenboim, father of Daniel Barenboim, not forgetting Maria Cristina Filoso, and Monica Stirpari who released in 2008 a CD of homage to her teacher. He also taught tango pianists Arminda Canteros, Osvaldo Pugliese, Horacio Salgán, Atilio Stampone, Orlando Goñi, Antonio de Raco and Sylvia Kersenbaum.

He was also a composer. Among his few compositions were Bosco Incantato, a chamber music work, the opera Hamlet, left unfinished at his death, and four Mazurkas composed for the piano. Fragments of Hamlet were performed at the Teatro Colón on November 28, 1961, conducted by Enrique Sivieri with the Buenos Aires Philharmonic.

He left no record of his teaching system as a book, but one of his students, Maria Rosa Oubiña de Castro, reconstructed it from material he wrote down in his lifetime. The resulting book is titled Enseñanzas de un gran maestro, and was published in 1973. Furthermore, four other relevant books have subsequently been published: L'arte pianistica di Vincenzo Scaramuzza by Prof. Antonio Lavoratore in 1990, Le Moi intime du Piano by Pierre Tran in 2009, Vincenzo Scaramuzza - Il Maestro dei grandi pianisti by Panzica Pamela Ivana Edmea in 2012 and Vicente Scaramuzza. La vigencia de una escuela pianística by Sebastián Colombo in 2015 (new edition, Buenos Aires, 2020).

In 1967 his students performed the complete cycle of Beethoven's piano sonatas on Argentina's National Radio, in a series organised with him. In the last years of his life, Scaramuzza was compelled to stay in bed by a serious sickness, but he never gave up teaching: he had the piano moved in his bedroom and from his bed he kept on giving lessons to his students until the end. He died in Buenos Aires on March 24, 1968.

== Legacy ==
In February 2009 a plaque was placed on the house where he was born, in Via Pescheria in Crotone, and in June 2019 the city hosted an international conference in his honour. The municipal theatre of Crotone, named after him, opened in October 2024.

== See also ==
- List of Vincenzo Scaramuzza's students
