= Maria Tipo =

Italian pianist (1931–2025)

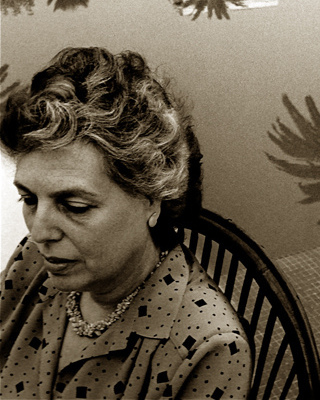
- Maria Tipo in 1987, photographed by Augusto De Luca
- Born: 23 December 1931; Naples, Italy
- Died: 10 February 2025 (aged 93); Florence, Italy
- Occupations: Classical pianist; Academic teacher
- Organizations: Conservatoire de Musique de Genève; Florence Conservatory; Scuola di Musica di Fiesole
- Awards: Geneva International Music Competition; Queen Elisabeth Competition; Ordre des Arts et des Lettres; Premio Presidente della Repubblica

Maria Tipo (23 December 1931 – 10 February 2025) was an Italian pianist who made an international career after she won the 1949 Geneva International Music Competition and came in third at the Queen Elisabeth Competition. She revived the music of Muzio Clementi and was known for playing and recording music by Scarlatti, Bach, Beethoven and Chopin. She taught at conservatories, Conservatoire de Musique de Genève, Bolzano Conservatory, Florence Conservatory and Scuola di Musica di Fiesole.

== Life and career ==
Tipo was born in Naples on 23 December 1931. Her father was a mathematician, and her mother, Ersilia Cavallo, a pianist who had studied with Ferruccio Busoni. She was taught first by her mother, to whose playing she listened instead of recordings. She later studied with Alfredo Casella and Guido Agosti.

Tipo won the 1949 Geneva International Music Competition at age 17, In 1952 she achieved third place in the Queen Elisabeth Competition (QEC). The prizes led to international recognition, many concerts and recordings. Arthur Rubinstein, a juror at the QEC, recommended her as "the most exceptional talent of our era", and his manager arranged a tour of the US, with a debut at The Town Hall in New York City in 1955. Harold C. Schonberg from The New York Times commented: "Whatever she touched came out with confidence and competence", noted "the verve of her playing", and summarised that she was "a pianist with an extraordinary potential". She played more than 300 concerts, earning the nickname "Neapolitan Horowitz". She often played chamber music with the Amadeus Quartet and the violinists Salvatore Accardo and Uto Ughi. She appeared as a soloist with orchestras including the Berlin Philharmonic, the London Symphony Orchestrathe Boston Symphony Orchestra, the NBC Symphony Orchestra in New York City, and the Los Angeles Philharmonic.

Tipo made her first recording, of 12 Scarlatti sonatas, in 1955, in just four hours as she said. It was named "the most spectacular record of the year" by Newsweek, and was successful with collectors and critics. She approached the sonatas differently from Horowitz who had been the first to revive them. Asked about the difference, she replied: "He was Horowitz. I am from Naples."

In the early 1960s, she was the first in Italy to suggest to record Bach's Goldberg Variations. She recorded the work in 1986 (June 26 and 28, 1986, at Salle Wagram, in Paris). That recording and a recording of Scarlatti Sonatas earned her a "Diapason d’Or" award. She also played and recorded music by Muzio Clementi, who had been relatively neglected. Martha Argerich called her "sensational" in an interview with Rai Radio 3.

Tipo played with strength and virtuosity; the critic Piero Rattalino recalled her playing as a teenager: "Her agility was incredible, and her precision greater than the volcanic Martha Argerich". He saw her in the "tradition of Italian interpreters that begins with Toscanini and includes Carlo Zecchi, Arturo Benedetti Michelangeli, Maurizio Pollini, Salvatore Accardo, Riccardo Muti, Claudio Abbado: interpreters who remain masters of their emotions and achieve the effect they want on the public." He concluded: "Maria Tipo is a knight errant, always ready to do battle for her ideal, even when this ideal takes the form of the Devil. [Her] ideal is beauty. There are other ways to make music, but this is certainly not the least of them."

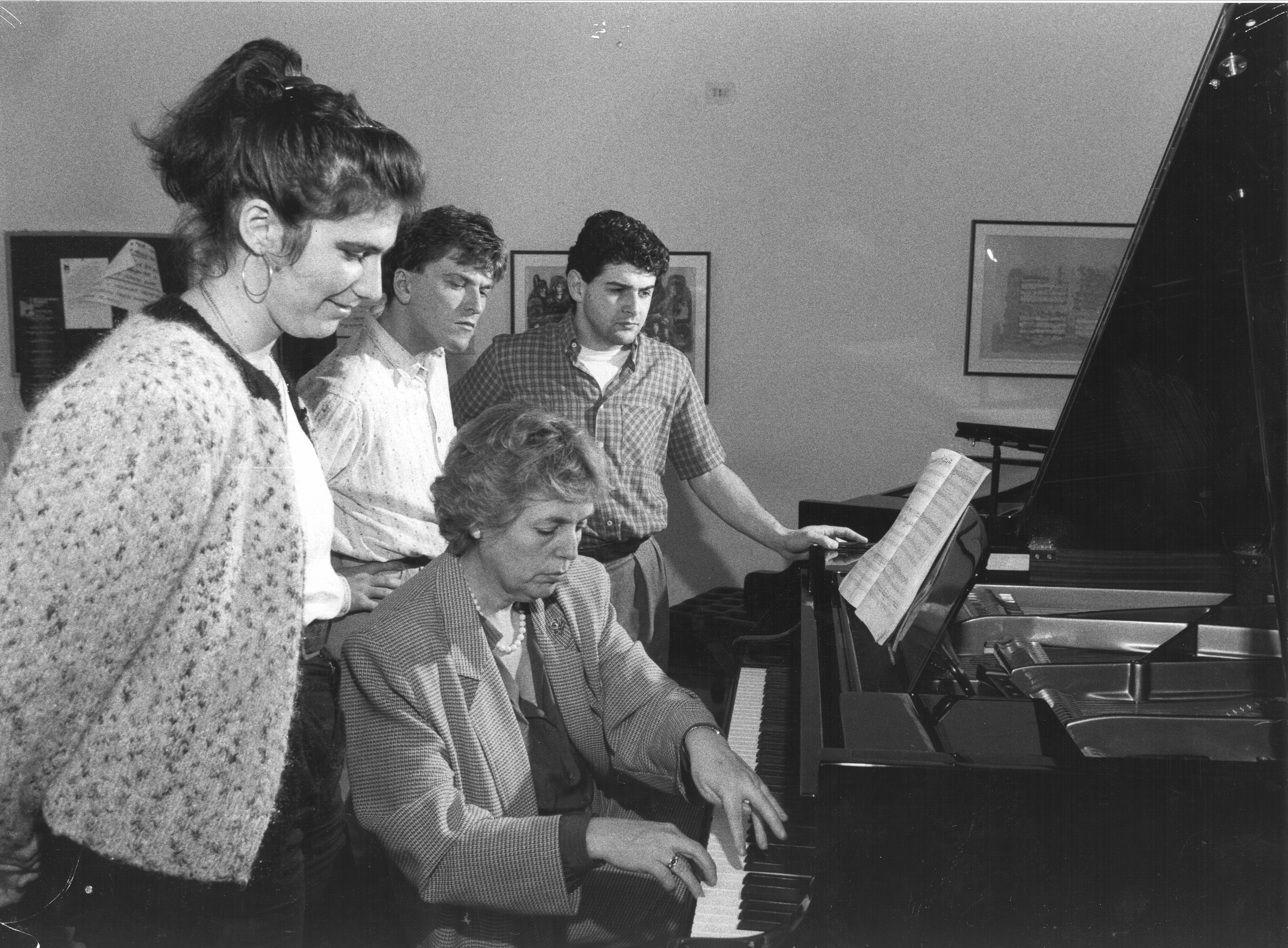
Tipo teaching in Fiesole

As a dedicated teacher, Tipo served as professor at the Conservatoire de Musique de Genève and the Conservatorio Claudio Monteverdi in the 1960s and 1970s, and from 1980 at the Florence Conservatory and the Scuola di Musica di Fiesole where she held a chair for piano from 1987 to 2009. Her students included Fabio Bidini, Nelson Goerner, Frank Lévy, Andrea Lucchesini, Pietro De Maria, and Giovanni Nesi. Many of her students won prizes at international competitions.

Tipo served on the juries of international competitions, including the Arthur Rubinstein International Piano Master Competition in 1983.

=== Personal life ===
In the 1960s, when she returned from solo touring in the US, she married the guitarist and composer Alvaro Company; they had a daughter. She found it hard to be an artist, wife, mother and teacher, and the marriage ended in divorce. A second marriage, to the pianist Alessandro Specchi, also ended in divorce. Her daughter, Alina Company, became a violinist who also taught at the Fiesole School of Music.

Tipo died in Florence on 10 February 2025, at the age of 93.

== Awards ==
Tipo was honoured as Officer of the Ordre des Arts et des Lettres, and received the Premio Presidente della Repubblica in 2021 for her outstanding artistic merits.
