= José María Castiñeira de Dios =

Argentine poet

- Born: March 30, 1920; Ushuaia, Argentina
- Died: May 2, 2015 (aged 95)

José María Castiñeira de Dios (March 30, 1920 – May 2, 2015) was an Argentine poet.

== Biography ==
Castiñeira de Dios was born on March 30, 1920, in Ushuaia. When he was 20, his poem Elegía del clavel was published in the literary supplement named LA NACION, who has led by Eduardo Mallea. When he was 21, he won the First Municipal Prize for Literature for his poem Del ímpetu dichoso along with Manuel Mujica Lainez and Silvina Bullrich.

In April 2015, he was hospitalized for twenty days after complications from pneumonia. He died on May 2, 2015, at 95.
