= Jesper Busk Sørensen =

Danish trombonist (born 1980)

- Born: 1980 (age 45–46); Grenaa, Denmark
- Genres: Classical
- Occupation: Musician
- Instrument: Trombone
- Member of: Berlin Philharmonic
- Formerly of: Aarhus Symphony Orchestra

Jesper Busk Sørensen is a Danish trombonist.

== Career ==
Sørensen studied at the Royal Academy of Music, Aarhus/Aalborg with Niels-Ole Bo Johannsen, Jesper Juul, and Rolf Sandmark. In 2002, he became second trombonist (later becoming the principal trombonist) of the Aarhus Symphony Orchestra. He underwent further education under Michael Mulcahy at Northwestern University. In 2009, he won the position of second trombonist at the Berlin Philharmonic, attributing this achievement to employing the Alexander technique during his studies with Mulcahy.

He premiered the trombone concerto Concerto Lírico by Bo Holten with the Aalborg Symphony Orchestra under Thomas Søndergård.

He is an honorary professor at the Royal Danish Academy of Music.
