= Bruno Leonardo Gelber =

Argentine pianist

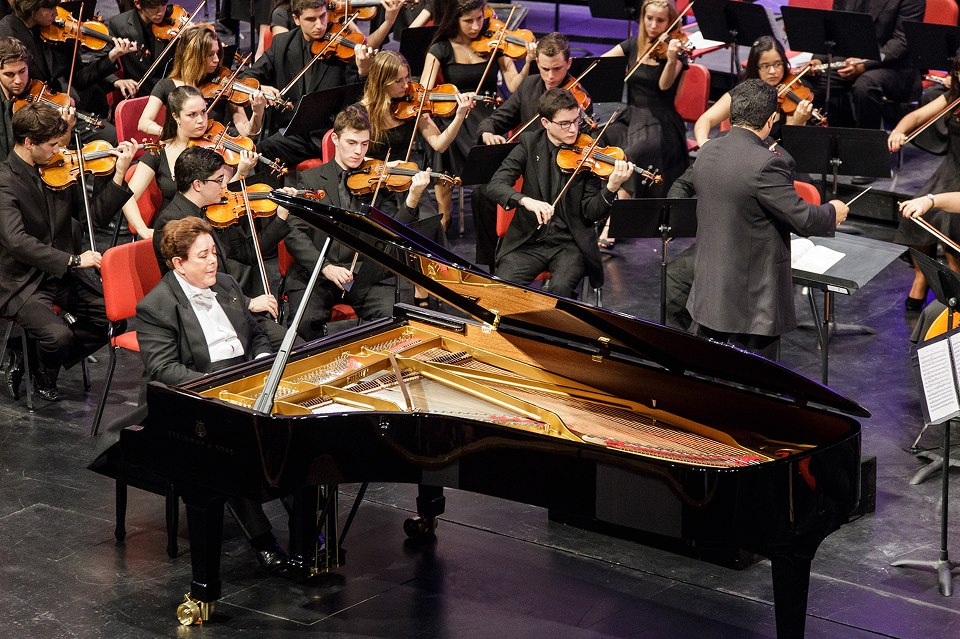
OJS with Bruno Gelber

Bruno Leonardo Gelber (born 19 March 1941) is an Argentine classical pianist.

== Biography ==
Gelber is an Argentine pianist born in Buenos Aires, with Austrian and French-Italian descent. His father was a violinist, his mother a pianist. He made his first public appearance at age 5, and commenced studies with Vincenzo Scaramuzza (the teacher of Martha Argerich) at age 6. He was confined to bed for a year with poliomyelitis at age 7, but made his formal recital debut when he was 8 years old. He retains a slight limp but does not need crutches.

When he was aged 15, Gelber played the Schumann Concerto under Lorin Maazel in his native Buenos Aires, attracting considerable attention. At age 19 he went to Paris to study under Marguerite Long, and the following year he won 3rd Prize in the Long-Thibaud Competition.

Gelber's career since then has taken him all over the world, and he has appeared with many of the world's great orchestras and conductors. He has made many recordings, including 19 of the complete sonatas of Beethoven. He specialises in the Classical and Romantic repertory, but came late to Rachmaninoff, due to the stubbiness of his fingers.

He resides in Monte Carlo and Buenos Aires, in the art deco Torre Saint in the neighborhood of Once.

== Honours ==
- Monaco : Commander of the Order of Cultural Merit (November 1999)
- Gelber's recordings earned him prestigious awards, including two Grand Prix de L'Académie Charles Cros and Le Prix de l'Académie de Paris.
