= Mozarteum Argentino =

Musical institution in Argentina

The Mozarteum Argentino is a private, non-profit musical institution in Argentina. It is an important musical institution in the country and provides scholarships to some of Argentina's most able musicians. The Mozarteum Argentino was established in 1952 and also organizes concerts, often over 50 a year.
