= List of compositions by Juan María Solare =

This is a selected list of works by composer and pianist Juan María Solare, with details as appropriate.

- Ligia Lieder (1993–94)
- Arriba los de abajo (Above those who are below) – It consists of seven pieces for Trio Basso (viola, violoncello and doublebass). (Cologne and Stuttgart, 18 May to 20 November 1998). [11'35"] It is dedicated to Heidrun Kiegel. Third prize in the composition contest of the "Viola Foundation Walter Witte" (Frankfurt) in May 2001. Premiered on 12 October 2002 during the German Viola Days at the Musikakademie in Trossigen by the Trio Basso (Othello Liesmann, Wolfgang Güttler).
- Black Bart – Black Bart is a musical theater study, for one preferably long-haired female singer. Texts from Charles E. Bolton. (Buenos Aires, May 1993 and Köln, February 1995) [1'10"]. 4 pages. It is dedicated to Ligia Liberatori and was performed by her on 17 July 2001, in the Aula 2 of the university in Cologne.
- Diez Estudios Escénicos (Ten scenic Etudes) is a musical work for the stage by Juan María Solare. It was composed at Cologne (Germany) and Mollina (Spain), June–July 1996, and is 20'00" in length, without text. For two actors, one actress, diverse objects and instrumental sextet: violin, doublebass, horn, bass clarinet, vibraphone and piano. It is dedicated to Mauricio Kagel.
- Epiclesis
- FAQ (Frequently Asked Questions)
- Gestenstücke
- Panther – Panther is a speech composition as electronic sounds (electronic music), after a text by Rainer Maria Rilke ("Der Panther"). Commissioned by the "Work-Group in Theater-Dance" (Tanztheater ArbeitsGemeinschaft) from the secondary school "Herder-Gymnasium", in Cologne (group conducted by Ligia Liberatori). The piece would be used for a choreography of the ensemble "Katastrophe Ballet". This composition was designed in Darmstadt and made in Cologne, in the studio of the composer, based on sound-samples of Ligia Liberatori (voice), Holger Müller-Hartmann (fagot), Gustavo Fontes (doublebass), Damian Zangger (tuba); and the voices of the pupils, in April and May 2001. [7'00"]
- Pasaje Seaver
- Passacaglia über Heidelberg
- Point of No Return
- Pope
- Schwächen
- Seis bagatelas
- Solidità della nebbia
- Two Still Lives in Free Fall
- Veinticinco de agosto, 1983
- Zugzwang – It is subtitled "Fifteen authentic miniatures about the strategy of chess" for quartet: violin (or flute), alto saxophone (or clarinet), double bass (or cello) and piano (or synthesizer). Cologne, 29 January – 6 February 1999. [3'15" in length]. Zugzwang is where a player (especially in chess) is forced to make a disadvantageous move because it is their turn. The work is dedicated to the chess grandmaster Lothar Schmid.
