= Abras =

Abras is a surname of French origin. It can be traced back to the 16th century in France. Notable people with the surname include:

- Caroline Abras (born 1987), Brazilian actress
- Juan Manuel Abras (born 1975), Swedish classical music composer, conductor, musicologist, and historian
