= Roberto Rufino =

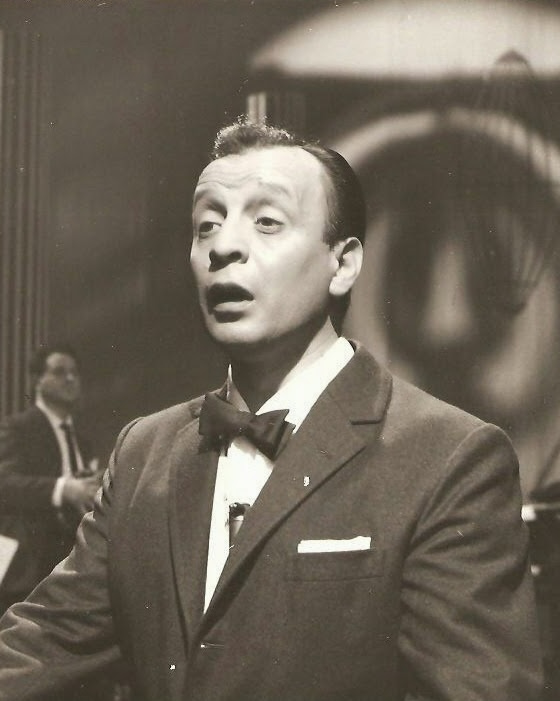

Background information
- Also known as: El pibe del Abasto, El pibe Terremoto
- Born: Roberto Rufino; January 6, 1922; Buenos Aires, Argentina
- Died: February 24, 1999 (aged 77) Buenos Aires, Argentina
- Genres: Tango
- Occupation: Singer
- Years active: 1930s–1990s
- Formerly of: Carlos di Sarli, Aníbal Troilo

Roberto Rufino (6 January 1922 – 24 June 1999) was an Argentine tango singer and actor. He was active during the genre's Golden Age of tango and is primarily known for his work with several prominent tango orchestras, particularly that of Carlos di Sarli.

== Life ==
=== Early life ===
Roberto Rufino was born in Buenos Aires, Argentina. He began singing at a young age in 1935 and made his first radio appearance in his early teens. By the late 1930s, he had become involved in the professional tango circuit in Buenos Aires.

=== Career ===
Rufino's professional debut occurred in 1939 when he joined the orchestra of Carlos di Sarli. He recorded his first track with Di Sarli, En un beso la vida, that same year. His tenure with Di Sarli marked the beginning of his visibility in the tango scene, where he became associated with a number of popular recordings.

Throughout the 1940s, 1950s, and 1960s, Rufino collaborated with several other leading tango orchestras, including those of Aníbal Troilo, Miguel Caló, and Armando Pontier. His recordings from this period include interpretations of tangos such as Malena and Cafetín de Buenos Aires. In addition to his musical work, Rufino appeared in a number of Argentine films and theater productions related to tango.

Rufino continued to perform and record into the later decades of the 20th century. He participated in tango festivals and maintained an active presence in the genre until his final years. In 1997 he was honored as "illustrious citizen of the city of Buenos Aires", and in 1998, as (illustrious citizen of the national culture.

=== Death ===
Roberto Rufino died in Buenos Aires on 24 June 1999 at the age of 77.

== Discography highlights ==
- En un beso la vida (1939) – with Carlos di Sarli
- Malena – with Aníbal Troilo
- Cafetín de Buenos Aires – solo recording
