= Persecuta =

Persecuta may refer to:

- Persecuta (Piazzolla album), a music album by Astor Piazzolla (1977)
- Persecuta (Piazzolla song), a tango by Astor Piazzolla (4th track in the album with the same name)
- Persecuta (Solare song), a music piece by Juan María Solare
