= Point of no return (disambiguation) =

The point of no return is the moment after which adverse consequences would commit one to a course of action.

Point of no return may also refer to:

== Film ==
- Point of No Return, a 1990 Hong Kong film starring Jacky Cheung
- Point of No Return (1991 film) or Touch and Go, a Hong Kong film
- Point of No Return (1993 film), an American adaptation of the 1990 French thriller film La Femme Nikita
- Point of No Return (1995 film), an Australian film
- Point of No Return, a 2000 Hong Kong film featuring Joe Ma
- Point of No Return, a 2018 film starring Steven Berkoff

== Music ==
- Point of No Return (ballet), a musical piece by Juan Maria Solare
- Point of No Return (band), a Brazilian band

=== Albums ===
- Point of No Return (Frank Sinatra album), 1962
- Point of No Return (Keyshia Cole album), 2014
- Point of No Return (Shareefa album), 2006
- Point of No Return (Systems in Blue album) or the title song (see below), 2005
- Point of No Return (World Saxophone Quartet album) or the title song, 1977
- Point of No Return, an unreleased album by 3LW
- Point of No Return (Havok EP) or the title song, 2012
- Point of No Return (Mr. Envi' EP), 2013

=== Songs ===
- "Point of No Return" (Centory song), 1994
- "Point of No Return" (Exposé song), 1985
- "Point of No Return" (Nu Shooz song), 1986
- "Point of No Return" (Systems in Blue song), 2005
- "Point of No Return", by Duran Duran from Astronaut
- "Point of No Return", by Electric Light Orchestra from Mr. Blue Sky
- "Point of No Return", by Gene McDaniels
- "Point of No Return", by Status Quo from Thirsty Work
- "Point of No Return", by Sunrise Avenue from Heartbreak Century
- "The Point of No Return", from the musical The Phantom of the Opera
- "The Point of No Return", by Immortal Technique from Revolutionary Vol. 2

== Television ==
- Point of No Return (TV series), a 2003 Hong Kong drama series

=== Episodes ===
- "Point of No Return" (Babylon 5), 1996
- "Point of No Return" (CSI: NY), 2009
- "Point of No Return" (Playhouse 90), 1958
- "Point of No Return" (Stargate SG-1), 2000
- "Point of No Return" (Star Wars: The Bad Batch), 2024
- "Point of No Return" (Star Wars: The Clone Wars), 2013
- "Point of No Return" (Supernatural), 2010
- "Point of No Return" (That's So Raven), 2005

== Other ==
- Point of No Return (play), a 1951 Broadway play by Paul Osborn, based on the novel by John P. Marquand
- Point of No Return (novel), by John P. Marquand, 1949
- Point of no return (computer games), a concept in computer games
- Point of no return, in air navigation, when an aircraft no longer has enough fuel to return to the airfield it departed from
- Point of No Return, a water slide at Noah's Ark Water Park, Wisconsin Dells, Wisconsin, U.S.

== See also ==
- Point of Know Return, a 1977 album by Kansas
  - "Point of Know Return" (song), the title song
- "Point of Know Return", a song by Alphaville from Salvation, 1997
