= Zugzwang (disambiguation) =

Zugzwang is a situation found in chess and other games wherein one player is put at a disadvantage because they must make a move when they would prefer to pass and not move.

Zugzwang may also refer to:

- Zugzwang, a musical work by Juan María Solare
- Zugzwang, a 2006 novel by Ronan Bennett
- "Zugzwang", an episode of the television series Extant (season 2)
- "Zugzwang", an episode of the television series Criminal Minds (season 8)
- "Zugzwang", an episode of the television series Lodge 49
- "Zugzwang", an episode of the television series Nemesis
