= Tango Monologues =

Studio album by Juan María Solare
- Released: 10 January 2010
- Recorded: September / October 2009.
- Studio: Theatersaal Universität Bremen
- Genre: Tango, Modern Jazz, Avant-garde, Latin
- Length: 79:20
- Label: Janus Music & Sound
- Producer: Juan María Solare

Juan María Solare chronology
Tango Nómade (2006)	Tango Monologues (2010)	Gardel al piano (2014)

Tango Monologues is the second studio album (and the first solo album) by Argentine pianist Juan María Solare. It was recorded at the Bösendorfer grand piano of the University of Bremen, Germany, and released in January 2010 by the label Janus Music & Sound, LC-24894, catalogue nr. JMS-001). Digital re-release of the album: 25 May 2013. Total length: 79:20

== Content / Track Listing ==
The album Tango Monologues features 20 tracks, from which 12 were composed by the pianist himself:

No.	Title	Music	Length
1.	"Danzarín"	Julián Plaza	3:40
2.	"Malena"	Lucio Demare	3:51
3.	"Bahía Blanca"	Carlos Di Sarli	2:19
4.	"Pasaje Seaver"	Juan María Solare	7:45
5.	"Valsarín"	Juan María Solare	3:00
6.	"Tengo un tango"	Juan María Solare	5:58
7.	"Para Lisa"	Juan María Solare	2:38
8.	"Bandoneón arrabalero"	Juan Bautista Deambroggio	2:08
9.	"Lo que se fue"	Jorge Pítari	4:28
10.	"Milonga fría"	Juan María Solare	6:54
11.	"Atonalgotán"	Juan María Solare	1:50
12.	"Fragmentango"	Juan María Solare	3:12
13.	"Akemilonga"	Juan María Solare	1:32
14.	"Niebla del Riachuelo"	Juan Carlos Cobián	4:16
15.	"La puñalada"	Horacio “Pintín” Castellanos	4:04
16.	"Calambre"	Astor Piazzolla	2:43
17.	"Liebergmilonga"	Juan María Solare	7:30
18.	"Talismán"	Juan María Solare	2:57
19.	"Furor"	Juan María Solare	3:31
20.	"Reencuentro"	Juan María Solare	5:00
Total length:			79:20

== Reviews ==
- Review by Pablo Bardin in Tribuna musical
- Review by Ray Picot in ILAMS (Iberian and Latin American Music Society), London
- Review in Rainslore's World, 2013
- Review by Dagmar Schnürer, "Offene Tango-Orchester", magazine TangoDanza, Bielefeld, Germany, July 2010)
- Review by Norberto Gimelfarb in the magazine Viva la musica (sixième série), mensuel de l’AMR (Association pour l’encouragement de la musique improvisée), Genève (Switzerland), décembre 2011, nº 327.
- Review by Lars Fischer, Wümme Zeitung, Lilienthal (Germany) 6 March 2010
- Review by Claudio Ratier in the magazine Cantabile nr. 61 (Buenos Aires, November–December 2011)
- Review by Christian Emigholz, "Juan María Solare gibt dem klassischen Tango ein neues Gesicht", Weser Kurier, Bremen, 16 February 2010
- Review by Daniel Varacalli, Revista Teatro Colón No. 100, page 128 (Buenos Aires, November 2011)

== official information and references ==
- Tango Monologues - album by Juan María Solare
- Tango Monologues in AllMusic
- Tango Monologues in musicbrainz
- Juan María Solare in AllMusic
