= Paris Water Company =

French water distribution company

The Paris Water Company (French:Compagnie des eaux de Paris) was a French company founded in 1778 that ran a steam engine-driven water distribution service which pumped water from the Seine into the city of Paris. This joint-stock company was listed on the Paris Stock Exchange. It was at the heart of the great stock market speculations under Louis XVI.

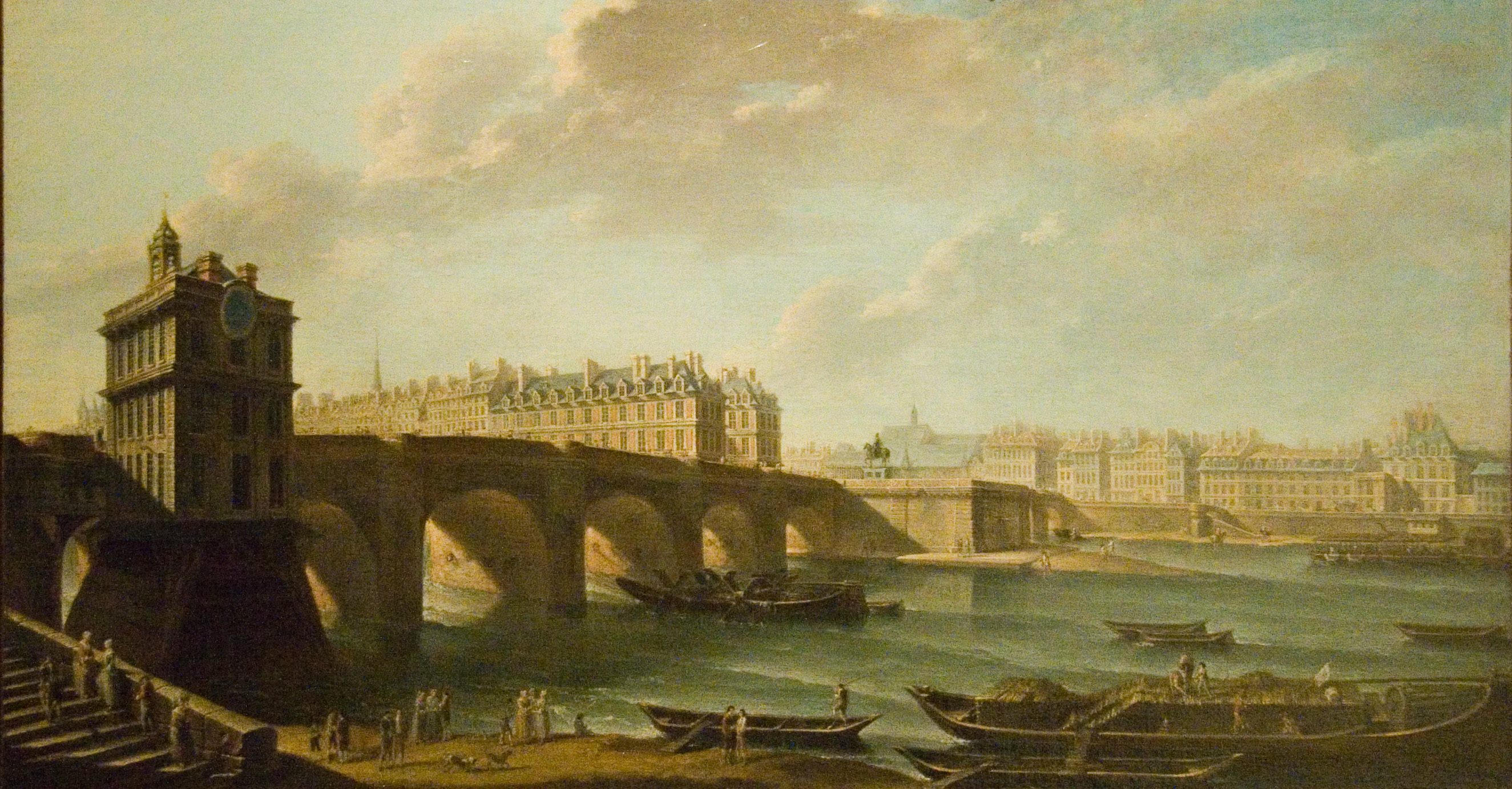
View of the de la Samaritaine pump at the foot of the pont Neuf, in 1755.

Until 1770, two dilapidated hydraulic machines, the Notre-Dame and de la Samaritaine pumps, provided the water needed for consumption in Paris. The water did not flow continually from the fountains, which were shut off at night, and some districts, such as Montmartre and Les Invalides, did not have any access to drinking water at all.

The Compagnie des eaux de Paris was founded in 1778 under the status of a limited partnership by the Périer brothers, Joseph and Casimir Pierre Périer, protegés of the Louis Philippe II, Duke of Orléans and Louis Philippe I, Duke of Orléans, who had invented a centrifugal pump. Their idea was to serve private houses, for a fee, by connections to the water of the Seine, pumped at the level of the plain of Chaillot. They wanted to supply commercial fountains where water would be sold directly to private individuals who took out a subscription, then to install "fire pumps" in Paris in the form of taps to fight fires and clean the streets. In 1781 they imported from England a steam engine invented by James Watt to pump water from the Seine, and brought the industrial tools for the Chaillot fire pumps. The pump began to work after that. Their network supplied the town of Chaillot (now district of Chaillot) on the right bank and the “Quartier du Gros-Caillou” district, in the current Quai d'Orsay, on the left bank, with respectively 4,100 and 1,300 m3 of water per day.

The company was authorized by letters patent of Louis XVI on February 7, 1777. It was the first truly private company listed on the Paris Stock Exchange, even though it depended on a public market. In the 1780s, the actions of the Compagnie des Eaux de Paris were the object of the speculation characteristic of the pre-revolutionary period, as were those of the Caisse d'Escompte and the new Compagnie des Indes, refounded in 1785. Its fragility caused a series of offensives against the Périer brothers, after the price reached a peak in the summer of 1786. The banker Étienne Clavière and his many friends in finance supported a competitor, the Entreprise de l'Yvette, created by Nicolas Defer de la Nouere (1740-1794) in 1787. In a pamphlet, Mirabeau declared the Périer brothers' project chimerical. He sided with the Entreprise de l'Yvette and gave as an example the company that Sir Hugh Myddelton (1560-1631) had created to divert over 60 kilometers, via an aqueduct built between 1608 and 1613, to bring the New River to Clerkenwell in London. In his Complete Works, Beaumarchais answers him with this epigraph: “Poor people! I pity them; because we have more pity for fools than anger.” (La Fontaine). He embarked on a battle of numbers, estimating the cost of the Entreprise de l'Yvette project at ten million pounds.

The shares of the Compagnie des eaux de Paris collapsed in the second half of 1786. The company then decided to create a subsidiary, the Fire Insurance Chamber, which was authorized on August 20, 1786, by decision of the King's Council. The latter authorized the division of the Company into two branches: insurance against fire and insurance on life, allowing him to launch in 1787, under the leadership of Étienne Delessert, life insurance products, with fixed premiums. and progressive according to the age of the insured, which results in insurance ranging from 1,000 pounds to 300,000 pounds. It also provided, within the framework of a wide range of services, pensions, benefits, dowries, life expenses, and even any capital on the death of any individual without capital whose existence would be precious to his family.

Since the company lacked capital, the city of Paris was forced to buy it back and became the owner of 80% of the shares of the Compagnie des eaux de Paris in 1788, the year of it commissioned a second pump. The Yvette Company was liquidated in 1793. Having been fired, the Périer brothers sued the directors of the company to obtain restitution for the 300 shares that belonged to them. They won their case by a decision of Parliament on September 22, 1790, which ordered the company to compensate them with 1.2 million pounds.

Emperor Napoleon Bonaparte placed all the production and distribution of water under the authority of the Prefect of the Seine and decided to build the Ourcq canal, followed by the drilling of the artesian well in Grenelle and the installation of fountains in almost all the residential courtyards in Paris.
