= Caisse d'Escompte =

Former French bank of issue

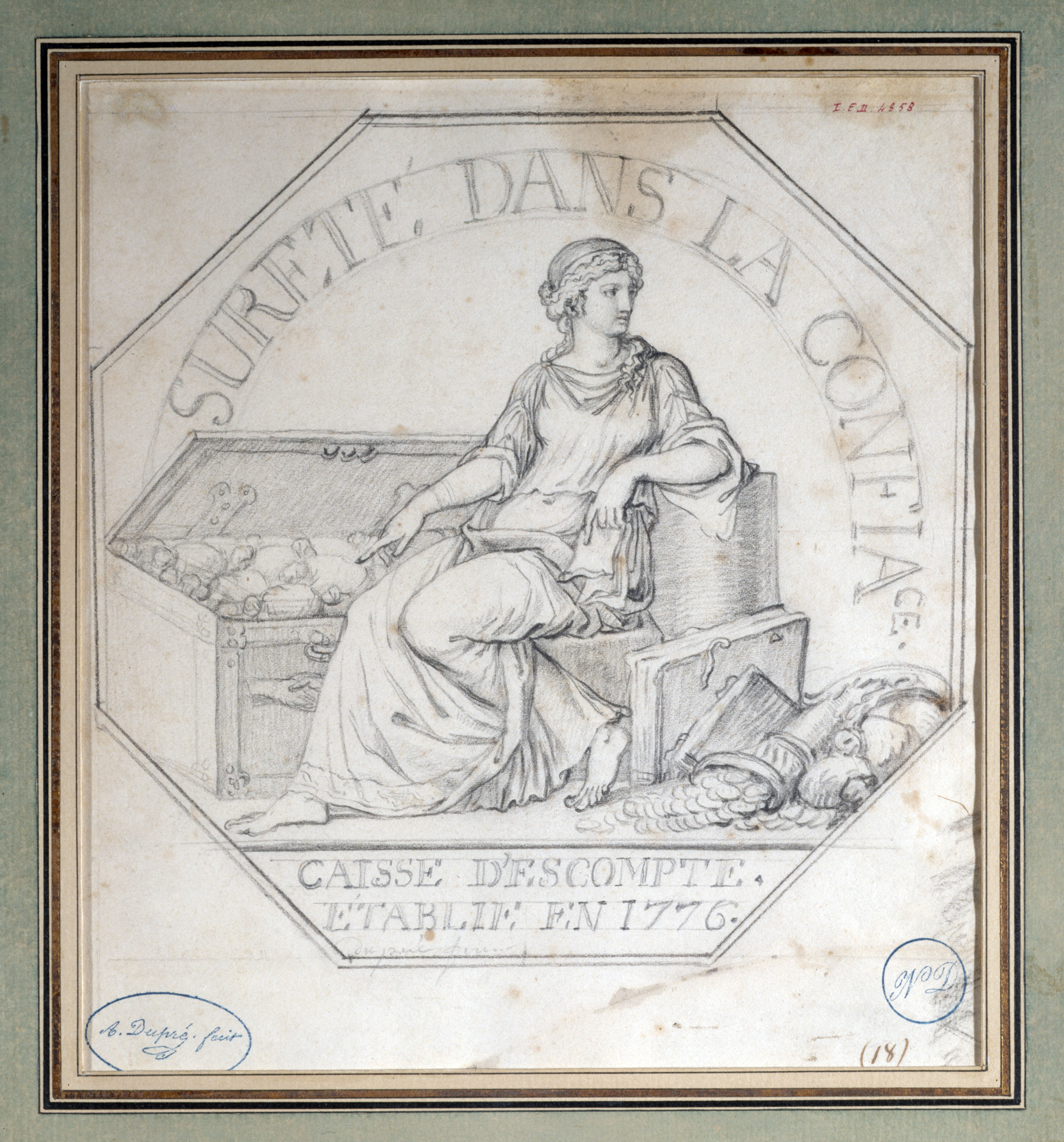
Emblem of the Caisse d'Escompte, draft by Augustin Dupré for a bank token, with the bank's motto "Sûreté dans la confiance" (lit. 'safety in confidence')

The Caisse d'Escompte (lit. 'discount bank') was a French financial institution and bank of issue during the last quarter of the 18th century. It was the next significant attempt to create a central bank following the collapse of John Law's Bank in 1720, and a predecessor to the Bank of France established in 1800, which was largely modeled on it.

The Caisse d'Escompte was established by financiers Isaac Panchaud and Thomas Sutton de Clonard in 1776 under king Louis XVI. Despite a difficult start and frequent episodes of stress linked to France's overall fragile financial situation, it developed promisingly until the French Revolution when it suffered from France's general financial distress. It was eventually terminated by executive order of the National Convention on 24 August 1793.

== Name ==
Following the failure of John Law's system, the word "bank" became associated in France with financial unsustainability and avoided by all new credit institutions. The preferred euphemism that was adopted in substitution was the word "caisse" which in French refers, depending on context, to cash (which has the same Latin etymology), box, counter, fund, reserve, or bank.

== Background ==
The searing boom-and-bust experience with Law's system in 1719–1720 delayed consideration of re-establishing a central bank in France, despite challenges with the existing system of commodity money and credit provided by individual bankers. Proposals to create a new national bank of issue were made by various scholars and analysts. Thus for example François Véron Duverger de Forbonnais, in a 1755 essay titled Mémoires pour l'établissement d'un crédit public, recommended the creation of an institution modeled on the Bank of England that would monetize France's government debt and facilitate state financing.

In April 1767, a new bank was established under the direction of Jean Joseph de Laborde, banker to the king, to address the financial stress at the French Indies Company. This entity was called Caisse d'Escompte. The bank employed two cashiers, Dollé and Bertrand Dufresne. One of the bank's major private shareholders were the Magon family, who then took over the building of the Caisse's head office, the Hôtel de Ségur. This bank turned out to be short-lived given the Indies Company's continued difficulties, and was eventually wound up in 1769 together with the Indies Company itself.

== Creation and early development ==
The Caisse d'Escompte was approved by royal edict of 24 March 1776 under the authority of Controller-General of Finances Anne Robert Jacques Turgot. The new bank was tasked with discounting bills of exchange and other commercial instruments in order to lower the interest rate on commercial credit and to facilitate trade. It also bought existing government debt in the market and lent back to the French state at the capped rate of 4 percent. The bank was initially capitalized at 15 million livres, divided into 5,000 shares of 3,000 livres each. The new venture was confirmed by a second royal edict of 22 September 1776. It had its seat on rue Vivienne, next to the Paris Bourse and to where John Law's Bank was located during its last year of activity.

Panchaud was in charge of management at the bank's start. He encountered great difficulty in raising the capital, which was reduced to 12 million in the course of 1776. The dividend was set at 1 percent, below market expectations, so that a collective effort by existing Parisian private bankers was needed to close the subscription. That painful process was only completed in early 1779 and ratified by royal edict of 7 March 1779, under the authority of Jacques Necker, by then the Controller-General.

The Caisse d'Escompte issued its first banknotes in January 1777. In April 1778, eight new Directors were elected, namely the bankers Jacques-Jean Le Couteulx du Molay, Louis Tourton, Théodore Rilliet, Pierre Cottin, Jean Girardot de Marigny, Jean-Baptiste Vandenyver, Jean-Pierre Louis Pache de Montguyon, and Jean-Louis Julien. From 1781 to 1783 (as again in 1791) the lead director was Parisian banker Étienne Delessert. During the American Revolutionary War, the Caisse d'Escompte started buying government debt securities, not least on the international market.

== Turmoil episodes of the 1780s ==
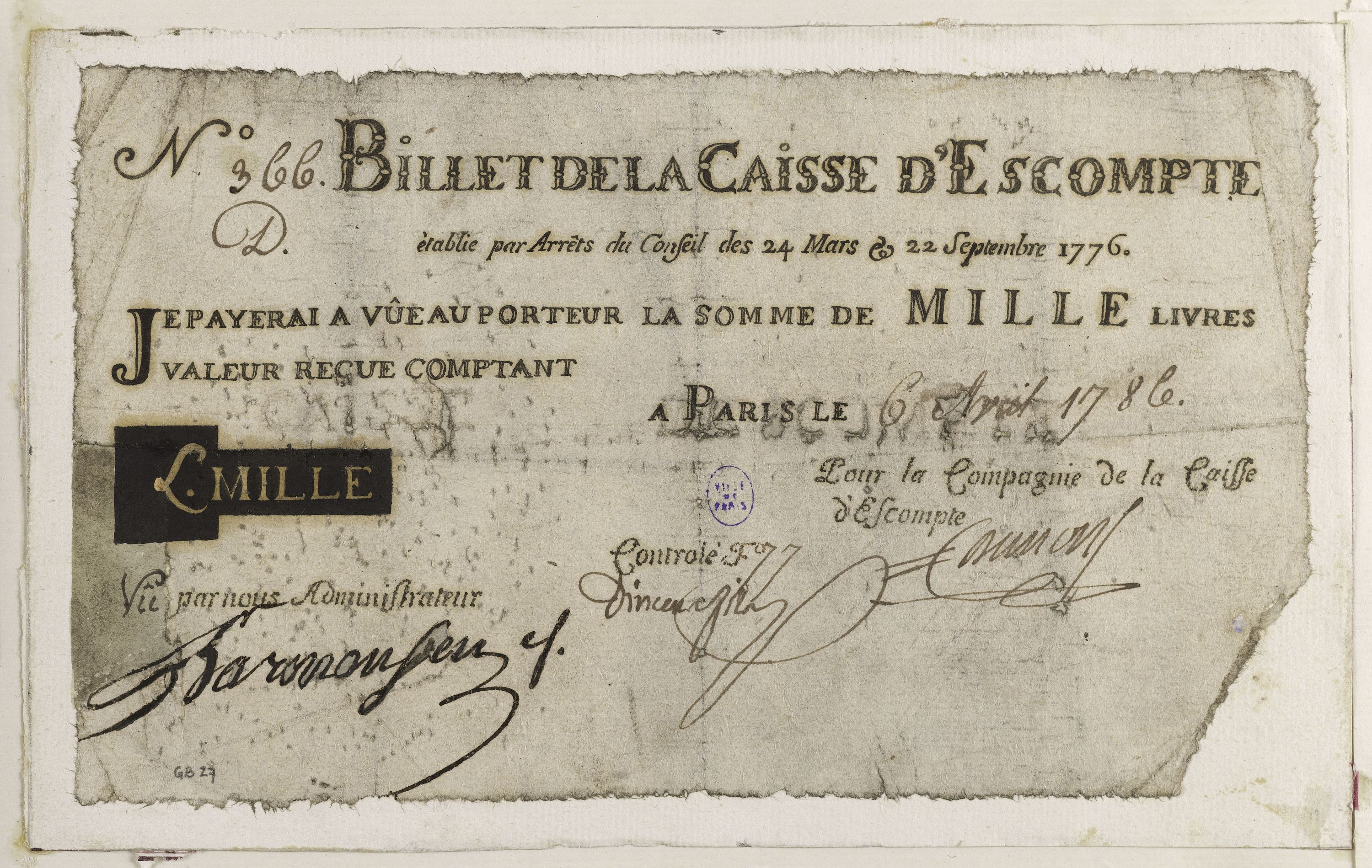
Note of the Caisse d'Escompte, April 1786

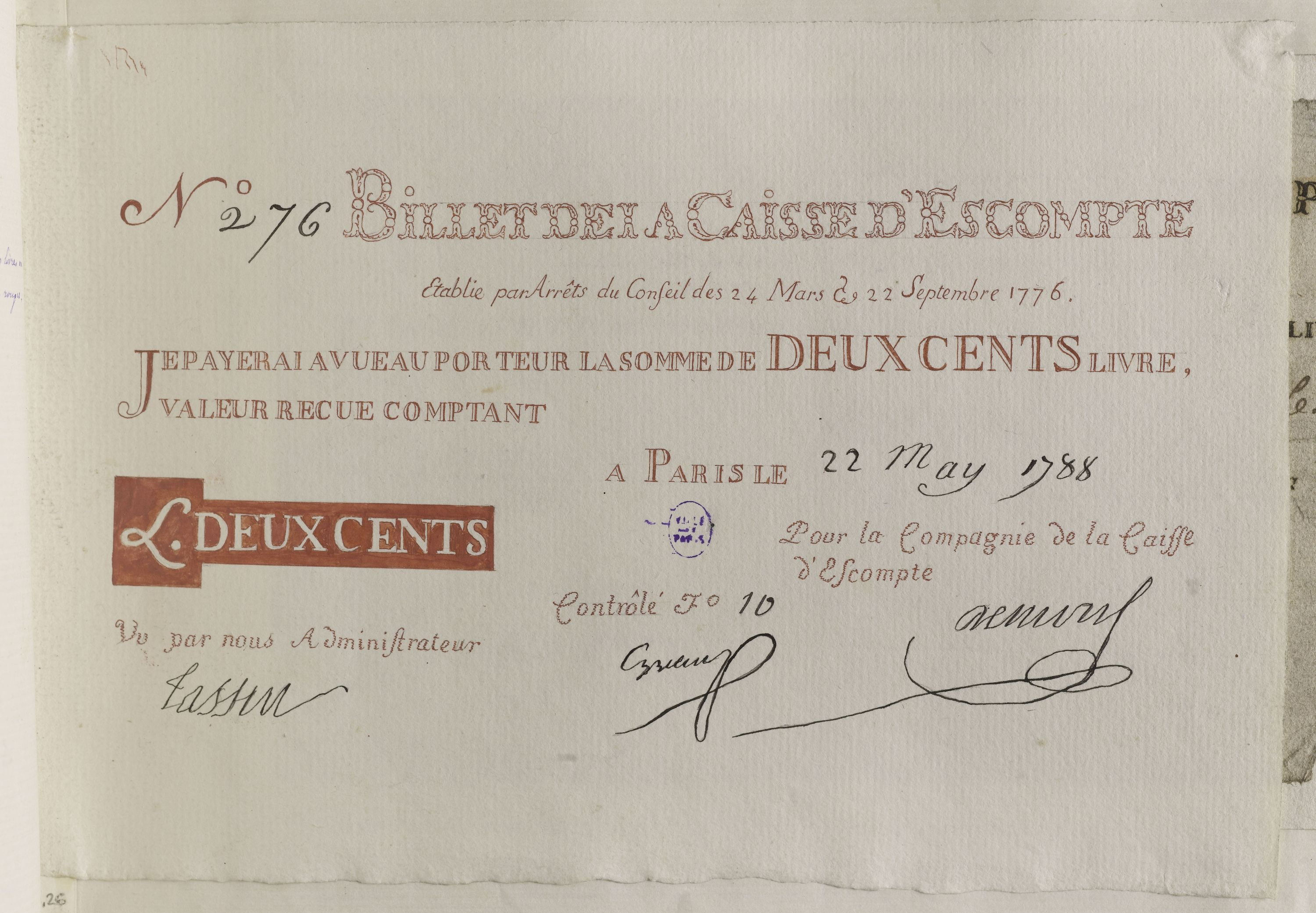
Note of the Caisse d'Escompte, May 1788

In the first quarter of 1783, the bank experienced liquidity stress related to the development of the American War and fears that the American government may not repay all its debts. In November 1783, the value of the bank's shares listed on the Paris Bourse fell from 5,000 to 3,000 livres. The French Treasury led a liquidity provision by withdrawing banknotes from circulation and recapitalizing the bank via a lottery loan that was well subscribed by individual investors, allowing the bank to restart payments on 23 November 1783. Thus the bank's capital was raised to 15 million livres, and the share price recovered. Panchaud, together with the young Charles Maurice de Talleyrand-Périgord, proposed a new financing plan that was well received by shareholders. On 27 January 1784, the general meeting increased the board's size to 13 directors and decided that the bank would keep at least 25 percent of its volume of money circulating in banknotes, in specie in its vaults.

Charles Alexandre de Calonne endeavored to expand the capital of the Caisse d'Escompte to attract more subscribers with the aim to provide more lending to the Treasury. In June 1787, the stock price reached 12,440 livres, with large volumes of market trading activity. During the summer, however, a poor harvest and rumors about Calonne's future led to significant withdrawals from the bank which depleted its cash reserve. The Caisse d'Escompte weathered that episode and subsequently gave a signal of confidence by purchasing a new property for its head office, the hôtel de Sénozan. In 1788 it launched an architectural competition to erect a new head office replacing that old building (which had been initially designed by François Mansart and known as the hôtel de Jars then hôtel de Coislin, the latter name a reference to Pierre du Cambout). Alexandre-Théodore Brongniart submitted a project. That project did not survive the revolutionary turmoil, and in 1792 the rue Rameau was traced on the location of the demolished hôtel de Sénozan.

More severe stress started in the next summer, following the announcement on 8 August 1788 of the Estates General of 1789. On 18 August, an edict of the king's council suspended the convertibility of the banknotes (a decision referred to as cours forcé). The resulting loss of confidence led to the resignation of Controller-General Étienne Charles de Loménie de Brienne on 25 August 1788. Necker returned as Controller-General, having replaced Loménie de Brienne in late August 1788, and increasingly drew on the Caisse d'Escompte to finance the government. The bank's directors failed to limit the corresponding exposure. The bank also had high exposure to the Spanish Banco Nacional de San Carlos whose own financial challenges further weakened its position.

In 1788, Antoine Lavoisier joined the bank's board of directors, even though he had no prior financial experience. Lavoisier subsequently became the bank's chairman. In an address to the Estates General on 17 June 1789, Lavoisier recommended the bank's nationalization, which was supported by Mirabeau who was among its longstanding critics.

== Revolution and liquidation ==
The Caisse d'Escompte was further undermined by the Revolution and associated scarcity of metallic money, and was viewed as unwelcome competition by the Caisse de l'Extraordinaire that was established in late 1789 to shore up the government's financial position. In November 1789, the Municipality of Paris established an office where anyone could exchange banknotes of the Caisse d'Escompte against écu coins. The Finance Committee of the National Constituent Assembly, led by Pierre Samuel du Pont de Nemours, reviewed the accounts of the Caisse d'Escompte together with those of the Public Treasury and authorized repayment of some of the government's debt. During 1790, however, the Treasury reduced the ability of the bank to discount treasury bills, thus eroding trust among holders. The scarcity of specie worsened. On 15 March 1791, new legislation ordered that notes of the Caisse d'Escompte be exchanged against assignats issued by the Caisse de l’Extraordinaire, which hence became the only paper money in circulation.

The Caisse d'Escompte was liquidated by decree of 24 August 1793. Two members of the National Convention, Pierre-Joseph Cambon and Joseph Delaunay, were appointed auditors of the sealed accounts. The Compagnie de Calonne was liquidated simultaneously, together with all other joint-stock companies such as the Paris Water Company. Delaunay was soon embroiled in controversy, arrested for corruption, and executed by the guillotine on 5 April 1794. André-Daniel Laffon de Ladebat remained then as the main liquidator and took over a decade to complete the task.

== Aftermath ==
Following the liquidation of the Caisse d'Escompte, France experienced a period of free banking with a number of banks of issue simultaneously issuing their own paper money. These included the Caisse des Comptes Courants, founded in 1796 by former shareholders of the Caisse d'Escompte, and the Caisse d'Escompte du Commerce, founded in 1797. Napoleon eventually founded the Bank of France in 1800, largely modeled on the defunct Caisse d'Escompte.

== See also ==
- Sveriges Riksbank
- Wiener Stadtbank
- Prussian Royal Bank
- Russian Assignation Bank
- List of banks in France
- List of central banks
