= Altes Rathaus, Vienna =

Building in Vienna, Austria

Coordinates: 48°12′43″N 16°22′15″E

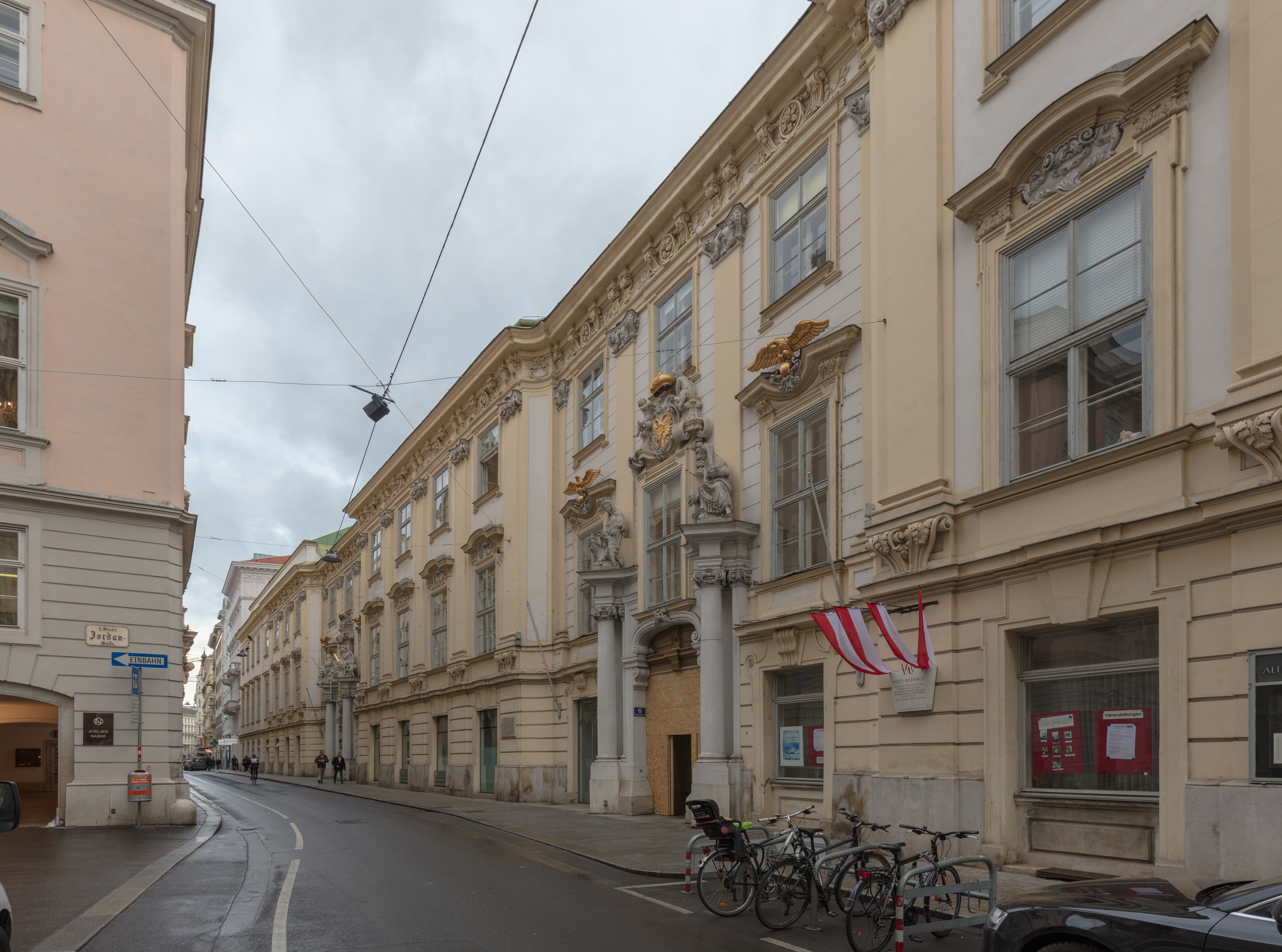
Entrance to the Alte Rathaus

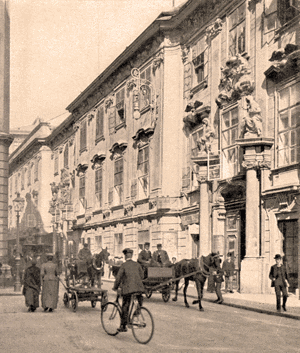
The Altes Rathaus in 1880

The Alte Rathaus (Old Council House) is a building in central Vienna, located at Wipplingerstraße 8, 1st District.

== Architecture ==
After several rebuildings, its exterior is now in the style of Johann Bernhard Fischer von Erlach, although the official rooms are in the Baroque style and some Gothic elements are still recognisable. The entrance gate dates to 1700. The courtyard contains the 1741 Andromeda Fountain designed by Georg Raphael Donner, whilst behind the courtyard is the 14th century Gothic Sankt Salvator church. The council chamber was redesigned between 1851 and 1853 by the Viennese architect Ferdinand Fellner the Elder.

== History ==
Frederick the Fair donated the original building on the site to the city council in 1316 and has been owned by the city ever since. It was the site of the execution of Franz III. Nádasdy on 30 April 1671 in the wake of the Magnate conspiracy.

In 1706, the Wiener Stadtbank was established and started operations in the city hall building, and remained there until 1754.

On 26 May 1848, during Vienna's March Revolution, it housed meetings of the People's Security Committee, as memorialised by a plaque on the building. Since 1871 Sankt Salvator has been in the care of the Old Catholic Church of Austria, which was founded by those rejecting the doctrine of papal infallibility, though that new religious community was only recognised by the Austrian state in 1877.

The Altes Rathaus last housed a meeting of Vienna's city council on 20 June 1885, with the first at the Neue Rathaus three days later. The Altes Rathaus now houses the municipal offices for the 1st and 8th districts of the city, the inner city's local history museum (Bezirksmuseum Innere Stadt) and the Documentation Centre of Austrian Resistance.

In 1893, it was the site of the founding of the Allgemeiner Österreichischer Frauenverein.
