= Gestenstücke =

Gestenstücke ("Pieces with gestures" or "gesture pieces") is a key work by Argentine-born composer Juan María Solare for four performers (mimes). In this piece, mute gestures are ordered with musical rules, following Solare's main conception of Neues Musiktheater: "To order non-musical elements (even non-sounding ones) with musical rules".

The work was composed in a hurry in the train Berlin to Bremen on 13 April 2008 (Solare needed urgently new material for his seminar on music theatre at the University of Bremen) with a total duration of about 13 minutes. Its parts are:

1. Canon a 4. [3'00] Premiere: Ensemble Neues Musiktheater (Wolfgang Dürr, Mauricio López, Lidia Revina, Nalini Bhat; conductor: Juan María Solare), University of Bremen, 12 June 2008.
2. Acumulación-Desacumulación 1. [2'00] Premiere: Ensemble Neues Musiktheater (Wolfgang Dürr, Aylin Leysieffer, Joaquín Buitrago & Mauricio López; conductor: Juan María Solare) on 5 February 2009 at the theatre of the University of Bremen.
3. Tutti unisono. [3'00]
4. Acumulación-Desacumulación 2. [2'00]
5. Gruppendialog. [3'00]
