= Schwächen =

Composition by Juan María Solare

Schwächen [Weaknesses] (Bert Brecht), is a work by Juan María Solare for any voice and any melodic instrument. It was composed in Cologne, Germany, in November 1993, and lasts two minutes. It was first performed in two versions: by Ligia Liberatori (soprano) and Ulrich Krieger (tenor saxophone), and by Richard Mix (bass) and Ulrich Krieger during the Vacation Courses of New Music in Darmstadt, Germany, on 3 August 1994.

The poem, first published under Brecht's name, is now attributed to Margarete Steffin.
