= Himmelsrichtungen =

Studio album by Juan María Solare
- Released: March 20, 2016
- Recorded: 30 September 2014
- Studio: Theatersaal Universität Bremen
- Genre: classical, contemporary classical music
- Length: 18:00
- Label: Janus Music & Sound
- Producer: Juan María Solare

Juan María Solare chronology
Vorzeichen der Nacht (2015)	Himmelsrichtungen (2016)	Shakespeare's Winks (2016)

Himmelsrichtungen (Cardinal Points) is the eighth studio album by pianist/composer Juan María Solare, released on 20 March 2016 in the label Janus Music & Sound (based in Germany). The album is a digital only release.

Recorded at the Theatersaal of the university of Bremen (Germany) on 30 September 2014. Grand piano Bösendorfer. Cover image by the British artist Alban Low. UPC: 5054227090752

== Reception ==
During the first month after release, the first track (Siesta Norteña) was included in Spotify's official playlist "Fresh Finds - Cyclone". As for 31 August 2016, two of the six tracks are among Solare's top five listened tracks on Spotify.

== The composition itself ==
Himmelsrichtungen is a piano cycle in which to the usual four cardinal points two were added (zenith and nadir), to achieve a three-dimensional room. The piano cycle has been composed in September–October 2004. The whole cycle (20 minutes long) is dedicated to different members of the Dehning family. ISWC (International Standard Musical Work Code): T-802.175.109-8

== Track listing ==
No.	Title	Artist(s)	Length	ISRC
1	Siesta norteña	Juan María Solare	3:07	GBKPL1522945
2	Viento del este	Juan María Solare	4:04	GBKPL1522946
3	Un poco más al oeste	Juan María Solare	3:53	GBKPL1522947
4	La voz del sur	Juan María Solare	1:40	GBKPL1522948
5	Cenit	Juan María Solare	2:17	GBKPL1522949
6	Nadir	Juan María Solare	3:30	GBKPL1522950
