= Passacaglia über Heidelberg =

Musical work by Juan Maria Solare

Passacaglia über Heidelberg is a musical work by Juan Maria Solare for clarinet, violin and cello (Cologne, 30 January–11 February 1996) [7'00"]. It is dedicated to the city of Heidelberg on the occasion of its 800th anniversary.

== Performances and recordings ==
It was first performed on 4 April 1997 by Martin Vogel (clarinet), Mayumi Hasegawa (violin) and Monika Schwamberger (cello) at the Church of the Holy Spirit in Heidelberg, as first piece of the opening concert of the 11th Festival "Gegenwelten" for New Music, organized by the Kulturinstitut Komponistinnen. A fragment of this recording was aired on 15 April 1997, in the programme "World of classical music" of the Latin American desk of the radio Deutsche Welle. It was performed again by the Ensemble Octandre in Bologna on 29 March 2000 and on 8 November 2000. Performed at the Círculo de Bellas Artes of Madrid on 12 July 2001 by members of the JONDE (Joven Orquesta Nacional de España); the concert was repeated in Segovia on 1 August 2001.
