= Wiener Stadtbank =

Early note-issuing bank in Austria

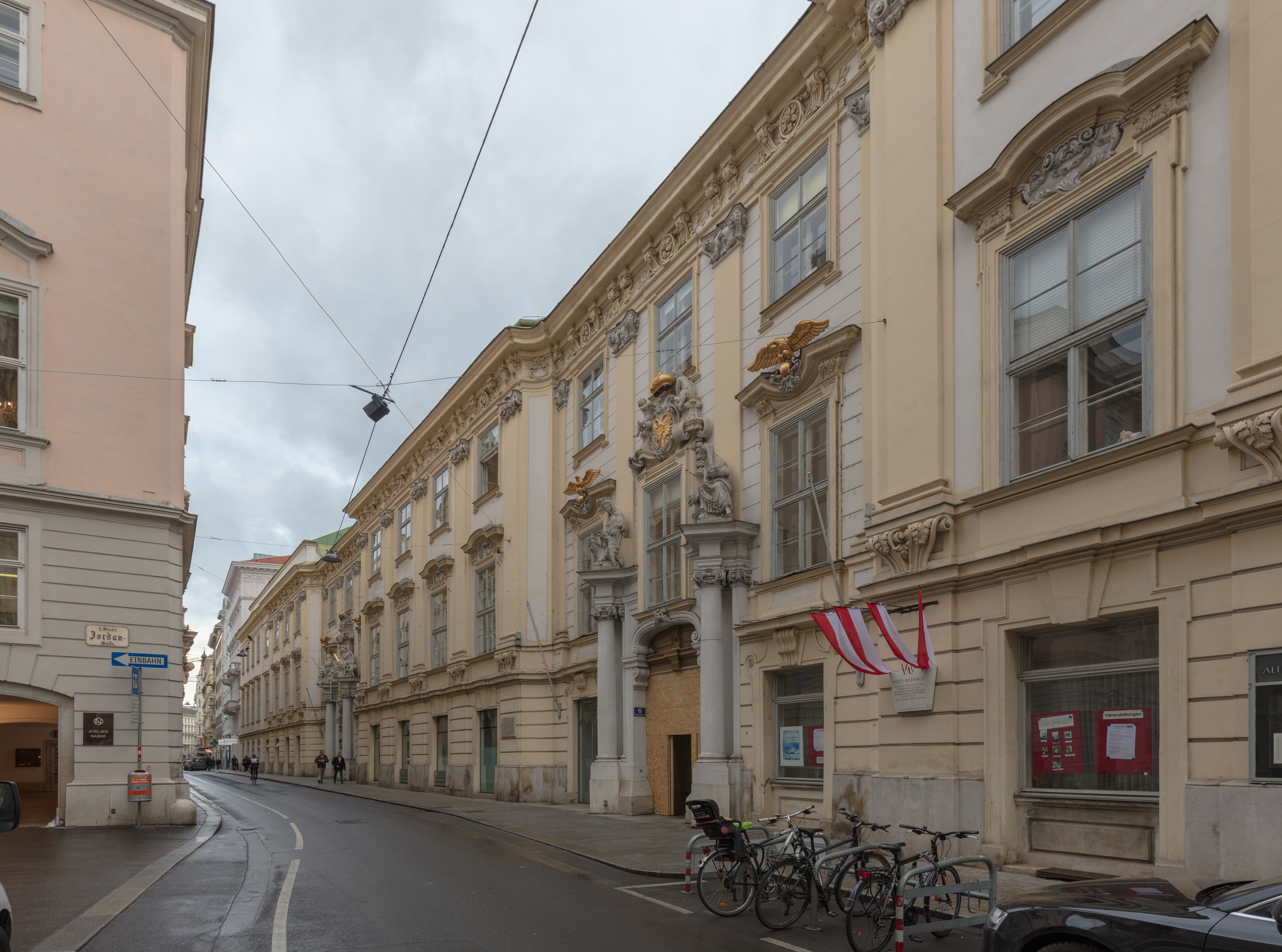
Altes Rathaus in Vienna, the first home of the Wiener Stadtbank (1706-1754)

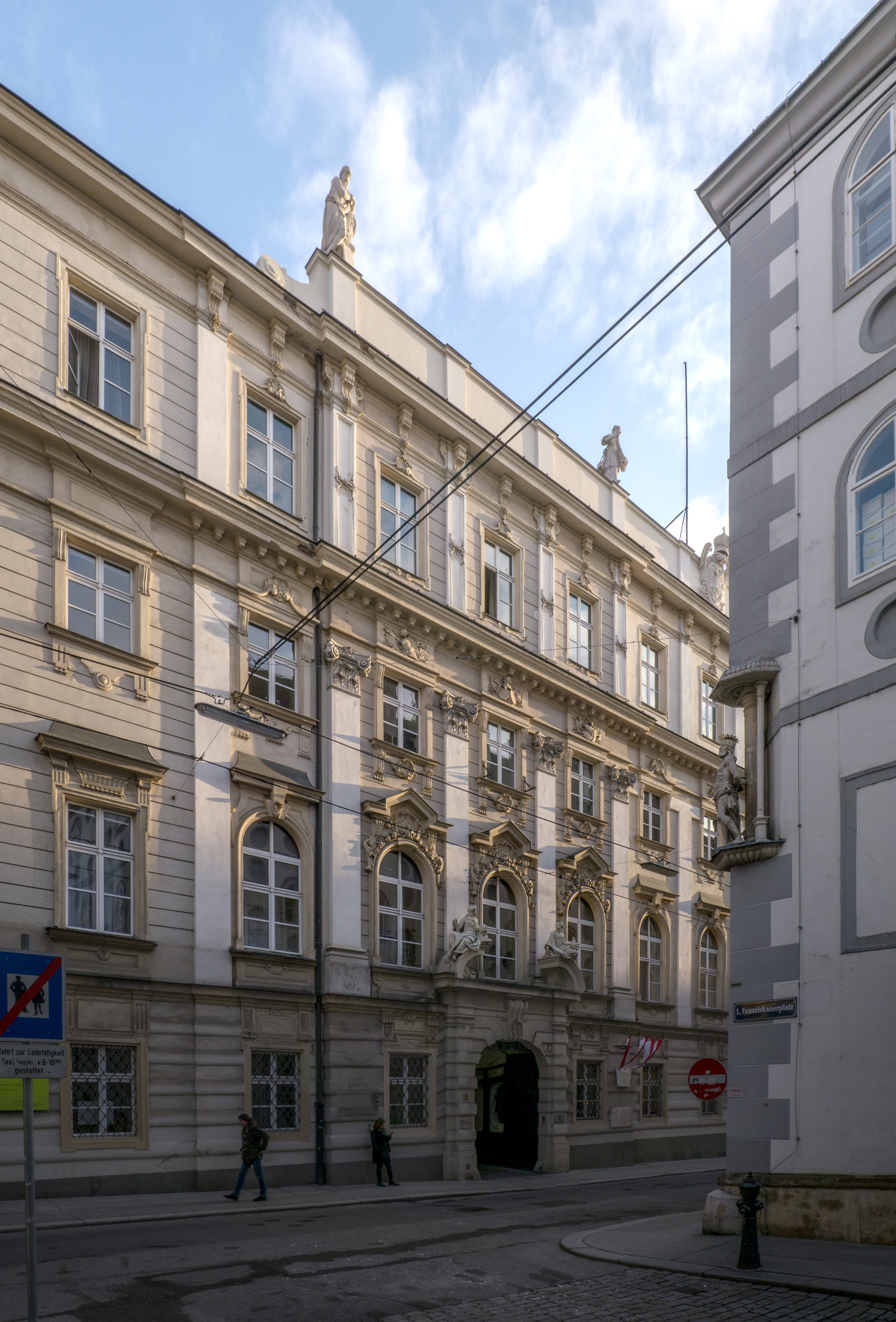
Palais Rottal, home of the Wiener Stadtbank from 1754 to 1811

The Wiener Stadtbank or Wiener Stadtbanco (lit. 'Municipal Bank of Vienna') was an Austrian municipal bank which in 1762 became the first note-issuing bank of the Habsburg monarchy. It was founded in 1706 by Emperor Charles VI, and closed in 1811 after having been bankrupted by the financial stress from the Napoleonic Wars.

== History ==
A first state-owned Vienna Banco del Giro was created in 1703, inspired by Italian precedents (such as Venice's Banco del Giro) and possibly also by the Bank of England established in the previous decade. In the context of Habsburg defeats in the War of the Spanish Succession, however, it failed to gain momentum, and the attempt was given up in 1705.

The Wiener Stadtbank started operations in 1706 on the basis of an Imperial patent letter of 24 December 1705, which pledged that it would be run "without any intervention from the Hofkammer" or Habsburg finance ministry. Whereas its main role from the start was to help finance the Habsburg state by increasing the liquidity of its debt, its control by the Viennese municipality allowed for a degree of day-to-day autonomy that acted as a disciplining device. It took over the accounts of the preceding Vienna banco del Giro.

It was originally located in Vienna's city hall now known as the Altes Rathaus. In 1754, it relocated to the Palais Rottal.

The bank's assets were mainly Habsburg government debt, while its reserves of precious metal were always limited. It financed itself by collecting deposits and issuing fixed term debt instruments. By the late 1750s, it had lost any pretence of independence from the Hofkammer. In 1762, during the Seven Years' War, it started printing notes which later became known as Bancozettel. By 1788, it was the fourth-largest in Europe by volume of notes issuance, after the Russian Assignation Bank, the Bank of England, and the French Caisse d'Escompte. In 1797, the convertibility of the bank's liabilities, which had been preserved until then despite precarious balance sheet strength, was eventually suspended and the Wiener Stadtbank's notes were given legal tender status.

The depreciation of the bank's notes eventually led to its closure in 1811, enacted with the bankruptcy declaration (German: Bankrottpatent) issued by Emperor Francis I on 20 February 1811. The banknotes formerly issued by the Wiener Stadtbank were exchanged against "redemption notes" at a rate of five to one, equivalent to a haircut of 80 percent, in effect a sovereign default that ruined many savers. Furthermore, the old notes were made invalid by 1 February 1812, before all could have been exchanged.

After a five-year interval, the Wiener Stadtbank was succeeded by the Austrian National Bank, founded in 1816.

== See also ==
- Hamburger Bank
- List of banks in Austria
