= Juan Manuel Abras =

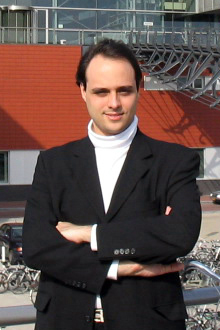
- Juan Manuel Abras in Amsterdam, 2006

Background information
- Born: Juan Manuel Abras Contel; February 1, 1975 (age 51); Stockholm, Sweden
- Genres: Classical music
- Occupations: Composer, conductor, musicologist, historian
- Years active: 1994–present
- Labels: GENUIN classics, Tradition-Naxos Japan, RMN Classical, Pretal, Harmonia Classica, etc.
- Website: www.janemanuelabras.com

Juan Manuel Abras Contel (in Swedish and Polish, Jan Emanuel Abras; born 1 February 1975) is a classical music composer, conductor, musicologist and historian from Sweden. Born in Stockholm to a European family (French, Italian, etc.) that moved around the world, Abras became a cosmopolitan artist and scientist.

== Background and education ==
Juan Manuel Abras was born in Stockholm, Sweden, spent his childhood in Geneva, Paris and Madrid, his adolescence in Venice, Buenos Aires, and Bilbao, and his youth in Vienna and Kraków. His education, which includes two PhD doctorates and a dozen of academic degrees, was received in Austria, Germany, Italy, Poland, Spain and Argentina while living with his parents, his father being a diplomat (an ambassador) and journalist, his mother being a sociologist and piano teacher). As composer, Abras was a student of Krzysztof Penderecki, Kurt Schwertsik and Roberto García Morillo, he also studied with Karlheinz Stockhausen, Helmut Lachenmann, Wolfgang Rihm, Alexander Müllenbach, etc. and attended the University of Music and Performing Arts Vienna, the Mozarteum University Salzburg, the Academy of Music in Kraków, the IRCAM of Paris, the Conservatorio di Musica Benedetto Marcello di Venezia, etc., taking part in courses, workshops and completing graduate and postgraduate studies. As conductor, Abras was a student of Leopold Hager, Ervin Acél, Guillermo Scarabino, etc., he also studied with Michael Gielen, Dominique Fanal, etc., and attended the University of Music and Performing Arts Vienna, the 'Manuel de Falla' Superior Conservatory of Music of Buenos Aires, the Berlin State Opera, etc. taking part in courses, internships and completing graduate and postgraduate studies. As musicologist and historian, Abras pursued a PhD Doctorate in Musicology (Complutense University of Madrid and University of Valladolid, a PhD Doctorate in Music (Pontifical Catholic University of Argentina) a Master in Spanish Music (University of Salamanca and University of Valladolid), a Licenciate and a Bachelor in History (USAL - Buenos Aires, first cycle completed at the University of Deusto) and numerous seminaries and courses. As pianist, Abras began his studies with his mother, he continued them with Giovanni Umberto Battel, Luis Fernando Barandiarán, Ana Litovsky-Grünwald, Elizabeth Fiocca, etc. and attended the Conservatorio di Musica Benedetto Marcello di Venezia, the Municipal Superior Conservatory of Music of San Sebastián, the Juan Crisóstomo Arriaga Conservatory of Bilbao, the Carlos López Buchardo National Conservatory of Music (now Universidad Nacional de las Artes), etc., completing his studies while also studying violin, clarinet, harpsichord and organ.

== Career and awards ==
Music criticism in France has pointed out that Juan Manuel Abras is one of the European composers who "represent a good portion of the Europe of the new music" and, at the same time, music criticism in Buenos Aires has considered him "a genuine representative of Argentine music". In Germany, Genuin classics has highlighted "the breathless intensity of Juan Manuel Abras" and within the French musicological field it has been stated that "variety is also found in his musical language", a language that contains "a unity, by nature inaudible, which is realised each time through the different styles", maintaining that in his works "there are, apart from the psychoanalysis [...] references to literature, religion, archaeology, etc.". The Spanish academic field has gathered that Abras' music is "cosmopolitan and multifaceted, in search of a balance between emotion and reason, a dialogue between past and future, tending towards the Absolute" and that "it contains influences from the composers with whom he studied, such as Penderecki, Stockhausen, Lachenmann and Rihm, equally nourishing from concepts such as anamnesis, union of the opposites, numinosity, ekphrasis and intertextuality". The inner unity in its deep structure manifests itself through varied surface structures and can use new technologies, contain references ranging from theology to biology and incorporate into classical music elements of folklore, as well as sounds produced by living beings". For example, according to musical criticism in Finland, during the Finnish premiere of his musical composition The song of Anna O., Abras "took the listener to a world of rhythmically pulsating fantasy, similar to a haunted castle". And, according to Polish musical criticism, in his musical piece Chacarera beatboxera, "Abras united in a whole elements taken from ethnic music, ancient popular melodies and New Music, creating a dancing whirlwind somewhat trance-like, full of sunny joy and amusement". In the United States, when referring to Abras, the press pointed out the "mastery of the composer [...] also as a skillful orchestrator" and in the cultural sphere of Buenos Aires it has been stated that "his encyclopedic culture has allowed him to articulate a cosmopolitan horizon".

Juan Manuel Abras has created a hundred musical compositions (for symphony/chamber orchestra/ensemble and/or choir with/without soloists, stage, solo instrument, electroacoustic sounds, etc.) (see below), which have been performed at a dozen international festivals: Gaudeamus Muziekweek (Netherlands), Festival MANCA (France), Warsaw Autumn International Festival of Contemporary Music (Poland), Musiikin aika - Time of Music (Finland), Ördögkatlan Fesztivál (Hungary), Piano City Milano (Italy), Festival Internacional Discantus (Mexico), International Festival of Krakow Composers (Poland), Le Printemps des Poètes (France), Foro Internacional de Música Nueva Manuel Enríquez (Mexico), Festival Dni Bachowskie (Poland), Festival Instrumenta (Mexico), etc. Those works have been performed at a hundred venues throughout the world: International Mozarteum Foundation (Austria), Teatro Colón (Argentina), Bimhuis-Muziekgebouw aan 't IJ (Netherlands), Filharmonia Łódzka im. Artura Rubinsteina (Poland), Kunstquartier Bethanien Berlin (Germany), Théâtre Dunois in Paris (France), Columbia University (United States), Balassi Institute (Belgium), St James's Church, Piccadilly (United Kingdom), Longoria Palace (Spain), International Research and Information Centre 'Thracica' (Bulgary), Nádasdy Ferenc Múzeum (Hungary), Conservatorio Luisa D'Annunzio (Italy), York University (Canada), Palacio de Bellas Artes (Mexico), Summart Arts Center (Turkey), University of Music and Performing Arts Vienna (Austria), Kirchner Cultural Centre (Argentina), Academy of Music in Krakow (Poland), Hellerau - Europäisches Zentrum der Künste Dresden (Germany), California State University (USA), Fundación Museo Jorge Oteiza (Spain), Associazione Cultura e Musica G. Curci (Italy), University of Ottawa (Canada), Museo Nacional de Arte (Mexico), Altes Rathaus Vienna (Austria), Museo Nacional de Bellas Artes (Argentina), National Museum Kraków (Poland), Kulturrathaus Dresden (Germany), University of Missouri (United States), Conservatorio Superior de Música de Navarra (Spain), Universidad Autónoma Benito Juárez de Oaxaca (Mexico), Palais Pálffy (Austria), etc. His current discography (see below) features works included in 11 CDs published in Germany, France, United Kingdom, Austria, Poland and Argentina.

Throughout his career, Juan Manuel Abras has won numerous awards and scholarships: TRINAC Prize 2017 (EIMC‐ISCM), TRINAC Mention 2014 (EIMC‐ISCM), Grafimuse Prize (Brussels, 2011), 2nd Wiener Filmmusikpreis (Vienna, 2010), Sibelius Chamber Orchestra Bicentenario Mention (Banfield, 2010), TRINAC Prize 2008 (EIMC-ISCM), Fundacja Argentynska Scholarship (Warsaw, 2006), Beca 'Directorio' del Fondo Nacional de las Artes (Buenos Aires, 2005), In Memoriam Erich Kleiber Scholarship (Berlin, 2004), Theodor Körner Prize (Vienna, 2003), 2nd Franz Josef Reinl-Stiftung Prize (Vienna, 2002), TRINAC 2002 and TRIMARG 2002 Mentions (both EIMC-ISCM-CAMU-IMC-UNESCO), CSMMF Gold Medal Award both in musical composition and orchestral conducting (Buenos Aires, 2000), etc.

== Professional and teaching positions ==
Juan Manuel Abras has worked as composer in residence, as well as guest composer and commissioned composer, within the frame of activities held by: 51. Warsaw Autumn International Festival of Contemporary Music (2008), Ensemble Aleph - 4th International Forum for Young Composers (Program 'Culture 2000' of the European Union; Paris, 2006), Fundacja Argentynska (Warsaw, 2006), XIII Laboratory of Contemporary Music (Warsaw, 2006), International Forum for Culture and Business (Dresden, 2003), etc. A member of the Austrian Composers' Society (ÖKB), Spanish Musicology Society (SEdeM), Musimagen and SADAIC, Abras has been appointed chief conductor, assistant conductor and artistic director of several Argentine orchestras (including the Ibero-American Chamber Orchestra of the National Academy of Fine Arts and the House [Symphony] Orchestra of the Tucumán Province), participating in the dissemination of Argentine music and Ibero-American music as composer, conductor, pianist and concert series organizer, also working as arranger, orchestrator, music engraver, score preparator and music copyist. In Argentina, Juan Manuel Abras also worked as Professor at the National University of Lanús in the Buenos Aires Province (teaching Musical techniques and Chamber music of the 20th century), as Professor at the Astor Piazzolla Superior Conservatory of Music of the City of Buenos Aires (teaching Musical analysis, Musical stylistics and Instrumental practice) and as Invited Member (researcher) at the Carlos Vega Institute of Musicological Research-UCA (transcribing and researching Latin-American manuscripts of Renaissance music and Baroque music).

== Selected compositions ==
- A letter for Mich (2011), for solo clarinet in Bb
- Along the European Silk Road—from Berlin to Warsaw (2022), for orchestra
- American birds (2020), for brass quintet
- American birds (2020), for reed quintet
- Ania jest... (2015), for solo clarinet in Bb. World premiere: 22 September 2016, barStudio of the Teatr Studio im. Stanisława Ignacego Witkiewicza – Palace of Culture and Science, Warsaw (Poland). 59th International Festival of Contemporary Music Warsaw Autumn. Michał Górczyński, clarinet
- Actus contritionis (2006), for speaker, mixed choir, chamber ensemble and electronics (Work awarded the TRINAC Prize, EIMC-ISCM, 2008. World premiere: January 13, 2007. Sala Kameralna, Academy of Music in Kraków, Kraków, Poland. Grzegorz Brajner, conducting / Wojciech Leonowicz, narrator / Chór Kameralny Muzyki Współczesnej / Wiktoria Chrobak, percussion / Piotr Grodecki, double bass / Michał Pawełek, piano). Published with Universal Edition (UES101913-000)
- Argentine speeches (2011), for solo oboe. World Premiere: 24 June 2015, Circolo Italiano, Buenos Aires (Argentina). Marcelo Baus, oboe
- Argentine Suite (2001), for orchestra (Work awarded the Franz Josef Reinl-Stiftung 2nd Prize, Vienna, 2002). World premiere: June 7, 2002. 'Fanny-Hensel-Mendelssohn' Saal, University of Music and Performing Arts Vienna, Austria. Werner Hackl, conducting / Tonkünstler Ensemble
- Argentine Suite (2001), for ensemble (Work awarded the Franz Josef Reinl-Stiftung 2nd Prize, Vienna, 2002). World premiere: June 7, 2002. 'Fanny-Hensel-Mendelssohn' Saal, University of Music and Performing Arts Vienna, Austria. Werner Hackl, conducting / Tonkünstler Ensemble
- Astor in Astorga (2017), for violin and accordion. World premiere: 18 May 2017, Guelbenzu Auditorium of the Higher Conservatory of Music of Navarre, Pamplona (Spain). Piazzolleando: Astor in memoriam Series. Irati Sanz, violin; Itsaso Mungia, accordion. World premiere recording: Various artists (Irati Sanz, violin; Itsaso Mungia, accordion). In Focus 2. RMN Classical CLS200501, 2020, compact disc (United Kingdom). Published with Universal Edition (UES101000-000)
- Austrian speeches (2011), for solo oboe
- Bandoneon concerto “Sedekte” (2001), for solo bandoneon and string orchestra. Work awarded the TRINAC Mention 2002 (EIMC-ISCM-CAMU-IMC-UNESCO) (version for solo bandoneon and string quartet)
- Bandoneon concerto “Sedekte” (2001), for solo bandoneon and string quartet. Work awarded the TRINAC Mention 2002 (EIMC-ISCM-CAMU-IMC-UNESCO)
- Blutgletscherstück (2013), for chamber ensemble
- Chacarera beatboxera (2008), for human beatboxer, clarinet, percussion, piano and violin (Work commissioned by 51. Warsaw Autumn International Festival of Contemporary Music, Poland. World premiere: September 25, 2008. Ochota Sports Centre, Warsaw, Poland. Patryk 'TikTak' Matela, beatboxing / Kwartludium Ensemble. World premiere recording: CD Sound Chronicle of the Warsaw Autumn 2008 No. 5 (2008), Polish Music Information Centre, Polmic 045, Warsaw, Poland. Patryk 'TikTak' Matela, human beatboxing / Kwartludium Ensemble)
- Chacarera meets the Puna (2005), for solo violin. World premiere: 20 September 2013, Áron Szilády Reformed High School, Kiskunhalas (Hungary). High School Evenings. Édua Zádory, violin. Published with Universal Edition (UES101378-110)
- Dante’s quartet (2021), for string quartet
- Debussyan chacarera (2010), for solo piano. World premiere: 16 May 2011, Arévalo Auditorium of the Professional Council of Economic Sciences of the Autonomous City of Buenos Aires, Buenos Aires (Argentina). Young Talents Series. Natalia González Figueroa, piano. World premiere recording: Natalia González Figueroa. Homeland, 2018, compact disc (Argentina). Published with Universal Edition (UES100776-410)
- De coelesti hierarchia (2002), for male choir, chamber ensemble and electronics
- De profundis (2008), for mixed choir and chamber ensemble
- Dialogues (2004), for flute, clarinet in Bb, violin and cello
- Dialogues (2004), for string quartet
- Dream and chacarera (2001), for flute and clarinet in Bb. World premiere: 8 August 2001, National Radio Auditorium, Buenos Aires (Argentina). Javier Blanco, flute; Alfredo Gómez, clarinet. Work awarded the TRIMARG Mention 2002 (EIMC-ISCM-CAMU-IMC-UNESCO)
- Drunken Fugue (1999), for saxophone trio. World premiere: 5 July 2002, Juan Bautista Alberdi Hall of the General San Martín Cultural Centre, Buenos Aires (Argentina). Carolina Cervetto, soprano saxophone; Diana Magalí Carballo, tenor saxophone; Sabina Egea Sobral, bariton saxophone
- Euskal oroipenak (2018), for txistu with tamboril, accordion and marimba. World Premiere: 4 June 2018, Fernando Remacha Auditorium of the Higher Conservatory of Music of Navarre, Pamplona (Spain). People’s Roots. Ainara Martínez, txistu; Isaac Irimia, marimba; Itsaso Mungia, accordion
- Euskal oroipenak (2018), for piccolo, accordion, marimba and snare drum. World Premiere: 4 June 2018, Fernando Remacha Auditorium of the Higher Conservatory of Music of Navarre, Pamplona (Spain). People’s Roots. Ainara Martínez, txistu; Isaac Irimia, marimba; Itsaso Mungia, accordion (version for txistu with tamboril, accordion and marimba)
- Five rivers (2019), for orchestra. Published with Universal Edition (UES102561-000)
- Franciscan(onic) dialogues (2012), for bass flute and electronics
- Franciscan(onic) dialogues (2012), for flute and electronics
- Harmonie – Alpha et Omega (2001), for soprano and piano (World premiere: April 25, 2002. 'Beethoven' Saal, Palais Pálffy, Vienna, Austria. Marika Ottisch, soprano / Laurenço César, piano. World premiere recording: CD Harmonie heute?! (2002), Harmonia Classica Records, HCR 022, Vienna, Austria. Marika Ottisch, soprano / Lourenço César Finatti, piano)
- Harmonie—Alpha et Omega (2002), for tenor and piano. Music Text: Otto Vicenzi. World premiere: 25 April 2002, Figaro Hall of the Palais Pálffy, Viena (Austria). Jubilee and Prize Winners’ Concert of Harmonia Classica. Marika Ottitsch, voice; Lourenço César Finatti, piano (version for soprano and piano). World premiere recording: Various artists (Marika Ottitsch, voice; Lourenço César Finatti, piano). Harmonie heute?! Harmonia Classica Records HCR 022, 2002, compact disc (Austria) (version for soprano and piano). Work selected for the Jubilee and Prize Winners’ Concert of Harmonia Classica (version for soprano and piano)
- Huayno meets the Milonga (2009), for vibraphone and marimba (World premiere: June 10, 2011. Legislatura de la Ciudad Autónoma de Buenos Aires, Argentina. Gonzalo Pérez, vibraphone / Martín Diez, marimba)
- Innandöme (2020), for orchestra (2020)
- Innandöme II (2020), for chamber ensemble
- In utero (2022), for accordion and percussion
- Jubarte à Jakarta (2015), for solo cello
- Jubarte à Jakarta (2015), for solo viola
- Kinderlachen (2015), for soprano recorder. World premiere: 18 September 2016, Kunstquartier Bethanien, Berlin (Germany). Fat Cat Concerts Series. Sylvia Hinz, recorder
- Kinderlachen (2015), for tenor recorder. World premiere: 18 September 2016, Kunstquartier Bethanien, Berlin (Germany). Fat Cat Concerts Series. Sylvia Hinz, recorder (version for soprano recorder)
- La Chacayalera (1999), for children's choir
- Libertas? (1999), for instrument(s) and/or voice(s) (Work awarded the Grafimuse Prize, Brussels, 2011. World premiere: June 22, 2011. Arte Gallery, Sofia, Bulgaria. Performed by music students from the New Bulgarian University)
- Milonga meets Malambo (2011), for violoncello and piano (World premiere: June 18, 2012. Sala 'Manuel M. Ponce', Palacio de Bellas Artes, Mexico City, Mexico. Juan Hermida, violoncello / Misa Ito, piano)
- Moment musical sur un thème de Hill (2012), for soprano and chamber ensemble (World premiere: June 4, 2013. Théâtre Dunois, Paris, France. Ensemble Aleph)
- Many faces, one mother (2006), for solo voices, choir and chamber orchestra (Work commissioned by Fundacja Argentyńska, Warsaw, Poland. World premiere: May 7, 2006. Parafia p.w. Ofiarowania Pańskiego w Warszawie, Warsaw, Poland. Adriana Róża Szmyt, conducting / Barbara Wnuk, soprano / Bożenna Jurkiewicz, alto / Piotr Szmyt, tenor / Ryszard Morka, bass / Chór 'Cantate Domino' / Zuzanna Sawicka, harp / Natolińska Orkiestra Kameralna)
- Memories of the 11M (2007), for solo piano
- Milonga meets malambo (2011), for violin and piano. World premiere: 18 June 2012, Manuel M. Ponce Hall of the Palace of Fine Arts, Mexico City (Mexico). 34th Manuel Enríquez International Forum of New Music (FIMNME). Trío de las Américas (Misa Ito, piano; Juan Hermida, violoncello) (version for violoncello and piano). Work selected by the 34th Manuel Enríquez International Forum of New Music (Mexico)
- Miserere (2008), for mixed choir a cappella
- Musik für Nina (2010) for chamber ensemble. World premiere: 14 September 2010, mdw – University of Music and Performing Arts Vienna. International Film Music Symposium Vienna 2010. Screening of the film sequence. Work awarded the 2nd Wiener Filmmusikpreis (Vienna Film music Prize) 2010
- Musique pour un soldat de plomb (1999), for string orchestra. Work awarded the Special Mention 2010 at the Sibelius Chamber Orchestra Composition Contest (Argentina)
- Musique pour un soldat de plomb (1999), for string quartet. Work awarded the Special Mention 2010 at the Sibelius Chamber Orchestra Composition Contest (Argentina) (version for string orchestra)
- Nature’s bleeding wounds of war (2020), for soundtrack
- Nights to forget (2002), chamber opera in one act
- Only one note (2014), for solo piano. World premiere: 24 June 2014, Theatre Hall of the University of Bremen, Bremen (Germany). One-Note Music. Juan María Solare, piano. Work selected in the One-Note Music International Call for Works (Germany)
- Perpetuum tanguile (2013), for solo violin. World premiere: 26 July 2014, Brick-5 Society for the Promotion of Multimedia Art and Technology, Vienna (Austria). Sound in the Image (Klang im Bild). Édua Zádory, violin World premiere recording: Édua Zádory. Heavy. GENUIN classics GEN 17473, 2017, compact disc (Germany). CD included in the Naxos Music Library (Japan). Published with Universal Edition (UES100631-110)
- Piano concerto “Telesiadas”: Variations on a theme by Chazarreta (2009), for solo piano and orchestra. Work awarded the TRINAC Prize 2017 (EIMC-ISCM)
- Ploratus acerbos infantem edere (2013), for solo clarinet in Bb. World premiere: 20 August 2014, National University Institute of Art, Buenos Aires (Argentina). Griselda Giannini, clarinet
- Polish speeches (2011), for solo oboe. World premiere: 22 June 2016, Circolo Italiano, Buenos Aires (Argentina). Andrés Spiller, oboe
- Pomeranian rhapsody (2017), for oboe d’amore and harpsichord. World premiere: 14 October 2017, Bishop Erazm Ciołek Palace, Kraków (Poland). Between Bach and Abras (Między Bachem a Abrasem). Il Vento Ensemble (Katarzyna Pilipiuk, oboe d’amore; Anna Huszczo, harpsichord). World premiere recording: Various artists (Il Vento Ensemble). In Focus 5. RMN Classical CLS210901, 2021, compact disc (United Kingdom). Published with Universal Edition (UES102098-000)
- Pentecostés (Veni Sancte Spiritus) (2007), for choir and electroacoustic sounds(World premiere: May 26, 2007. Sala Koncertowa, Academy of Music in Kraków, Kraków, Poland. Grzegorz Brajner, conducting / Chór Kameralny 'Pogratulujmy Mrówkom')
- Ricercare (1999), for flute, clarinet in Bb, violin and cello. World premiere: 19 June 1999, Vienna Hall of the International Mozarteum Foundation, Salzburg (Austria). Yun-Hwa Song, flute; Víctor Estarelles, clarinet; Samuli Tuomikoski, violin; Pejman Memarzadeh, violoncello
- Ricercare (1999), for string quartet (1999). World premiere: 19 June 1999, Vienna Hall of the International Mozarteum Foundation, Salzburg (Austria). Yun-Hwa Song, flute; Víctor Estarelles, clarinet; Samuli Tuomikoski, violin; Pejman Memarzadeh, violoncello (version for flute, clarinet, violin and violoncello)
- Scriabinian bossa nova (2014), for solo cello (2014)
- Scriabinian bossa nova (2014), for solo viola
- Sitwa Raymi (2014), for mixed choir, chamber ensemble and electronics. World premiere: 14 June 2015, St. Charles Borromeo’s Basilica, Buenos Aires (Argentina). 20th Series of the Don Bosco Concerts. Ensamble Vocal Cámara XXI; Miguel Ángel Pesce, conductor World premiere recording: Ensamble Vocal Cámara XXI; Miguel Ángel Pesce, conductor. Bavel. 2016, compact disc (Argentina). Published with Universal Edition (UES101928-000)
- The hermit (2015), for solo violin and dancer ad lib. World premiere: 9 March 2016, Ferenc Nádasdy Museum, Sárvár (Hungary). Violin and Dance. Duo Zádory—Simkó (Édua Zádory, violin; Beatrix Simkó, dance). World premiere recording: Édua Zádory. Heavy. GENUIN classics GEN 17473, 2017, compact disc (Germany). (Shortened version). CD included in the Naxos Music Library (Japan). Published with Universal Edition (UES103252-110)
- The Dante sketches (2007), for speaker, mixed choir and orchestra
- Un requiem lorquiano (2009), for soundtrack. World premiere: 4 January 2014, Sala Curci, Barletta (Italy). Concert of Electroacoustic Music. Nicola Monopoli, sound director

World premiere recording: Various artists (Nicola Monopoli, sound director). Electroacoustic & Beyond Vol. 2. RMN Classical CLS170901, 2017, compact disc (United Kingdom) Work selected in the Soundiff-Diffrazioni Sonore International Call for Works (Italy)

- The song of Anna O. (2005), for mezzo-soprano and chamber ensemble. World premiere: 6 September 2006, Bimhuis — Muziekgebouw aan 't IJ, Amsterdam (Netherlands). Gaudeamus Music Week. Ensemble Aleph (Monica Jordan, voice and tam-tam; Dominique Clément, clarinet; Lutz Mandler, trumpet, didgeridoo and train whistle; Jean-Charles François, marimba; Sylvie Drouin, piano; Noëmi Schindler, violin; Christophe Roy, violoncello). World premiere recording: Ensemble Aleph. 4e Forum International des Jeunes Compositeurs, 2006, compact disc (France). Work selected by the Ensemble Aleph (France) for the 4th International Forum for Young Composers (Culture 2000 programme of the European Commission). Published with Universal Edition (UES102015-000)
- Toccata argentina (2020), for solo organ. World premiere (scheduled): 22 October 2022, National Auditory of the Kirchner Cultural Centre (Auditorio Nacional del Centro Cultural Kirchner), Buenos Aires (Argentina). The Night of Museums (La Noche de los Museos). Luis Caparra, organ. Published with Universal Edition (UES103310-420)
- Veni Sancte Spiritus (2007), for mixed choir and electronics. World premiere: 26 May 2007, Concert Hall of the Academy of Music in Kraków (Poland). 19th Days of Music of Kraków Composers (19. Dni Muzyki Kompozytorów Krakowskich). Chór Kameralny “Pogratulujmy Mrówkom”; Grzegorz Brajner
- Wagnerian cueca (2015), for solo cello (2015)
- Wagnerian cueca (2015), for solo viola (2015)

== Discography (selection) ==
- 2002: 'Harmonie Alpha et Omega' (Text by Otto Vicenzi). Harmonie heute?! Marika Ottisch, Soprano / Lourenço César Finatti, Piano. Harmonia Classica Records, HCR 022 (Vienna, Austria)
- 2006: 'The Song of Anna O.'. 4e Forum International des Jeunes Compositeurs - Oeuvres sélectionnées. Work selected by the Ensemble Aleph - 4th International Forum for Young Composers (Program 'Culture 2000' of the European Union). Ensemble Aleph. Ensemble Aleph-Cdmc (Paris, France)
- 2008: 'Chacarera beatboxera'. Sound Chronicle of the Warsaw Autumn 2008 No. 5. Work commissioned by 51. International Festival of Contemporary Music 'Warsaw Autumn.' Patryk 'TikTak' Matela, human beatboxing / Kwartludium Ensemble. Polish Music Information Centre, POLMIC 045 (Warsaw, Poland)
- 2016: 'Sitwa Raymi'. Bavel - Obras Corales Contemporáneas. Ensamble Cámara XXI / Miguel Pesce (Buenos Aires, Argentina)
- 2017: 'Un requiem lorquiano'. Electroacoustic & Beyond Vol. 2. Jan Emanuel Abras, soundtrack. RMN Classical, CLS170901 (London, United Kingdom)
- 2017: 'Perpetuum tanguile' and 'The Hermit' (revised version). Heavy. Édua Zádory, violin. GENUIN classics, GEN17473 (Leipzig, Germany)
- 2018: 'Chacarera endebussyada'. Homeland. Natalia González Figueroa, piano. (Buenos Aires, Argentina)
- 2020: 'Astor in Astorga'. In Focus 2. Irati Sanz, violin / Itsaso Mungia, accordion. RMN Classical, CLS200501 (London, United Kingdom)
- 2021: 'Pomeranian rhapsody'. In Focus 5. Il Vento Ensemble. RMN Classical, CLS210901 (London, United Kingdom)
