= Ferdinand Fellner the Elder =

Austrian architect (1815–1871)

Ferdinand Fellner (15 March 1815 – 25 September 1871) was an Austrian architect. He was born and died in Vienna.

== Life ==
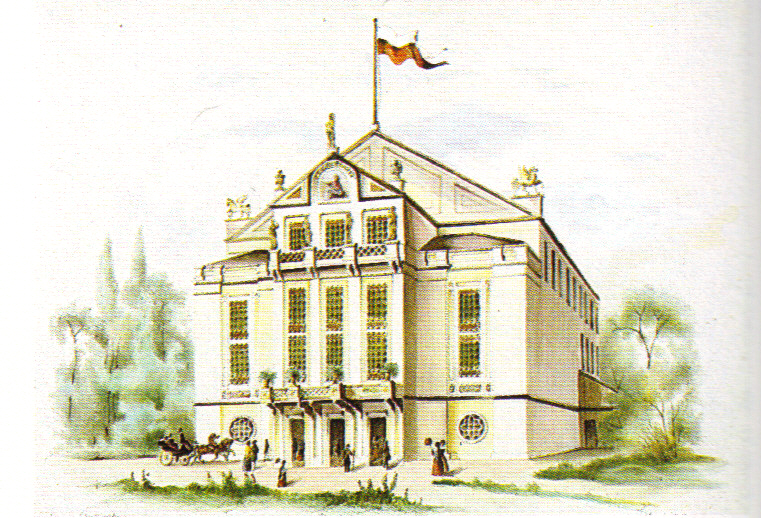
Thaliatheater (1856)

== Works ==
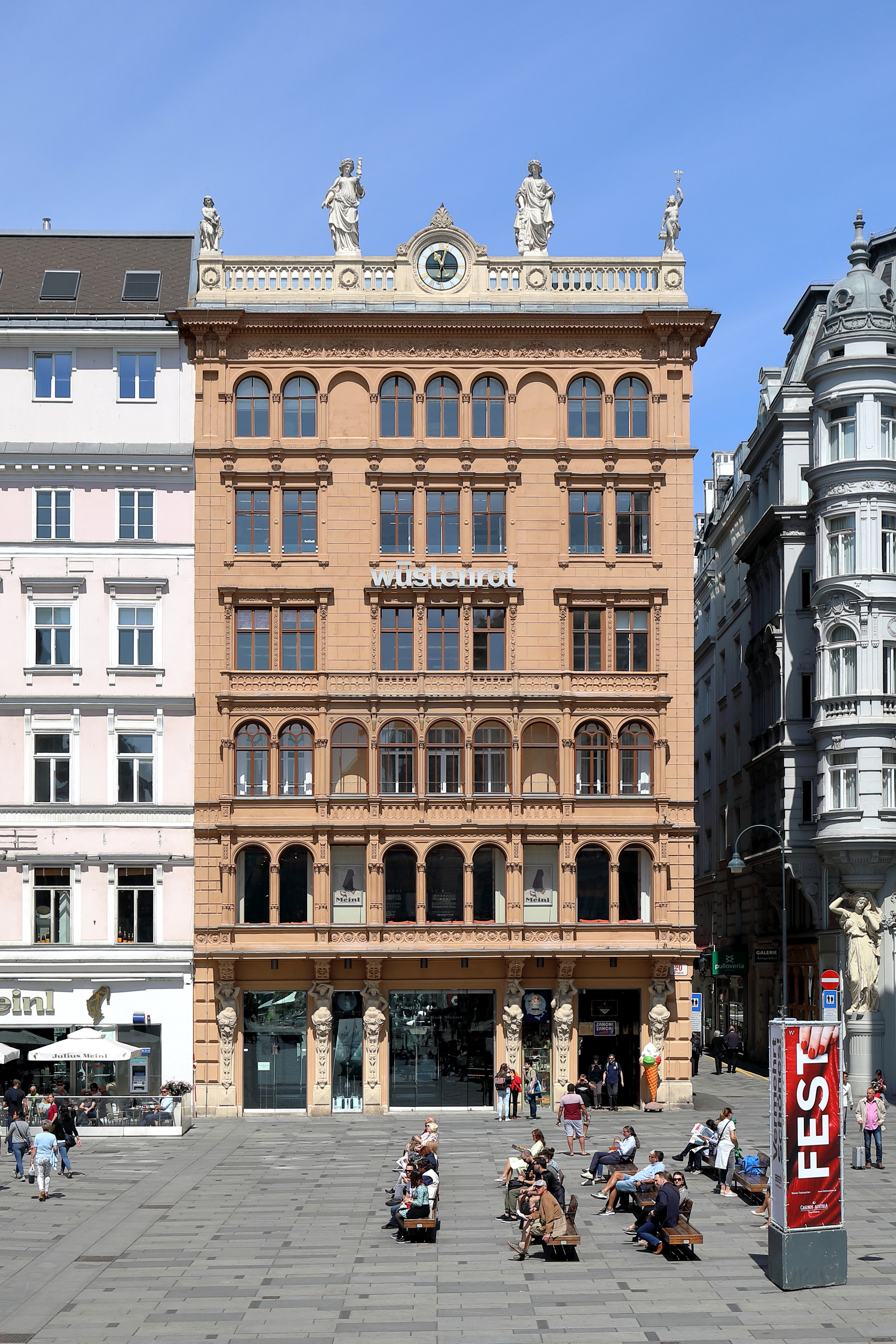
Wohnhaus am Graben (1855–1858)

== Bibliography ==
- https://de.wikisource.org/wiki/BLK%C3%96:Fellner,_Ferdinand
- "Fellner, Ferdinand (d. Ä.)". In: Österreichisches Biographisches Lexikon 1815–1950 (ÖBL). Vol. 1, Austrian Academy of Sciences, Vienna 1957, p. 297.
- Felix Czeike: Historisches Lexikon Wien Bd. 2. Kremayr & Scheriau: Wien 1993
