= Point of No Return (ballet) =

Point of No Return [5' 00"] is a "ballet for tape (stereo)" composed by Juan Maria Solare. It was designed in Worpswede from January 24, 2002 to January 28, 2002, with details released on March 14, 2002, and made in Cologne at the composer's studio from September 29 to October 5, 2005. Its first performance was on April 13, 2003 at the Akademie für Tonkunst in Darmstadt, Germany, in the frame of the concert "Begegnung mit Lateinamerika - Elektroakustische Musik" ("Encounter with Latin America - electroacoustic music" in German), on the 57th day of the Institut für neue Musik und Musikerziehung (Institut for New Music and Music Education). It was a mixer in 8-canals by the composer.

It was broadcast on Radiofabrik in Salzburg on June 13, 2004 in the program "Lyrik und Musik aus Lateinamerika" produced by Luis Alfredo Duarte Herrera. It was also broadcast by the WDR in June 2005 during a program on electroacoustic music of Latin America prepared by Torsten Eßer. It premiered in Argentina during a concert by "Imaginario Sur" of the Instituto Universitario Nacional de las Artes on August 18, 2004 at the La Manufactura Papelera, Buenos Aires. It won the first prize at the 2nd "Concurso Promociones Electroacústicas" organized by the Federación Argentina de Música Electroacústica (Regional Buenos Aires) together with the Conservatorio Nacional and the Instituto Tecnológico ORT in September 2005. It was also performed at the Conservatorio Nacional in Buenos Aires on October 7, 2005, in Santa Fe, Argentina in November 2005 within the frame of the 20th Reunión de Música Electroacústica and on December 12, 2002 at the Hochschule für Musik Köln in Cologne, in the cycle Aula Konzerte.
