= Malena (song) =

1942 song composed by Lucio Demare and Homero Manzi

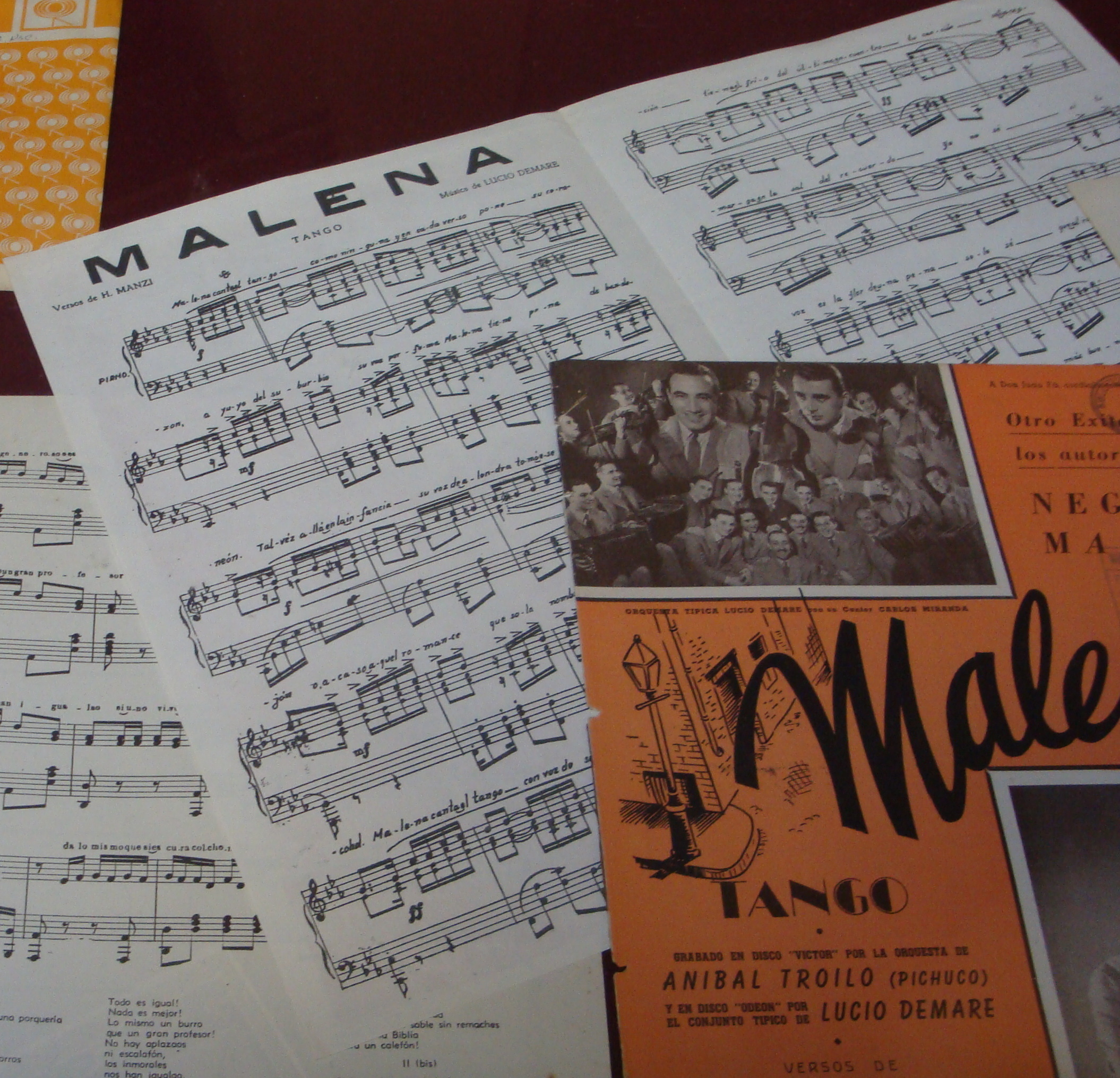

Malena is a famous tango song from 1941 whose lyrics were written by Homero Manzi and music composed by Lucio Demare. It was performed for the first time by Lucio Demare’s orchestra in the Boite Novelty, sung by Juan Carlos Miranda. This version was recorded in the movie El Viejo Hucha, directed by Lucas Demare and with Osvaldo Miranda who did the cinematography. The movie was released on January 8, 1942, and April 29, 1942. This version was successfully recorded at RCA Victor by the Anibal Troilo orchestra, with the voice of Francisco Fiorentino. It has been considered one of the most beautiful tangos of all time.

== The lyrics ==
The lyrics were written by Homero Manzi which is split into two parts that are separated by a chorus. The separation refers to Malena’s passionate way of singing tango. Manzi is impressed by the “dark tone” of Malena’s song, her “shadow voice”, her “shaky voice” and that leads her to sing “tango like no other”. Manzi believes Malena identifies herself in such a way with tango that it attributes to the quintessential tango essence and he states, “Malena’s sorrow is that of a bandoneon”.

In the chorus, the songwriter addresses Malena directly, to tell her what it feels like to hear her sing. He then tells her how he is moved by the cold and bitter emotion while she sings as if it were made “in the salt of remembrance”, and confessing at last in front of someone capable of exposing her pain in this way. He can only feel her kindness, “You are better, much better than me”.

With “Malena”, Homero Manzi introduced the metaphor of tango, influencing other lyricists such as Homero Expósito and Catulo Castillo. Manzi, in turn, was influenced by French surrealism, and poets such as Pablo Neruda and Federico Garcia Lorca.

== The music ==
Lucio Demare has said that:

“I produced the music of “Malena” in no more than 15 minutes. Manzi had given me the verses 10 days ago. I thought: “Manzi is coming tonight and at least I am going to tell him how to start the tango”. Then I sat in the cafe and I wrote it all at once, unpolished and without changing anything. It was in the summer of 1942, in The Great Guindado, a bar of Acevedo and Libertador, located in front of the Zoo, that they had already broke it down.

However, the melodic line of “Malena” refers to “Chorus No.1 for the Guitar”, by the Brazilian composer Heitor Villa-Lobos, which was written in 1920. Additionally, an Argentinian singer, who lives in Brazil, is mentioned as the possible main character of the tango, who Manzi met during a trip.

Despite this, Malena was one of the tangos that gave rise to the mythical “decade of the 40s” of tango and the “prodigious decade” of this Rioplatense style. Lucio Demare, along with Juan D’Arienzo and Carlos Di Sarli were the musicians who since the late 1930s, developed the new tango musicality, oriented to dance and milonga, that characterized the 1940s.

== Related circumstances ==
=== Who was Malena? ===
Historians argue about who Malena was. The direct inspiration seems to have been Malena de Toledo, the artistic name of Elena Torolero. Manzi would have heard her sing in 1941, in Brazil, probably in São Paulo, although there are testimonies that say it was in Porto Alegre. Malena de Toledo was a singer born probably in Chile or in the Province of Santa Fe in 1916, and died on January 23, 1950, in Montevideo. Apparently, she spent her childhood in Porto Alegre and lived in Sao Paulo, Venezuela, and Buenos Aires. In Buenos Aires, her address was 746 Maipu Street, Apartment A, on the ground floor, between Cordoba and Viamonte. She was married to Genaro Salinas, a well-known Mexican bolero singer, with whom she had two children, Concepcion and Genaro. In 1959, she met with Lucio Demare, in the “Le Mans” room. Her grave is in the Pantheon of Artists, in the Chacarita Cemetery in Bueno Aires. The historian Benedetti refers in his book, “The Best Tango Lyrics”, which contains a legend that he compiled, “Malena de Toledo had this tango in her repertoire without suspecting that was named for her, and that when it was pointed out to her she was so impressed that she stopped singing forever”.

However, various scholars have also argued that Malena de Toledo may have been the direct inspiration and especially the name of the song, but not the person to whom Manzi wrote. Along those lines, it has been said that Malena was Nelly Omar, with whom the poet had a loving relationship, a version that the singer herself supports.

Nelly Omar stated,

"Yes, Manzi wrote it to me in Mexico. He sent the letter to Demare, Demare put it in his pocket and forgot it. When Manzi came he demanded: “What did you do with the letter I sent you?”. And there they did the tango.

It was common for Homero Manzi to dedicate tango lyrics to Nelly Omar, and some examples are: “Only Her”, “None”, and “Her letter did not arrive”.

Also, it is said that it was actually about Azucena Maizani, something that she always denied. Various witnesses of the time have also supported other versions, such as that of a singer from a La Boca cantina, a dressmaker who was fond of singing.

=== Uses of the name linked to Malena (tango) ===
Due to a series of coincidences related to the tango Malena, SADAIC established March 6 as “Malena's Day”.

Lucio Demare installed a tango club called Malena of the South, in Balcarce 860, San Telmo neighborhood, which operated between 1969 and 1977, three years after his death.
