= Juan María Solare =

Argentine composer and pianist

- Also known as: DonSolare
- Born: August 11, 1966 (age 59); Buenos Aires, Argentina
- Genres: Classical, tango, electroacoustic music, fluxus
- Occupations: Composer, Pianist, Conductor
- Instrument: piano
- Years active: 1986–present
- Labels: Janus Music & Sound
- Website: http://www.JuanMariaSolare.com

Juan María Solare (born August 11, 1966) is an Argentine composer and pianist.

== Education ==
Born in Buenos Aires, Argentina, Solare studied and received his diploma in piano (María Teresa Criscuolo), composition (Fermina Casanova, Juan Carlos Zorzi) and conducting (Mario Benzecry) at the Conservatorio Nacional de Música Carlos López Buchardo. He also studied privately with Francisco Kröpfl.

Between 1993 and 1996 he undertook postgraduate studies on Composition at the Musikhochschule in Cologne (Germany) under the guidance of Johannes Fritsch, Clarence Barlow, and Mauricio Kagel, in the frame of a scholarship of the German Academic Exchange Service (DAAD). Between October 1997 and February 1999, he did postgraduate studies with Helmut Lachenmann in Stuttgart. (Between July 1998 and June 1999 he held a scholarship from the Heinrich-Strobel Foundation (Baden-Baden).) Between 1999 and 2001 studied electronic music with Hans Ulrich Humpert in Cologne, with diploma. From June 2001 until May 2002 he was composer in residence at the Art colony Worpswede, Germany.

In April 2005 he obtained the title "Licenciado en Composición" (Master's degree) from the Instituto Universitario Nacional del Arte (IUNA) in Buenos Aires. Since 1993 he has regularly attended and participated in seminars given by Karlheinz Stockhausen. He passed the Konzertexamen (master) in electroacoustic composition at the Musikhochschule in Cologne on 5 December 2007. Currently he is working on a PhD in music education at the Universidad Complutense de Madrid.

== Teaching positions ==
From 1986 until 1993 he taught harmony, morphology, and chamber music at the Conservatory of Tandil (Argentina). Since January 2002 he has given piano lessons at the Musikschule Bremen (Germany). Since October 2002 he has conducted the Orquesta No Típica, a chamber music group devoted to tango at the University of Bremen. Since October 2004 he has taught piano at the Hochschule für Künste Bremen. From December 2007 to April 2008 he was assistant professor at the Universidad Complutense de Madrid. Since 2008 he has taught New Music Theatre at the University of Bremen, where he conducts the Ensemble Kagel.

He has given courses and lectures on contemporary music at the Institut für neue Musik und Musikerziehung (Darmstadt), the Salzburg Experimental Academy of Dance (SEAD), the Ateneo de Madrid, the Université permanente (Nantes, France), and the Texas A&M University (College Station, Texas).

In addition, he teaches piano and composition privately, and has presented public seminars on tango music.

Since August 2013 Solare conducts the chamber orchestra of the Bremer Orchestergemeinschaft.

== Compositions ==
Solare has composed around 300 works, over half of them already performed. His pieces are broadcast regularly (Radio Nacional de España, Deutsche Welle, Radio Bremen, Radiofabrik Salzburg, Radio Universitaria São Paulo, Westdeutscher Rundfunk (WDR), Radio Berlin Brandenburg, Bayerischer Rundfunk).

In 2002 he received a commission from the CDMC (Centro para la Difusión de la Música Contemporánea, Madrid), in 2003 from the Kunststiftung NRW (Düsseldorf); in 2004 again from CDMC (Spain) and from the Landesmusikrat Bremen (Bremen Music Council), in 2011 from Eva Espoleta (Geneva). On 30 June 2004 his Concertango was premiered by the Orchestra of the Universität Bremen (cond.: Susanne Gläß).

=== Film music ===
He also composed the music for six short films:

- Desde la ventana ("From the window"), autobiographical documentary film of the Colombian Santiago Herrera Gómez, Cologne, February 1996.
- Mesa para dos (Table for two) by Medardo Amor and Angel Almazán, Madrid, August 2003.
- Electroacoustic music for the experimental short film 'Bipolar' by the German director Axel Largo, Bonn, June 2006.
- Music for the old (1951) scientific silent short film 'Verformung von Metallkristallen' (The Deformation of Metal Crystals, catalogue number C 611 of the IWF, Institut für Film und Bild in Wissenschaft und Unterricht, Abteilung Hochschule und Forschung, Göttingen) by Günter Wassermann (Clausthal). Premiere: cinema Metrópolis, Hamburg, 10 June 2007.
- Corazón en sombras (Heart in shadows) by Medardo Amor and Angel Almazán, Madrid, December 2007.
- Zima by Katarina Stankovich, Cologne, June 2011.

Solare has also written music for internet animations, mainly for movies of the Catalan artist Nuria Juncosa.

== Pianist ==
As a pianist, his repertoire has four centers: classical music from the late Romanticism (such as Franz Liszt or Alexander Scriabin), contemporary classical (John Cage, Arnold Schoenberg), Argentine composers (including tango; Ástor Piazzolla), and his own compositions – both as soloist and in different chamber music groups, notably:

- Duo Tangente (violin -Gert Gondosch- and piano)
- Tango Nomade (saxophone -Eduardo Kohan- and piano)

Solare has performed in cities of Argentina, Germany, the rest of Europe and USA:

- Buenos Aires & its suburban areas, Bariloche, Zárate, Córdoba, Tandil, Mendoza, Tucumán, San Martín de los Andes, Mar del Plata
- Göttingen, Cologne, Bremen, Bremerhaven, Worpswede, Ottersberg, Verden, Munich, Gersfeld, Misselwarden, Berlin, Hamburg, Bonn, Hannover, Heidelberg, Leipzig
- Amsterdam, London, Madrid, Sevilla, Geneva, Svendborg, Graz, Granada, Oviedo, Seinäjoki (Finland).
- College Station (Texas), Waco (Texas)

His first professional recording as a pianist was in July 2006 in Geneva: together with the Saxophonist Eduardo Kohan he recorded the CD Tango Nómade. His first solo cd appeared in January 2010: Tango Monologues. Recording ("digital only" versions, as EP) of his pieces "Acuarelas junto al río inmóvil" (2014), "Aphorismen" (2014), and "Sechs kleine Klavierstücke" von Arnold Schönberg (2014). Since then, his recordings achieved over 25 millions streams on Spotify alone.

Juan María Solare also participated with Fifteen-Minutes-of-Fame, a concert performance series with Vox Novus

== Conductor ==
- 2002–present: Conductor of the Orquesta No Típica at the Universität Bremen
- 2012–2014: Conductor of the Jacobs Chamber Orchestra at the Jacobs University Bremen
- 2013–present: Conductor of the symphonic orchestra of the Bremer OrchesterGemeinschaft

== Awards ==
His compositions have been awarded prizes and awards in

- Argentina Promociones Musicales 1990, Fondo Nacional de las Artes 1996, Tribuna Argentina de Compositores 1999, Tribuna Argentina de Música Electroacústica 2002, Federación Argentina de Música Electroacústica 2005,
- United Kingdom (British & International Bass Forum 1999, Rarescale/Royal College of Music 2004),
- Austria (Yage und Aspekte Salzburg 2000),
- Germany (Walter Witte Viola-Stiftung 2001, Bremer Komponistenwettbewerb 2004) and
- Spain (Radio Clásica-CDMC 2004).

As a pianist, Solare received awards at the following competitions:

- Competition for Young Pianists "Cincuentenario de la Fundación Educacional Jrimián" (50th Anniversary of the Khrimian Educational Foundation) awarded by the Asociación Cultural Armenia, in Lanús (Buenos Aires) in November 1980.
- As a member of the improvisation ensemble Die Kugel, 2nd prize at the "6. Internationaler Wettberwerb für junge Kultur 2000" (6th international competition for young culture) at the Saal Heinersdorff Pianohaus (Steinway-Haus) Düsseldorf, within the frame of the Festival "Düsseldorfer Altstadt Herbst" (SEP 2000).

== Jury member ==
- In January 2002 he served on the piano jury in the competition Jugend musiziert.
- In March 2004 jury in the National competition for young pianists "piccole mani" (Perugia, Italy) with a piece of him in each category as "obligatory piece".
- In September 2004 he was on the jury (composition) in the competition "Xicöatl" (Salzburg).
- 2006 member of the jury of composition contest at the World Music Days (Stuttgart)
- In 2007, Jury of the clarinet competition Maratón Musical Clariperú with his piece Convalecencia as obligatory piece.

== Recordings ==
Thirteen CDs from different performers include at least one of his pieces:

- "Panorama de la música argentina (compositores nacidos entre 1965–1969)". Fondo Nacional de las Artes. IRCO 318 (with three of his Siete Monedas for flute, viola and cello).
- "Pifferari – Werke für Flöte und Klarinette", Juli 2001. Regine Kuhn (flute) and Heidi Voss (clarinet); Edition Voss (Wiesbaden, Germany) [includes the "Suite Modal"]
- "60x60: 2003" (various composers). Capstone Records CPS-8744 (released 2004). Includes Nice Noise (track 54).
- Natalia González, pianist: Concierto Tango. 2005, Pretal PRCD 127 (includes Mozartango)
- Duo Eduardo Kohan – Juan Solare (saxophone & piano), Tango Nómade. 2006 (includes Tengo un tango, Sale con fritas, Tango en ciernes, Octango & Nómade)
- Trío Thelema. 2006 (Includes Hypnosis)
- Mariana Levitin (cello) & Guillermo Carro (piano), in the CD Los compositores académicos argentinos y el tango II (1879–2007) / Argentine classical composers and the tango II (1879–2007). 2007. Pretal PRCD 138 (includes "Nómade" 2nd movement from Sonatango in version for cello and piano).
- "Parajes", Label IRCO 1263 (SKU: 7147) (2009), with Vacío Blanco performed by Silvia Dabul (piano) & Víctor Torres (bariton).
- Tango Monologues, 2010. Juan María Solare (piano). (Features 12 pieces by Solare: Pasaje Seaver, Valsarín, Tengo un tango, Para Lisa, Milonga fría, Atonalgotán, Fragmentango, Akemilonga, Liebergmilonga, Talismán, Furor and Reencuentro.)
- Argentine Cello, 2011. Zoe Knighton (cello) & Amir Farid (piano). Move Records (Australia), MD 3347. (includes Tengo un tango, Nómade -from Sonatango- and Talismán).
- Tango Music Award 2011, 2011. Cafe Tango Orchestra (cond.: Judy Ruks). Cafe Tango Productions, Stuttgart 2011. Includes Barro sublevado (Track 15).
- Ideas y emociones, 2012. Label Fonocal, Productor: Saúl Cosentino. Includes Reencuentro, recorded by Leonardo Suárez Paz (violin) + Juan María Solare (piano). (Track 15).
- Pasión argentina (tango & chamber music), 2013. Label Ultramar Music Argentina. Ultramar ensemble: Paula Gasparini (flute), Tamara Moser (piano) and Pablo Pizarro (cello). Includes Tengo un tango (track 2) in version for flute, cello and piano.
- Gardel al piano. Label Janus Music & Sound, 2014 (JMS-003). Juan María Solare, piano, EP with six tracks composed by Carlos Gardel.
- Himmelsrichtungen (Cardinal Points). Label Janus Music & Sound, 2016 (JMS-008). Juan María Solare, piano, EP with six tracks composed by himself.

== Interviews ==
- Your Story: Juan María Solare blog Pianodao, November 2017.
- Interview with Juan María Solare, by Anna Sutyagina from the blog Moving Classics TV (September 2018)
- Mit Musik durch’s Leben, Blog ProntoPro (in German), May 2020.
- An Interview with Juan María Solare, blog Secret Eclectic, June 2020.

== Works dedicated to him ==
Solare has been dedicated pieces by several colleagues:

- "Para la mano derecha" (For the right hand) by Pedro Sáenz, 1992.
- "Rosales olorosos a Solare", electro-humour-acoustic music by Gabriel Pareyon (after a poem by G. Ropenay), DEC/2002
- "Un marzo triste", piano piece by Saúl Cosentino, 2003.
- "Lo que se fue", chamber tango by Jorge Pítari, 2005.
- "Tres minitangos" for piano by Jorge Pítari, 2006.
- "Solare-Tango", chamber tango by Luis Mihovilcevic (second of the "Serie de tangos de nobles afinidades"), 2007.
- "El canto nocturnal de los caracoles" for piano, by Luis Mihovilcevic, 2005.
- "Meditativo" for piano, by Juliane Dehning, 2008.
- "Amanecer en la terrible Buenos Aires", milonga for piano, by Claudio Maldonado, 2009.
- "Contemplación", piano piece by Saúl Cosentino, 2009.
- "Wintergesang" (Winter song) for cello & piano, by Juliane Dehning, 2009.
- "Milonga meets Malambo", piece for cello and piano by Juan Manuel Abras, 2011.
- Daydreams of Gardel on the Orbits of Saturn for piano solo, by Rodrigo Baggio, 2012.
- Tango-lá for piano solo, by Micky Landau, 2012.
- Y se alejó por el camino de los cipreses for piano solo, by Luis Menacho, 2012.
- Pussycat Tango for piano solo, by Kelly M. Curran, 2012.
- Algo neto for piano solo, by Valentín Pelisch, 2012.
- Tango Triste for piano solo, by Leonard Mark Lewis, 2012.
- Tango del Minuto for piano solo, by José Hernán Civils, 2012.
- Expulsado de la Milonga for piano solo, by Douglas DaSilva, 2012.
- Sin-Con Ciencia for piano solo, by Moxi Beidenegl, 2012.
- tango sostenido for piano solo, by Jon Aveyard, 2012.
- Napoleon's Tango for piano solo, by Daniel Arnold, 2012.
- Today and Tomorrow for piano solo, by Bob Siebert, 2012.
- Picture Beständigkeit des Nebels (Solidity of Mist), by walkala (Luis Alfredo Duarte Herrera), Salzburg, July 2007. 100 cm x 150 cm, acrylic on canvas.

== Publications ==
Some of his works have been published by Dohr Verlag (Cologne), Ricordi München (Munich), peermusic (Hamburg) and Peters Verlag (Leipzig).

Beside his compositional and pianistic activities he also has written for diverse publications, such as the New Grove (Solare 2001), La Sibila Sevilla, Doce Notas and ABC Madrid, Pauta and L'Orfeo (Mexico), Tempo (UK), as well as for the radio stations Deutsche Welle and Südwestfunk (SWF).

About 30 of his 200 published articles (mostly in Solare's mother tongue, Spanish) can be found online.
