= William Kapell discography =

William Kapell (September 20, 1922 – October 29, 1953) was an American classical pianist who recorded for RCA Victor.

== Recordings ==
Many of Kapell's recordings were originally issued as 78 rpm records. Some were issued on LP, but by 1960, all of Kapell's commercial recordings were out of print. RCA reissued Beethoven's Concerto No. 2 and Prokofiev's Concerto No. 3 on LP in the early 1970s, and bootlegged copies of the commercial recordings and unlicensed recordings of live performances circulated among collectors.

In the 1980s, RCA Victor released two compact discs of Kapell's recordings, including the Prokofiev Third and Khachaturian Piano Concerto, and an all-Chopin disc.

A nine CD survey, The William Kapell Edition, released by RCA Victor in 1998 contains all of the pianist's authorized recordings with that label, several previously unreleased tracks, and an interview. The set sold well internationally and sparked a revival of interest in Kapell's artistry.

In 1999 Philips Classics included Kapell's studio performances of Prokofiev and Rachmaninov with Antal Doráti in Dallas, and William Steinberg and Fritz Reiner in Philadelphia along with the solo studio performances of works by Albéniz, Bach, Chopin and Liszt as part of their 200-CD Great Pianists of the 20th Century set.

In addition, recordings taken from radio broadcasts of live performances have been issued on several labels, including Kapell ReDiscovered, which documents his final appearances.

== Discography ==
The listing below contains only compact disc releases and does not contain 78rpm, LP, cassette, or 8-track cartridge releases.

Year of issue	Album title and details	Recording date(s)	Record label
2008	Kapell ReDiscovered – The Australian Broadcasts (2 CDs): Rachmaninoff: Piano Concerto No. 3 in D minor, Op. 30; Victorian Symphony Orchestra/Sir Bernard Heinze, conductor; Traditional: God Save the King; J. S. Bach: Suite in A minor, BWV 818; Mussorgsky: Pictures at an Exhibition; Mozart: Piano Sonata in B-flat major, K. 570; Chopin: Barcarolle, Op. 60 / Nocturne in E-flat major, Op. 55, No. 2 / Scherzo in B minor, Op. 20; Prokofiev: Piano Sonata in B-flat major, Op. 83; Debussy: Suite bergamasque	1953	RCA
1998	William Kapell Edition, Volume 1: Chopin: Twenty-nine Mazurkas	1951–1952	RCA
1998	William Kapell Edition, Volume 2: Chopin: Sonata in B-flat minor, Op. 35 / Sonata in B minor, Op. 58 / Waltz in E-flat major, Op. 18 / Nocturne in B-flat minor, Op. 9, No. 1; Mendelssohn: Song without Words in B minor, Op. 67, No. 5; Schumann: Romance in F-sharp major, Op. 28, No. 2; W. A. Mozart: Piano Sonata in C major, K. 545	1945–1953	RCA
1998	William Kapell Edition, Volume 3: Rachmaninoff: Piano Concerto No. 2 in C minor, Op. 18 / Rhapsody on a Theme of Paganini, Op. 43+; Robin Hood Dell Orchestra of Philadelphia/William Steinberg, conductor/Fritz Reiner, conductor+; Rachmaninoff: Prelude in C-sharp minor, Op. 3, No. 2; Shostakovich: Preludes, Op. 34: No. 24 in D minor, No. 10 in C-sharp minor, No. 5 in D major	1944–1951	RCA
1998	William Kapell Edition, Volume 4: Khachaturian: Piano Concerto in D-flat major; Boston Symphony Orchestra/Serge Koussevitzky, conductor; Prokofiev: Piano Concerto No. 3 in C major, Op. 26; Dallas Symphony Orchestra/Antal Doráti, conductor; Shostakovich: Three Preludes, Op. 34: No. 15 in S-flat major, No. 10 in C-sharp minor, No. 5 in D major	1945–1949	RCA
1998	William Kapell Edition, Volume 5: Beethoven: Piano Concerto No. 2 in B-flat major, Op. 19; NBC Symphony Orchestra/Vladimir Golschmann, conductor; Schubert: Moment Musical No. 3 in F minor, D. 780, No. 3 / Four Waltzes from D. 145 / Two German Dances from D. 783 / Waltz, D. 365, No. 34 / Two Ländler, D. 734; Schumann: Romance in F-sharp major, Op. 28, No. 2; Brahms: Intermezzo in E major, Op. 116, No. 6; Liszt: Sonetto 104 del Petrarcha, S. 161, No. 5 / Hungarian Rhapsody No. 11 in A minor, S. 244 / Mephisto Waltz, S. 110, No. 2	1945–1953	RCA
1998	William Kapell Edition, Volume 6: J. S. Bach: Suite in A minor, BWV 818 / Partita in D major, BWV 828; D. Scarlatti: Sonata in E major, K.380; W. A. Mozart: Adagio from Piano Sonata in B-flat major, K. 570; Albeniz: Evocación from Iberia, Book 1; Chasins: Piano Playtime: No. 1, By the Brook; No. 5: Dancing Bagpipes; No. 6, Tricky Trumpet; Debussy: Children's Corner Suite; Palmer: Toccata ostinato	1945–1953	RCA
1998	William Kapell Edition, Volume 7: Brahms: Sonata for Violin and Piano in D minor, Op. 108; Jascha Heifetz, violin; Brahms: Sonata for Viola and Piano in F minor, Op. 120, No. 1; William Primrose, viola; Rachmaninoff: Sonata for Cello and Piano in G minor, Op. 19; Edmund Kurtz, cello	1947–1950	RCA
1998	William Kapell Edition, Volume 8 Frick Collection Recital – March 1, 1953: Copland: Piano Sonata; Chopin: Nocturne in E-flat major, Op. 55, NO. 2 / Mazurka in C major, Op. 33, No. 3 / Polonaise-Fantasie, Op. 61; Mussorgsky: Pictures at an Exhibition; Schumann: Of Foreign Lands and People from Kinderszenen, Op. 15; D. Scarlatti: Sonata in E major, K. 380	1953	RCA
1998	William Kapell Edition, Volume 9 An Artist at Work: Fragments; Alternate Takes; Interview		RCA
2000	William Kapell in Performance: Brahms: Piano Concerto No. 1 in D minor, Op. 15; New York Philharmonic/Dimitri Mitropoulos, conductor; Prokofiev: Piano Concerto No. 3 in C major, Op. 26; New York Philharmonic/Leopold Stokowski, conductor	1949–1953	Music & Arts
1997	Kapell in Recital: Beethoven: Largo and Rondo from Piano Concerto No. 3 in C minor, Op. 37; National Orchestral Association/Leon Barzin, conductor; Piano Concerto No. 1 in C minor, Op. 35; Philadelphia Orchestra/Eugene Ormandy, conductor; Mussorgsky: Pictures at an Exhibition; J. S. Bach: Nun komm der Heiden Heiland (arr. Busoni)	1937–1951	Arbiter
1996	Beethoven: Piano Concerto No. 2 in B-flat major, Op. 19; NBC Symphony Orchestra//Vladimir Golschmann, conductor; Rachmaninoff: Rhapsody on a Theme of Paganini, Op. 43; New York Philharmonic/Artur Rodziński, conductor; Schubert: Lieder; Maria Stader, soprano; Chopin: Polonaise in A-flat major, Op. 53		Pearl
2002	Unissued Broadcasts: Piano Concerto No. 2 in C minor, Op. 18; New York Philharmonic/Leonard Bernstein, conductor; Khachaturian: Piano Concerto in D-flat major; Philadelphia Orchestra/Eugene Ormandy, conductor	1944–1951	Music & Arts
1994	Broadcast Performances, Volume 1: Rachmaninoff: Piano Concerto No. 3 in D minor, Op. 30; Toronto Symphony Orchestra/Sir Ernest MacMillan, conductor; Khachaturian: Piano Concerto in D-flat major; NBC Symphony Orchestra/Frank Black, conductor	1945–1948	VAI Audio
1995	Broadcast Performances, Volume 2: Debussy: Children's Corner; Liszt: Hungarian Rhapsody in D-flat major, S. 244, No. 6 / Hungarian Rhapsody in A minor, S. 244, No. 11; Mussorgsky: Pictures at an Exhibition; W. A. Mozart: Piano Sonata in B-flat major, K. 570; J. S. Bach: Allemande and Courante from Partita in D major, BWV 828	1942–1953	VAI Audio
