= Alfred Brendel discography =

The pianist Alfred Brendel KBE (5 January 1931 – 17 June 2025) was a recording artist for more than half a century, from his first record of Prokofiev's Piano Concerto No. 5 at the age of 21, to his farewell concerts in 2008, recorded in Hanover and Vienna. He has recorded with only three record companies: Vox Records, Decca and Philips. His discography contains many albums and compilations of multiple recordings from different composers featuring him as a pianist.

== Overview ==
Alfred Brendel made his first recording at the age of 21 and has since recorded a wide range of piano repertoire. He was the first pianist ever to record the complete solo piano works of Beethoven. He has also recorded works by Mozart, Liszt, Brahms, Schumann and Schubert. In contemporary music he has recorded the piano concerto op.42 by Schoenberg, the piano sonata by Alban Berg, etc.

Brendel recorded extensively for the VOX label, providing them his first of three sets of the complete Beethoven sonatas. He did not secure a major recording contract until the 1970s. His breakthrough came after a recital of Beethoven at the Queen Elizabeth Hall in London; the day after, three major record labels called his agent. Since the 1970s, Brendel has recorded for Philips Classics.

== Partial Discography ==
=== Albums ===
Year of issue	Album title	Recording date(s)	Label
1980	Schumann: Works for Oboe and Piano	1980	Philips
1992	Schumann: Kreisleriana; Kinderszenen; Fantasiestücke	1980	Philips
2008	Beethoven: Piano Concertos 4 & 5	12/1997, 2/1998	Philips
	The Artist's Choice: Alfred Brendel – Live at the BBC		
1998	Schumann: Piano Concerto; Fantasy Op.17	1998	Philips
1985	Schubert: Winterreise	1985	Philips
1997	Schubert: The Complete Impromptus / Moments Musicaux	1972, 1974, 1975	Philips
	Schubert: Impromptus D899, Op90; Impromptus D935, Op142: Impromptus D899 (Op. 90) / Impromptus D935 (Op. posth. 142)		
	Schubert: Complete Impromptus, D899 & D935; 11 Ecossaises, etc.		
	Schubert: Forellenquintett / Mozart: Piano Quartet In G Minor: Franz Schubert – Quintet for piano, violin, viola, cello & double bass in A major ("Trout"), D. 667 (Op. posth. 114); Wolfgang Amadeus Mozart – Piano Quartet No. 1 in G minor, K. 478	1994	Philips
	Schubert: Piano Sonatas in A and A minor, D664 & D537	1982	Philips
	Schubert: Piano Sonatas in A minor and D major, D784 & D850	1987	Philips
	Schubert: Piano Sonata in A, D.959 / No.20; Hungarian Melody; 16 German Dances etc.		
	Schubert: Piano Sonata In C minor, D958; 6 Moments Musicaux, D.780		
	Mozart: Piano Concertos No.22 in E flat, K.482; No.27 in B flat, K.595		Philips
	Mozart: Piano Concertos No.21 in C, K.467; No.15 in B flat, K.450; No.23 in A, K.488		Philips
	Mozart: Piano Concertos No.20 in D minor, K.466; No.24 in C minor, K.491		Philips
	Beethoven: Diabelli Variations		Philips
	Beethoven: Piano Sonatas Nos. 26 & 29		
1985	Beethoven: Für Elise; Eroica Variations, Op.35; 6 Bagatelles Op.126; 6 Ecossaises	3/1984	DECCA
1985	Haydn: 3 Sonatas, Andante Con Variazioni: Piano Sonata L. 62 Hob. XVI/52 / Piano Sonata L. 54 Hob. XVI/40 / Piano Sonata L. 50 Hob. XVI/37 / Andante Con Variazioni Hob. XVII/6	7/1985	Philips
1989	6 Moments musicaux, Op.94 D.780 – No.1 in C (Moderato)		Philips
1989	Schubert: Piano Works 1822–1828		Philips
1989	Schubert: Piano Sonata in A minor, D. 845; 3 Klavierstücke, D. 946: Piano Sonata No. 16 in A minor, D. 845 (Op. 42) / Three impromptus for piano, D. 946	1987	Philips
1992	Beethoven: Piano Concerto No. 5; Fantasia in C minor: London Philharmonic Orchestra / London Philharmonic Choir / John Alldis, Conductor		Philips
1993	Beethoven: The Late Piano Sonatas: Piano Sonata No. 27 in E minor, Op. 90 / Piano Sonata No. 28 in A major, Op. 101 / Piano Sonata No. 30 in E major, Op. 109 / Piano Sonata No. 31 in A flat major, Op. 110 / Piano Sonata No. 29 in B flat major ("Hammerklavier"), Op. 106 / Piano Sonata No. 32 in C minor, Op. 111	1970–1975	Philips
	Schubert: The Last Three Piano Sonatas: Piano Sonata No. 19 in C minor, D. 958 / Piano Sonata No. 20 in A major, D. 959 / Piano Sonata No. 21 in B flat major, D. 960 / Three Impromptus for piano, D. 946	1971–1974	Philips
1993	Beethoven: Piano Sonatas Op. 53, 54 & 101; Andante favouri		DECCA
1993	Beethoven: Piano Sonatas Nos. 16–18: No. 16 in G, Op. 31 No. 1 / No.17 in D minor, Op. 31 No. 2 "Tempest" / No.18 in E flat, Op.31 No.3 "The Hunt"		DECCA
1994	Schubert: The Last Three Piano Sonatas		Philips
1994	Mozart: The Great Piano Concertos, Vol.1		DECCA
1994	Mozart: The Great Piano Concertos Nos. 9, 15, 22, 25 & 27		Philips
1994	Beethoven: Favourite Piano Sonatas: No. 8 in C minor, Op. 13 / No. 14 in C-sharp minor "Moonlight" / No.15 in D major, Op.28 / No. 26 in E flat major, Op. 81a / No. 17 in D minor, Op. 31, No. 2 "The Tempest" / No. 21 in C major, Op. 53 "Waldstein" / No. 23 in F minor, Op. 57 "Appassionata"		Philips
1994	Beethoven: Sonatas Op. 26, Op. 27 No. 1, Op. 27 No. 2 "Moonlight" & Op. 49 No. 1		Philips
1995	Beethoven: Piano Sonatas, Op. 2 Nos. 1–3		DECCA
1995	Beethoven: Piano Sonatas Nos. 8–11		DECCA
1996	Mussorgsky: Pictures at an Exhibition (Piano & Orchestral versions)		Philips
1996	Beethoven: Piano Sonatas Nos. 5, 6 & 7		DECCA
1997	Beethoven: Piano Sonatas op. 7 & 28 Pastoral & 49 No. 2		DECCA
1999	Beethoven: Piano Sonatas, Op. 109, 110 & 111		DECCA
1999	Schubert: Piano Sonata No.20, D 959; Hungarian Melody; 16 German Dances etc.		Philips
1999	Liszt: Années de pèlerinage, Books 1–3		Philips
1999	Schubert: Piano Sonata in A minor, D 845; 3 Klavierstücke, D 946	1987	Philips
1999	Beethoven: The 5 Piano Concertos: Vienna Philharmonic Orchestra / Simon Rattle, Conductor		Philips
2000	Mozart: Piano Sonatas: Rondo for piano No. 3 in A minor, K. 511; Piano Sonata No. 11 in A major ("Alla Turca") K. 331 (K. 300i); Piano Sonata No. 16 in B flat major, K. 570; Piano Sonata No. 10 in C major, K. 330 (K. 300h)	1998 / 1999	Philips
2000	Schubert: Piano Sonata No 21, D 960; Wanderer Fantasie, D760		Philips
2000	Mozart: Piano Sonatas No.11 in A, K.331 -"Alla Turca"; No.17 in B flat, K.570; No.10 in C major, K.330		Philips
2000	Beethoven: Bagatelles Opp.33, 119 & 126; Für Elise; Rondo in C; Allegretto in C minor; Klavierstück in B flat		DECCA
2001	Mozart: Piano Sonatas K.322, K.333 & K.457		Philips
2001	Beethoven: Piano Concertos Nos. 1 and 4		
2001	Beethoven: Piano Concertos Nos. 2 & 3		DECCA
2002	Mozart: Piano Concertos K.271 "Jeunehomme" & K.503		DECCA
2002	Mozart: Piano Concertos K.271 "Jeunehomme" & K.503		DECCA
2002	Beethoven: Complete Piano Concertos		Philips
2003	Mozart: Piano Sonatas K 310, 311, 533/494; Fantasy K.397		Philips
	Schubert: Piano Quintet – "Trout”: Quintet for piano, violin, viola, cello & double bass in A major ("Trout"), D. 667 (Op. posth. 114)		Philips
2005	Schubert: Schwanengesang; Beethoven: An die Ferne Geliebte: Ludwig van Beethoven – An die ferne Geliebte, song cycle for voice & piano, Op. 98; Franz Schubert – Herbst ("Es rauschen die Winde"), song for voice & piano, D. 945 / Schwanengesang (Swan Song), song cycle for voice & piano, D. 957; Rellstab-Lieder. Liebesbotschaft / Rellstab-Lieder. Kriegers Ahnung / Rellstab-Lieder. Frühlingssehnsucht / Rellstab-Lieder. Ständchen / Rellstab-Lieder. Aufenthalt / Rellstab-Lieder. In der Ferne / Rellstab-Lieder. Abschied / Heine-Lieder. Der Atlas / Heine-Lieder. Ihr Bild / Heine-Lieder. Das Fischermädchen / Heine-Lieder. Die Stadt / Heine-Lieder. Am Meer / Heine-Lieder. Der Doppelgänger / Seidl-Lied. Die Taubenpost	2003	DECCA
2005	Mozart: Piano Concertos Nos.20, 23 & Concert Rondos		DECCA
2006	Mozart: Complete Edition Box 6: Quintets, Quartets etc.		Philips
2006	Mozart: Piano Concertos K414 & K453		Philips
2006	Liszt: Sonata in B minor etc.		Philips
2007	JS Bach: Italian Concerto, etc.: Italian Concerto in F, BWV 971 / Ich ruf zu dir, Herr Jesu Christ, BWV 639 / Prelude (Fantasy) in A minor, BWV 922 / Chromatic Fantasia and Fugue in D minor, BWV 903 / Nun komm, der Heiden Heiland, BWV 659 / Fantasia and Fugue in A minor, BWV 904	1976	Philips
2008	Alfred Brendel: The Complete Vox, Turnabout and Vanguard Solo Recordings (36CDs)	numerous, mainly 1959–1962	Brilliant Classics (original by Vox)
2008	Beethoven: Piano Concertos Nos. 4 & 5: Wiener Philharmoniker / Simon Rattle, Conductor		Philips
2009	Beethoven: Piano Concerto No. 5; Piano Sonata Op. 57, "Appassionata": Wiener Philharmoniker / Simon Rattle, Conductor		Philips
2009	The Farewell Concerts	2008	DECCA
2009	Beethoven: Piano Sonatas Nos. 8, 14, 23 & 26		Philips

=== Compilations ===
Year of Issue	Details	Recording Date(s)	Label
1998	Great Pianists of the 20th Century – Alfred Brendel I: Haydn: Keyboard Sonata in E minor, H. 16/34 / Keyboard Sonata in G major, H. 16/40 / Keyboard Sonata in D major, H. 16/42 / Keyboard Sonata in E flat major, H. 16/52; Schubert: Impromptus, D. 899 (Op. 90) / Impromptus, D. 935 (Op. posth. 142); Schumann: Fantasiestücke (8 Fantasy Pieces), Op. 12	1982–1991	Philips Classics
1999	Great Pianists of the 20th Century – Alfred Brendel II: Beethoven: Piano Sonata No. 29 in B flat major, Op. 106 "Hammerklavier" / Bagatelles, Op. 126 / Variations on Salieri's "La Stessa, le Stessissima," in B flat major, WoO 73 / Diabelli Variations, Op. 120 / Piano Sonata No. 32 in C minor, Op. 111	1963–1995	Philips Classics
1999	Great Pianists of the 20th Century – Alfred Brendel III	1968–1989	Philips Classics
2006	The Artist's Choice Collection: Alfred Brendel		Philips
2006	The Artist's Choice: Alfred Brendel plays Beethoven		Philips
2006	The Artist's Choice: Alfred Brendel plays Haydn and Mozart		Philips
2006	The Artist's Choice: Alfred Brendel plays Liszt and Schumann		Philips
2006	The Artist's Choice: Alfred Brendel plays Schubert		Philips
2007	Alfred Brendel in Recital: Beethoven: Diabelli Variations / Piano Sonata No. 28 in A major, Op. 101; Chopin: Andante spianato et grande polonaise brillante; Mendelssohn: Variations sérieuses, Op. 54; Busoni: Elegies Nos. 3 and 6	1968–2001	Philips
2007	Alfred Brendel – Unpublished Live and Radio Performances 1968–2001	1968–2001	Philips

=== Boxed Sets ===
Year of Issue	Details	Recording Date(s)	Label
1986	Haydn: 11 Piano Sonatas		Philips
1996	Mozart: Favourite Works for Piano		DECCA
1996	Beethoven: Complete Piano Sonatas: 10 CDs		Philips
2001	Schubert: Piano Sonatas Nos.9,18,20, & 21		DECCA
2004	Beethoven: Complete Works for Piano & Cello		DECCA
2005	Complete Mozart Edition: Piano Concertos: 12 CDs		Philips
2016	Alfred Brendel: The Complete Philips Recordings: 114 CDs	1970–2008	DECCA

=== Video Releases ===
Year of Issue	Details	Recording Date(s)	Label
2011	Alfred Brendel on Music: Three Lectures: 2 DVDs		C Major
