= Martha Argerich =

Argentine pianist (born 1941)

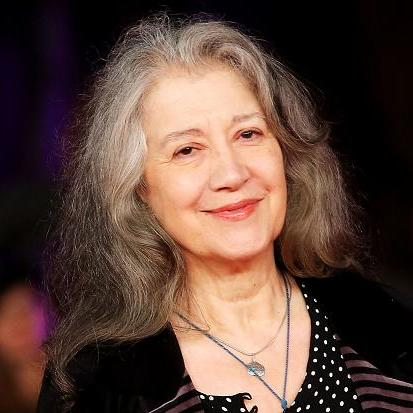
- Argerich in 2015

Background information
- Born: 5 June 1941 (age 85); Buenos Aires, Argentina
- Genre: Classical
- Occupation: Musician
- Instrument: Piano
- Labels: Deutsche Grammophon; Warner Classics; Philips
- Spouses: Robert Chen (m. 1964; div. 1964); Charles Dutoit (m. 1969; div. 1973)
- Citizenship: Argentina; Switzerland

Martha Argerich (Spanish pronunciation: [ˈmaɾta aɾxeˈɾitʃ]; born 5 June 1941) is an Argentine classical concert pianist. She is widely considered one of the greatest pianists of all time.

Born and raised in Buenos Aires, Argerich gave her debut concert at the age of eight before receiving further piano training in Europe. At sixteen, she won both the Geneva International Music Competition and the Ferruccio Busoni International Competition, and her international career was launched after winning the International Chopin Piano Competition in 1965. Since the 1980s she has prioritized collaborative performance, appearing frequently with artists including Nelson Freire, Mischa Maisky, and Gidon Kremer. Argerich is particularly known for her interpretations of the music of Chopin, Ravel, Liszt, Prokofiev, and Schumann.

== Early life and education ==
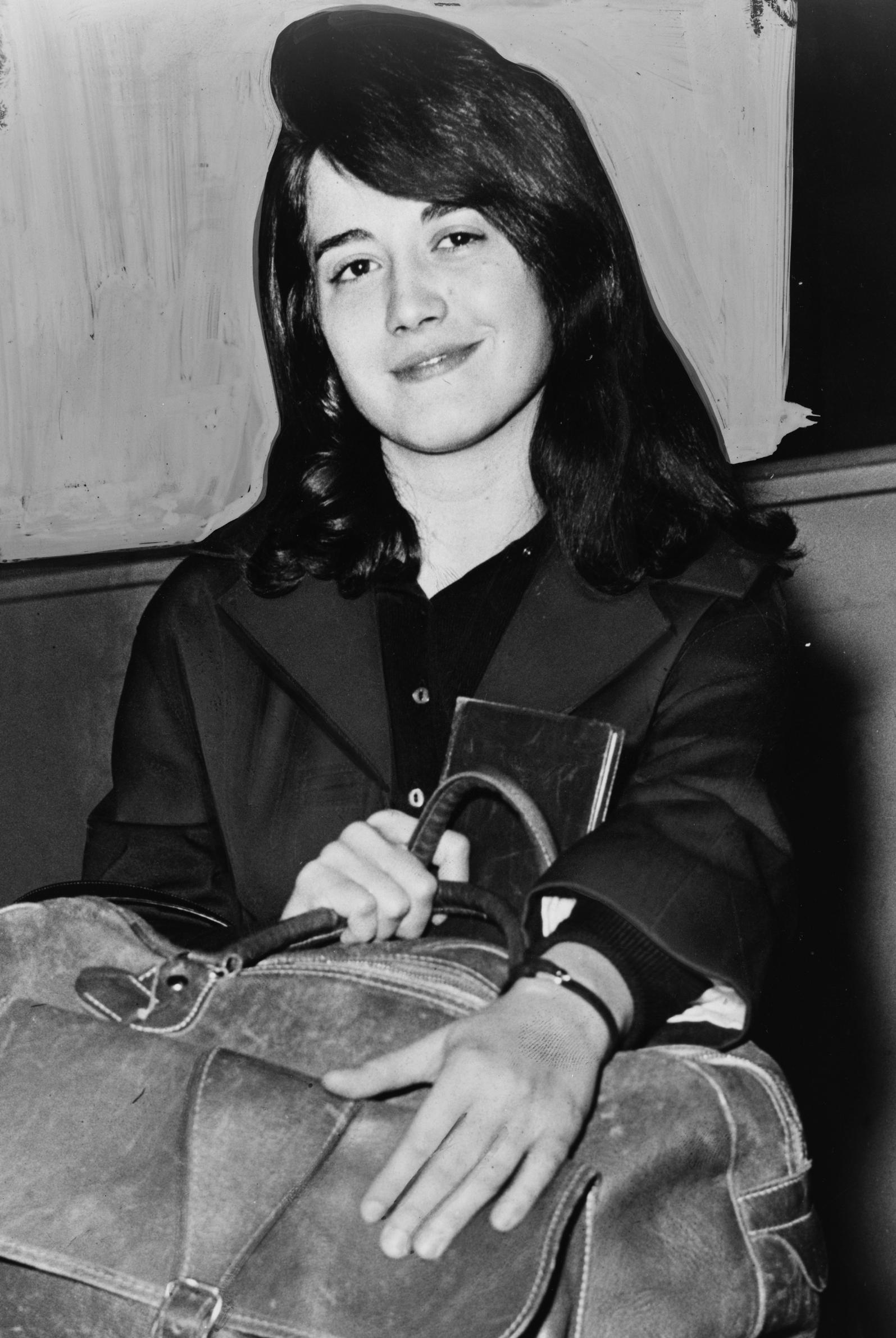
Argerich in 1962

Argerich was born in Buenos Aires. Her maternal grandparents were Russian-Jewish immigrants from the Russian Empire who settled in Colonia Villa Clara in Argentina's Entre Ríos Province, one of the colonies established by Baron de Hirsch and the Jewish Colonization Association.

Argerich began kindergarten around three years old, where she was the youngest child. A five-year-old boy, who was a friend, told her that she would not be able to play the piano and Argerich responded by playing a piece perfectly by ear. She started learning the piano at the age of three. At the age of five, she began to study under Vincenzo Scaramuzza, who emphasized lyricism and feeling.

Argerich performed in her first concert in 1949 at the age of eight. Six years later, her family moved to Europe. Argerich studied with Friedrich Gulda in Austria, whom she described as one of her major influences. She later studied with Stefan Askenase and Maria Curcio.

Argerich also studied under Madeleine Lipatti (widow of Dinu Lipatti), Abbey Simon, and Nikita Magaloff. In 1957, aged sixteen, she won both the Ferruccio Busoni International Competition and the Geneva International Music Competition. (Note: At the latter she met Arturo Benedetti Michelangeli, whom she would later seek out for lessons – although she studied with him for over a year, she only had four lessons with him. Michelangeli, when asked what he had done for Argerich, replied: "I taught her the gift of silence".)

Following this success Argerich had a personal and artistic crisis. After an attempt to study with the Italian pianist Arturo Benedetti Michelangeli, who gave her only four lessons in the space of 18 months, she went to New York City with the intention of studying under Vladimir Horowitz. For three years, Argerich stopped playing piano and considered pursuing a career as a secretary or doctor. She credited Anny Askenase, the wife of Stefan Askenase, with encouraging her to return to the piano.

== Professional career ==
External audio
- Martha Argerich performing Johann Sebastian Bach's Partita No. 2 in C minor, BWV 826 Here on archive.org

Argerich’s performing career began in Argentina. In 1949 she gave her first concerto performance at the age of eight at the Auditorio Radio El Mundo in Buenos Aires, Argentina, playing Beethoven’s Piano Concerto No. 1 and Mozart’s Piano Concerto No. 20 the following year, under the direction of Scaramuzza. Both concerts were broadcast on the National Radio of Argentina. Argerich gave additional concerts as part of a radio concert series for soloists and appeared in a series which featured Beethoven’s piano sonatas.

In 1952, she made her debut at the Teatro Colón in Buenos Aires, performing Schumann’s Piano Concerto in A Minor with the Buenos Aires Philharmonic under the direction of Washington Castro. At eleven years old, Argerich toured the country twice.

In 1960, Argerich had made her first commercial recording, which included works by Chopin, Brahms, Ravel, Prokofiev and Liszt. It received critical acclaim upon its release in 1961. She has since recorded works by composers including Ginastera, Rachmaninoff and Schumann, with whom she describes feeling a particular connection.

She gained international attention when she won the VII International Chopin Piano Competition in Warsaw in 1965, at age 24. On January 16, 1966, she made her American debut at the Lincoln Center's Philharmonic Hall performing Schuman's Op. 17, Prokofiev's Sonata No. 7 and various works by Chopin.

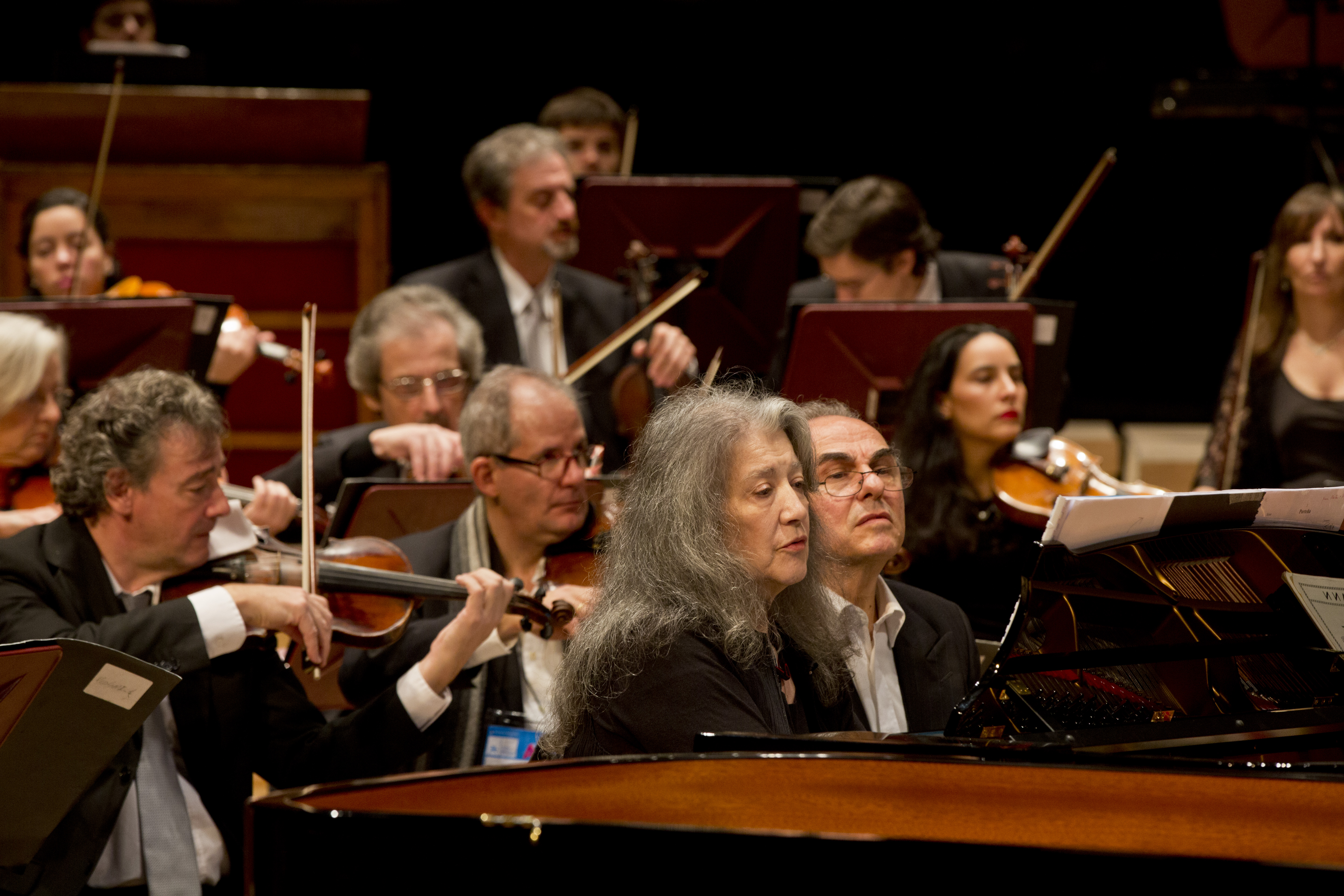
Argerich performing at the Kirchner Cultural Centre, July 2015

Argerich has often remarked in interviews of feeling "lonely" on stage during solo performances. Since the 1980s, she has staged few solo performances, concentrating instead on concertos and chamber music, and collaborating with instrumentalists in sonatas.

Argerich has also promoted younger pianists through her annual festival and through her appearances as a member of the jury at international competitions. She has supported several artists, including Gabriela Montero, Mauricio Vallina, Sergio Tiempo, Roberto Carnevale, Gabriele Baldocci, and Christopher Falzone.

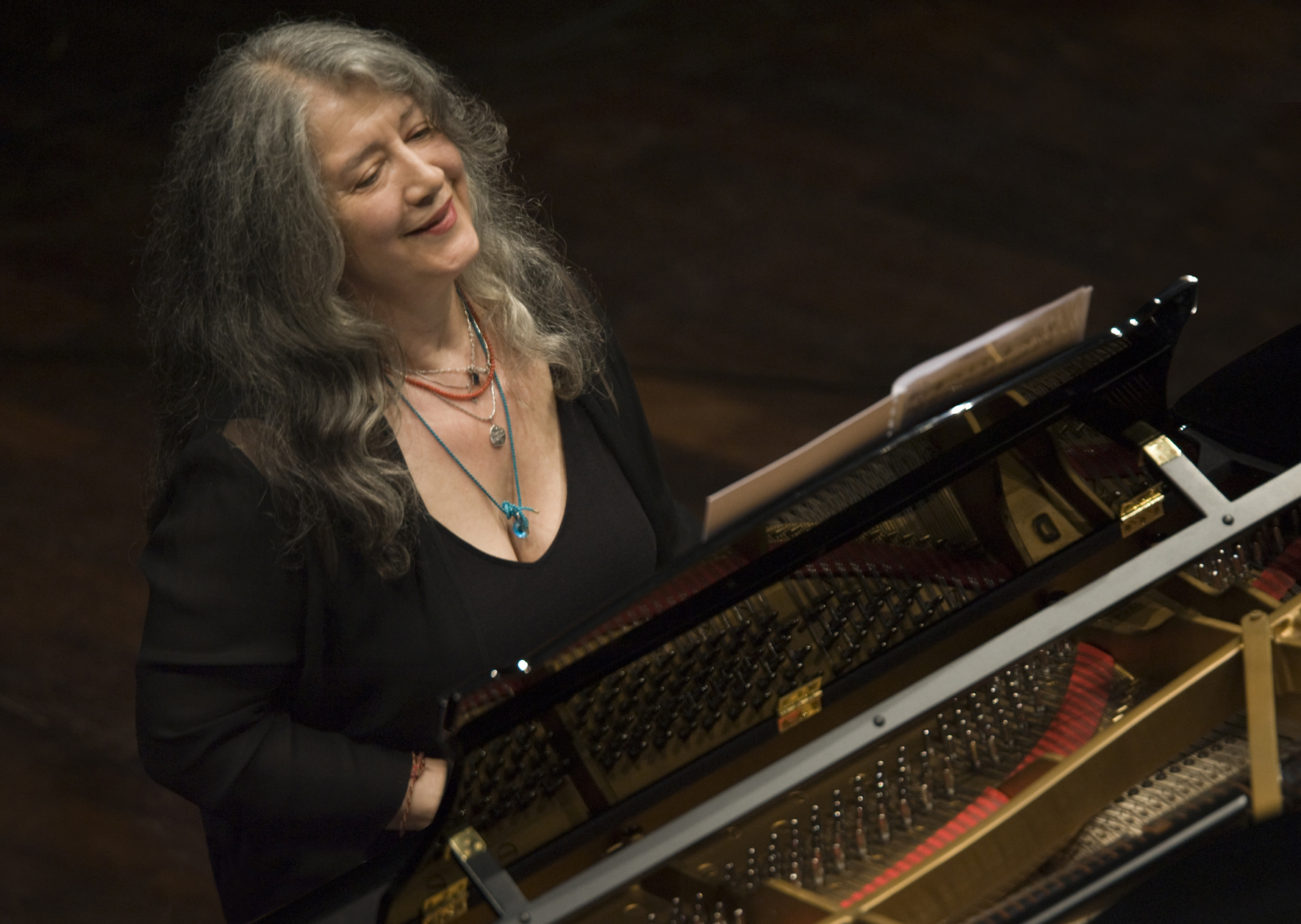
Argerich performing at the later Kirchner Cultural Centre, 2008

Argerich is the president of the International Piano Academy Lake Como and performs annually at the Lugano Festival. She has also created and has served as a General Director of the Argerich Music Festival and Encounter in Beppu, Japan, since 1996.

She has been described as one of the greatest contemporary pianists. Based on a survey of 100 professional pianists, the BBC Music Magazine ranked Argerich among the top 21 pianists of all time. The Gramophone Magazine included Argerich among the top 50 pianists on record for her recording of Chopin Piano Concertos Nos 1 & 2 with the Montreal Symphony Orchestra under Charles Dutoit (Warner Classics).

== Personal life ==
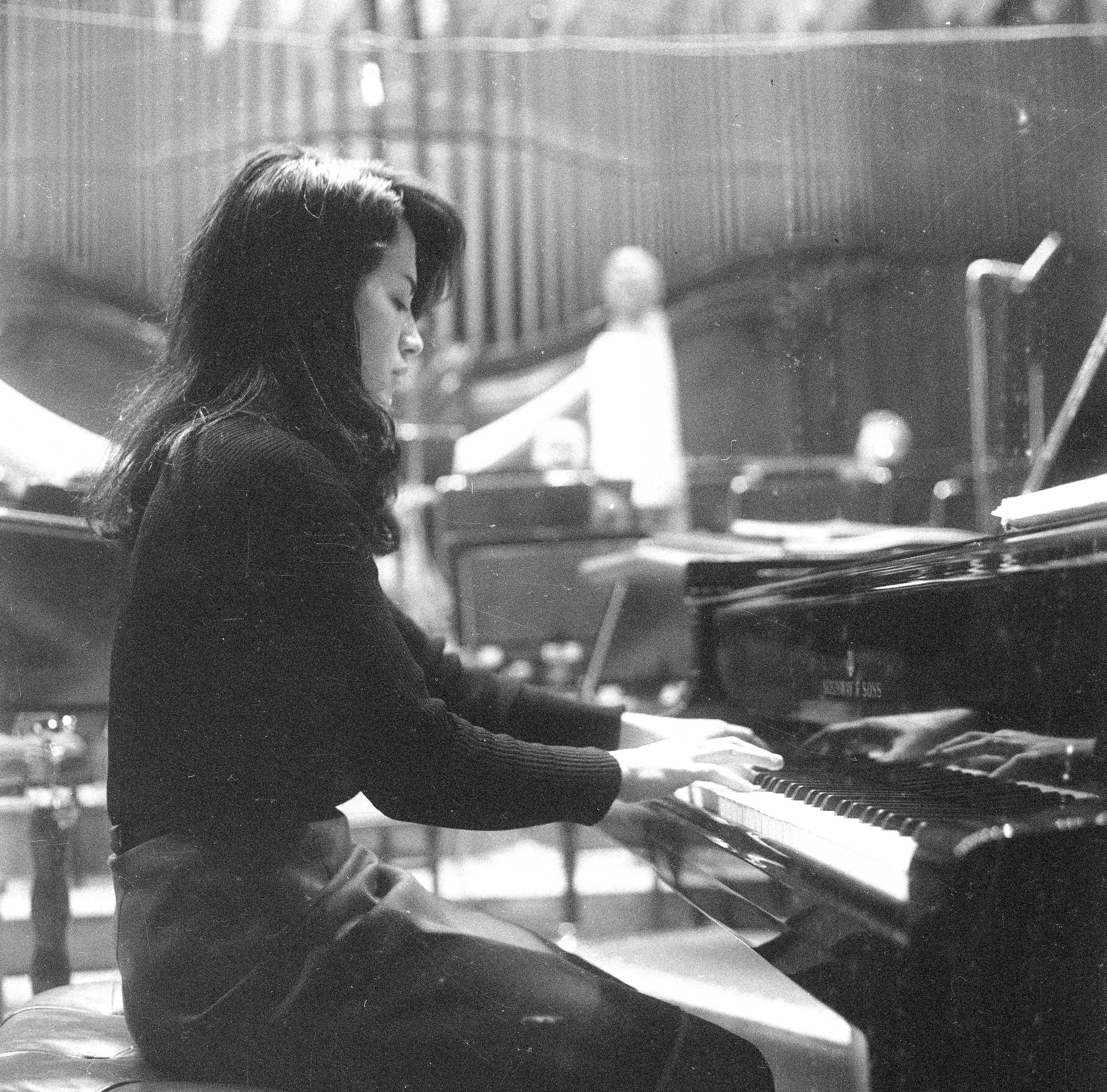
Argerich during a rehearsal with the orchestra for the final of the VII International Chopin Piano Competition, 1965

Argerich introduces herself, 2018

Argerich's first marriage was to composer-conductor Robert Chen (Chinese: 陈亮声; pinyin: Chén Liàngshēng), with whom she had her first child (viola player Lyda Chen-Argerich). The marriage was dissolved after several months in 1964. From 1969 to 1973, Argerich was married to Swiss conductor Charles Dutoit, with whom she had her second daughter, Annie Dutoit. After they separated in 1973 Argerich and Dutoit continued to collaborate. In the 1970s Argerich had a relationship with the American pianist Stephen Kovacevich, with whom she had her third daughter, Stéphanie. Although they made few recordings together during their relationship, Argerich and Kovacevich continued to perform together into the 21st century. Stéphanie Argerich explained in her film "Argerich – Bloody Daughter" that as her parents were not married, they tossed a coin to name their daughter and Argerich won the toss. Argerich brought her children up in a manner described by Annie Dutoit as "bohemian". She preferred her children to stay at home rather than go to school. She regularly hosted young musicians in her home and practised through the night. During the 1980s, Argerich was in a relationship with the French pianist Michel Béroff.

Argerich is a polyglot and speaks Spanish, French, Italian, German, English and Portuguese. Although her mother tongue is Spanish, she brought her children up speaking French. She has lived in Argentina, Belgium, Switzerland and France, and holds citizenship for Switzerland and Argentina.

Argerich has never been connected to a political party. She stated in a 2019 interview that she was strongly against capital punishment and admired the French politician Robert Badinter, who enacted the abolition of the death penalty in France. Her friend, the pianist Daniel Barenboim, stated that when he contacted the Argentine president Mauricio Macri in 2016 to ask him to accept Syrian refugees into the country, it was also on behalf of Argerich.

In 1990, Argerich was diagnosed with melanoma. After treatment the cancer went into remission, but it recurred in 1995 and metastasized to her lungs, pancreas, liver, brain and lymph nodes. Following an experimental treatment at the John Wayne Cancer Institute in Santa Monica pioneered by oncologist Donald Morton, Argerich's cancer went into remission again. In gratitude, Argerich performed a recital at Carnegie Hall to benefit the institute. As of 2023, Argerich remained cancer-free. In August 2023 she was forced to cancel several concerts in Germany and Switzerland because of an undisclosed illness. As of 2026 she had a full concert tour, with performances throughout Europe and beyond.

== Media ==
In 2002, director Georges Gachot released Martha Argerich: Conversation nocturne (Martha Argerich: Evening Talks), a documentary film about Argerich. Stéphanie Argerich Blagojevic, using film she had shot since childhood, directed a 2012 documentary film about her mother titled Bloody Daughter.

In September 2025 an interview with Argerich appeared on the YouTube podcast fortissimo, hosted by young Swiss pianists Lucas Chiche and David Chen Argerich, Argerich's grandson.

== Awards ==
- Ferruccio Busoni International Piano Competition: 1st prize (1957)
- Geneva International Music Competition: 1st prize (1957)
- VII International Chopin Piano Competition: 1st prize (1965)
- Claudio Arrau Memorial Medal (1997)
- Diamond Konex Award (1999) as the most important classical musician of the decade in Argentina
- Grammy Award for Best Instrumental Soloist(s) Performance (with orchestra):
  - Charles Dutoit (conductor), Martha Argerich, and the Montreal Symphony Orchestra for Prokofiev: Piano Concertos Nos. 1 and 3 / Bartók: Piano Concerto No. 3 (2000)
- Grammy Award for Best Chamber Music Performance:
  - Martha Argerich and Mikhail Pletnev for Prokofiev (Arr. Pletnev): Cinderella Suite for Two Pianos / Ravel: Ma mere l'Oye (2005)
- The Order of the Rising Sun, Gold Rays with Rosette (2005) Japan
- Praemium Imperiale (2005) Japan
- Grammy Award for Best Instrumental Soloist(s) Performance (with orchestra):
  - Claudio Abbado (conductor), Martha Argerich, and the Mahler Chamber Orchestra for Beethoven: Piano Concertos Nos. 2 and 3 (2006)
- Voted into Gramophone's Hall of Fame (2012)
- Recipient of The Kennedy Center Honors (2016)
- Recipient of Order of Merit of the Italian Republic (2018)
- Recipient of the National Order of the Legion of Honour (2023)
- Recipient of National Order of Faithful Service by the Romanian Presidency (2025)
- Main-belt asteroid 56067 Argerich named by the International Astronomical Union (2025)

== See also ==
- Great Pianists of the 20th Century – Martha Argerich
- Great Pianists of the 20th Century – Martha Argerich II
- List of Argentines
