= Piano Concerto No. 2 in B-flat major =

Piano Concerto No. 2 in B-flat Major may refer to:

- Piano Concerto No. 2 (Beethoven)
- Piano Concerto No. 2 (Brahms)
