= Piano Concerto No. 1 (Beethoven) =

Orchestral work by Ludwig van Beethoven

Piano Concerto in C major
- No. 1
- by Ludwig van Beethoven
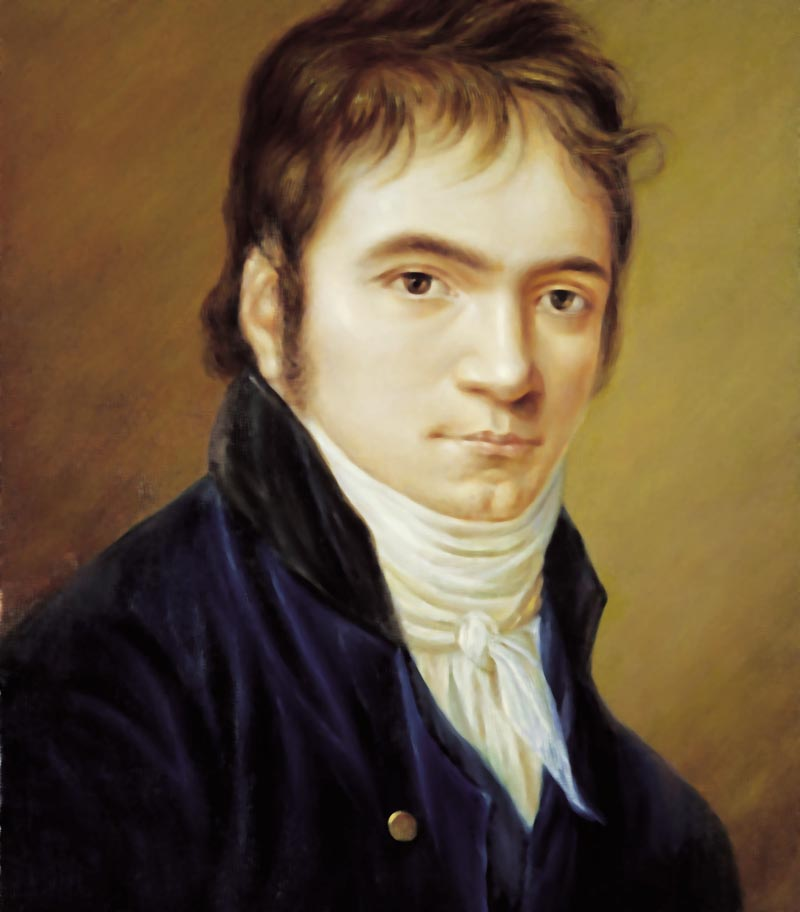
- Beethoven in 1803, six years after he completed the piano concerto, his third attempt in the genre
- Opus: 15
- Style: Classical period
- Dedication: Princess Anna Louise Barbara Odescalchi
- Performed: 18 December 1795; 230 years ago Vienna
- Published: 1801
- Movements: (Allegro con brio; Largo; Rondo. Allegro scherzando)
- Scoring: Piano; orchestra

Ludwig van Beethoven's Piano Concerto No. 1 in C major, Op. 15, was written in 1795, then revised in 1800. It was possibly first performed by Beethoven at his first public concert in Vienna on 29 March 1795. (Note: Evidence is unclear as to whether it was this concerto that was performed on that date or the Piano Concerto no. 2 op. 19 (actually written earlier than no. 1)) It was first published in 1801 in Vienna with dedication to his pupil Princess Anna Louise Barbara Odescalchi (née Countess von Keglević), known to her friends as "Babette".

Although this was Beethoven's first piano concerto to be published, it was actually his third attempt at the genre, following an unpublished piano concerto in E♭ major of 1784 and the Piano Concerto No. 2. The latter was published in 1801 in Leipzig after the Piano Concerto No. 1, but was composed over a period of years, perhaps beginning ca. 1788.

== Movements ==
The concerto has three movements:

1. Allegro con brio (C major)
2. Largo (A♭ major)
3. Rondo. Allegro scherzando (C major)

As with the Piano Concerto No. 2, this C major concerto reflects Beethoven's assimilation of the styles of Mozart and Haydn, while its abrupt harmonic shifts demonstrate Beethoven's musical personality. It adheres to the concerto variant of sonata form and is scored for solo piano and an orchestra consisting of flute, 2 oboes, 2 clarinets, 2 bassoons, 2 horns, 2 trumpets, timpani, and strings. The flute, oboes, trumpets, and timpani are tacet during the second movement.

=== I. Allegro con brio ===
I. Allegro con brio

Tempo: = 144

The first movement is in sonata form, but with an added orchestral exposition, a cadenza, and a coda. It has a main theme with its motifs repeated many times, and a more lyrical second theme. In the orchestral exposition, the second theme changes its keys many times, but mainly in G major for the second exposition. The development starts in E♭ major, then modulates to C minor for the retransition, which ends with an octave glissando. The recapitulation is entirely in C major.

There are three options for the cadenza to this movement, which vary in length and difficulty. The coda is played by the orchestra alone. Performances vary in length from fourteen to eighteen minutes.

=== II. Largo ===
II. Largo

The second movement is in the key of A♭ major, in this context a key relatively remote from the concerto's opening key of C major. If the movement adhered to traditional form, its key would be F major, the subdominant key, or in G major, the dominant key. The clarinets are given an unusually prominent role in this movement, having the melody as often as violins.

Like many slow movements, this movement is in ternary (ABA) form. Its opening A section presents several themes that are then developed in the middle B section.

Typical performances last more than ten minutes

=== III. Rondo. Allegro scherzando ===
III. Rondo. Allegro scherzando
All three movements performed by Aaron Dunn with the Bucharest College Orchestra

The third movement is a seven-part sonata rondo (ABACABA), a traditional third-movement form in classical concerti. The piano states the main theme, which is then repeated by the orchestra. The two B sections (subordinate themes) are in G major and C major respectively. The middle section is in A minor.

Two short cadenzas are indicated by Beethoven in this movement, one just before the final return to the main theme, and another one immediately before the end of the movement, which finishes with a striking dynamic contrast; the piano plays a melody quietly, but the orchestra then ends the movement forcefully.

The movement typically lasts around eight to nine minutes.

=== Alternative cadenzas ===
German pianist Wilhelm Kempff wrote his own cadenzas for both the first and last movements and played these in his various recordings of the work. Canadian pianist Glenn Gould also wrote his own cadenza, which was published by Barger and Barclay, and recorded for EMI in 1996 by Lars Vogt with the City of Birmingham Symphony Orchestra under Simon Rattle

== Recordings ==
Year	Soloist	Conductor	Orchestra	Label	Catalogue number
1954	Friedrich Wuhrer	Hans Swarovsky	Pro Musica Vienna	Vox	
1958	Glenn Gould	Vladimir Golschmann	Columbia Symphony Orchestra	Columbia Masterworks	
1959	Wilhelm Backhaus	Hans Schmidt-Isserstedt	Vienna Philharmonic	Decca	
1961	Leon Fleisher	George Szell	Cleveland Orchestra	Columbia	
1961	Sviatoslav Richter	Charles Munch	Boston Symphony Orchestra	RCA Victor Red Seal	
1962	Wilhelm Kempff	Ferdinand Leitner	Berlin Philharmonic	DGG	
1965	Julius Katchen	Piero Gamba	London Symphony Orchestra	Decca	
1968	Artur Rubinstein	Erich Leinsdorf	Boston Symphony Orchestra	RCA Victor Red Seal	
1970	Stephen Kovacevich	Sir Colin Davis	London Symphony Orchestra	Philips	
1970	Friedrich Gulda	Horst Stein	Vienna Philharmonic	Decca	
1973	Vladimir Ashkenazy	Sir Georg Solti	Chicago Symphony Orchestra	Decca	
1975	Alfred Brendel	Bernard Haitink	Royal Concertgebouw Orchestra	Philips	
1979	Arturo Benedetti Michelangeli	Carlo Maria Giulini	Wiener Symphoniker	DGG	
1983	Alicia de Larrocha	Riccardo Chailly	RSO Berlin	Decca	
1984	Alfred Brendel	James Levine	Chicago Symphony Orchestra	Philips	
1984	Claudio Arrau	Sir Colin Davis	Staatskapelle Dresden	Philips	
1984	Vladimir Ashkenazy	Zubin Mehta	Vienna Philharmonic	Decca	
1985	Martha Argerich	Giuseppe Sinopoli	Philharmonia Orchestra	DGG	
1987	Steven Lubin	Christopher Hogwood	Academy of Ancient Music	L'Oiseau-Lyre	
1988	Vladimir Ashkenazy	Vladimir Ashkenazy	Cleveland Orchestra	Decca	
1992	Krystian Zimerman	Leonard Bernstein	Vienna Philharmonic	DGG	
1992	Maurizio Pollini	Claudio Abbado	Berlin Philharmonic	Deutsche Grammophon	
1997	Mitsuko Uchida	Kurt Sanderling	Bavarian Radio Symphony Orchestra	Philips	
1998	Alfred Brendel	Sir Simon Rattle	Vienna Philharmonic	Philips	
2002	Pierre-Laurent Aimard	Nikolaus Harnoncourt	Chamber Orchestra of Europe	Warner Classics	
2005	Yefim Bronfman	David Zinman	Tonhalle-Orchester Zürich	Sony	
2017	Lars Vogt	Lars Vogt	Royal Northern Sinfonia	Ondine	ODE1292-2
2018	Jan Lisiecki	Jan Lisiecki	Academy of St. Martin in the Fields	DGG	
2019	Boris Giltburg	Vasily Petrenko	Royal Liverpool Philharmonic	Naxos	
2020	Elizabeth Sombart	Pierre Vallet	Royal Philharmonic Orchestra	Signum	SIGCD614
2020	András Schiff	Bernard Haitink	Staatskapelle Dresden	Warner Classics	9029531753
2020	Stewart Goodyear	Andrew Constantine	BBC National Orchestra of Wales	Orchid Classics	ORC100127
2022	Kristian Bezuidenhout	Pablo Heras-Casado	Freiburger Barockorchester	harmonia mundi	HMM902412
