= Great Pianists of the 20th Century =

1999 box set by various artists

Great Pianists of the 20th Century – Complete Edition

Box set by Various artists
- Released: July 20, 1999
- Recorded: various
- Genre: Classical
- Length: 200 CDs
- Label: Philips
- Producer: Tom Deacon

Great Pianists of the 20th Century was a 200-CD box set released by Philips Records in 1999 and sponsored by Steinway & Sons.

The box set comprises 100 volumes featuring 72 pianists of the 20th century, each volume with two CDs and a booklet about the life and work of the featured pianist. The set contains a variety of composers from different eras, from Baroque to Contemporary classical. The material was the result of a collaborative association between Philips (who had access to the Polygram Records back catalogue) and a number of other labels, notably EMI Classics, as no single label possessed a representative set of recordings for every pianist considered to be significant. Material from Warner Classics and Sony Classics was also used.

The majority of the pianists feature on one set only, with sixteen appearing on a second set (set number 8, dedicated to Wilhelm Backhaus, is titled "Wilhelm Backhaus I", which suggests that a second set was planned at some point but never published, and the set dedicated to Daniel Barenboim is correctly numbered as number 9). Seven artists (Arrau, Brendel, Gilels, Horowitz, Kempff, Richter and Rubinstein) are featured across three sets. The nature and size of the project meant that popular works (such as Beethoven's Emperor Concerto, Prokofiev's Third Piano Concerto and Rachmaninov's Rhapsody on a Theme of Paganini, and other solo pieces) appear several times.

Perceptive pianophiles have pointed out various errors in the set, including misattributed recordings and use of unauthorized takes. For example, the Paderewski volume contains a performance of Liszt’s "La Leggierezza" which was actually recorded by Benno Moiseiwitsch – also included in the latter’s volume. Further, the liner notes claim the cadenza of the piece was by Moiseiwitsch, while it was actually by Theodor Leschetizky. The first of two Cortot volumes was withdrawn when it was discovered that a previously rejected performance of Schumann’s Kreisleriana was issued by mistake. The volume was reissued with the correct take. The series has also been criticized for the lack of remastering of historic recordings, notably in the Hofmann reissue which degraded the transfers originally issued by Ward Marston.

The German edition of the set (and possibly others) includes a bonus CD with Clara Haskil (Sonderausgabe zur Edition) —raising to 5 the total number of CDs with her. This bonus CD contains her interpretation of some of Scarlatti's piano sonatas from her 1947 Westminster LP, and is the first printing on CD of these recordings, according to the CD cover (Erstveröffentlichung auf CD).

== List of volumes ==
Each volume contains two CDs.

1. Géza Anda
2. Martha Argerich
3. Martha Argerich II
4. Claudio Arrau
5. Claudio Arrau II
6. Claudio Arrau III
7. Vladimir Ashkenazy
8. Wilhelm Backhaus
9. Daniel Barenboim
10. Jorge Bolet
11. Jorge Bolet II
12. Alfred Brendel
13. Alfred Brendel II
14. Alfred Brendel III
15. Lyubov Bruk & Mark Taimanov
16. Robert Casadesus
17. Shura Cherkassky
18. Shura Cherkassky II
19. Van Cliburn
20. Alfred Cortot
21. Alfred Cortot II
22. Clifford Curzon
23. Gyorgy Cziffra
24. Christoph Eschenbach
25. Edwin Fischer
26. Edwin Fischer II
27. Leon Fleisher
28. Samson François
29. Nelson Freire
30. Ignaz Friedman
31. Andrei Gavrilov
32. Walter Gieseking
33. Walter Gieseking II
34. Emil Gilels
35. Emil Gilels II
36. Emil Gilels III
37. Grigory Ginsburg
38. Leopold Godowsky
39. Glenn Gould
40. Friedrich Gulda
41. Friedrich Gulda II
42. Ingrid Haebler
43. Clara Haskil
44. Clara Haskil II
45. Myra Hess
46. Josef Hofmann
47. Vladimir Horowitz
48. Vladimir Horowitz II
49. Vladimir Horowitz III
50. Byron Janis
51. Byron Janis II
52. William Kapell
53. Julius Katchen
54. Julius Katchen II
55. Wilhelm Kempff
56. Wilhelm Kempff II
57. Wilhelm Kempff III
58. Evgeny Kissin
59. Zoltán Kocsis
60. Stephen Kovacevich
61. Stephen Kovacevich II
62. Alicia de Larrocha
63. Alicia de Larrocha II
64. Josef & Rosina Lhévinne
65. Dinu Lipatti
66. Radu Lupu
67. Nikita Magaloff
68. Arturo Benedetti Michelangeli
69. Arturo Benedetti Michelangeli II
70. Benno Moiseiwitsch
71. Ivan Moravec
72. John Ogdon
73. John Ogdon II
74. Ignacy Jan Paderewski
75. Murray Perahia
76. Maria João Pires
77. Mikhail Pletnev
78. Maurizio Pollini
79. Maurizio Pollini II
80. André Previn
81. Sergei Rachmaninoff
82. Sviatoslav Richter
83. Sviatoslav Richter II
84. Sviatoslav Richter III
85. Arthur Rubinstein
86. Arthur Rubinstein II
87. Arthur Rubinstein III
88. András Schiff
89. Artur Schnabel
90. Rudolf Serkin
91. Vladimir Sofronitsky
92. Solomon
93. Rosalyn Tureck
94. Rosalyn Tureck II
95. Mitsuko Uchida
96. André Watts
97. Alexis Weissenberg
98. Earl Wild
99. Maria Yudina
100. Krystian Zimerman
