= Great Pianists of the 20th Century – Alfred Brendel III =

Great Pianists of the 20th Century - Alfred Brendel III

Compilation album by Alfred Brendel
- Released: 1999
- Recorded: various
- Genre: Classical
- Length: 148:53
- Label: Philips Classics
- Producer: Tom Deacon

Great Pianists of the 20th Century - Alfred Brendel III is volume 14 of the Great Pianists of the 20th Century box set and is the third of three volumes dedicated to him. It features music by the composers Felix Mendelssohn, Carl Maria von Weber, Johannes Brahms, Frédéric Chopin, Franz Liszt, and Ferruccio Busoni. It was issued in CD format in 1999.

== Critical reception ==
The album was selected as one of the highlights of the 200-CD series by Rob Cowan of the Gramophone. He was particularly pleased with the 1986 live recording of Brahms Piano Concerto No. 1 with Claudio Abbado and the Berlin Philharmonic, and described Brendel's rendition of Vallée d'Obermann as "one of the most inspired of his Liszt recordings."

It was also reviewed by Peter Burwasser in Fanfare. This critic was less pleased with the Brahms concerto recording, saying "this Brahms performance is a contrast of the straightforward, unsentimental, yet fully engaged and powerfully expressed playing of Brendel with the thick, bloated sound of the Berlin Philharmonic under Abbado." He much preferred Bernard Haitink's conducting in Liszt's Totentanz. He also notes that "Brendel's Chopin doesn't really work, although it is fascinating to hear what he makes of this music. This Chopin playing, even in one of the big polonaises, is too brusque and rhythmically unyielding, even as it is emotionally honest and bristling with energy."

== Track listing ==
All tracks are reissues from Philips Classics Records unless otherwise noted.

Compact Disc 1		76:31
Felix Mendelssohn:
1.	Variations sérieuses, Op. 54	10:32
	(Recorded: The Maltings Snape, UK; July 1989)
Carl Maria von Weber:
	Konzertstück in F minor, Op. 79
2.	Larghetto affettuoso – Allegro passionato –	9:51
3.	Adagio – Tempo di Marcia – Più mosso – Presto giocoso	7:32
	London Symphony Orchestra; Claudio Abbado, conducting
	(Recorded: Town Hall, Watford, UK; June 1979)
Johannes Brahms:
	Piano Concerto No. 1 in D minor, Op. 15
4.	1. Maestoso – Poco più moderato	22:39
5.	2. Adagio	13:46
6.	3. Allegro non troppo	12:11
	Berliner Philharmoniker; Claudio Abbado, conducting
	(Recorded: Jesus-Christus-Kirche, Berlin; September 1986)
Compact Disc 2		72:22
Frédéric Chopin:
1.	Polonaise in F-sharp minor, Op. 44	11:22
	(Recorded: April 1968; from Vanguard Classics, 1991)
Franz Liszt:
2.	Vallée d'Obermann	12:48
	No. 6 from Années de Pèlerinage: Première année: Suisse
	(Recorded live: Concertgebouw, Amsterdam; 1981)
3.	Orage	4:17
	No. 5 from Années de Pèlerinage: Première année: Suisse
	(Recorded: Walthamstow, London; October 1986)
4.	Totentanz	15:26
	London Philharmonic Orchestra; Bernard Haitink, conducting
	(Recorded: Walthamstow, London; May 1972)
5.	Sposalizio	6:43
	No. 1 from Années de Pèlerinage: Deuxième année: Italie
	(Recorded live: Queen Elizabeth Hall, London; 1972; from BBC Records, 1985)
6.	Bagatelle sans tonalité	2:33
	(Recorded live: Queen Elizabeth Hall, London; 1972; from BBC Records, 1985)
7.	Hungarian Rhapsody No. 15 in A minor "Rakoczy March"	5:33
	(From Vanguard Classics, 1992)
8.	La lugubre gondola No. 1	4:16
	(Recorded: Town Hall, Watford, UK; June 1981)
Ferruccio Busoni:
9.	Toccata	9:24
	Preludio – Fantasia – Ciaccona
	(Recorded live: Großer Konzerthaussaal, Vienna; 1979)

== See also ==
- Alfred Brendel discography
- Alfred Brendel – Unpublished Live and Radio Performances 1968–2001
