= Gabriele Baldocci =

Italian-British pianist and composer (born 1980)

- Gabriele Baldocci, photographed in 2026

Background information
- Born: 10 May 1980 (age 46); Livorno, Italy
- Genres: Classical; contemporary classical; neoclassical
- Occupations: Pianist; composer; teacher
- Instrument: Piano
- Years active: 2000–present
- Labels: Dynamic; MKMA Records; Bad Elephant Music
- Website: gabrielebaldocci.com

Gabriele Baldocci (born 10 May 1980 in Livorno, Italy) is an Italian-born pianist and composer who is a naturalised British citizen. He is known internationally for his concert partnership with the pianist Martha Argerich and for his recordings of Liszt's solo-piano transcriptions of the Beethoven symphonies. As a composer he describes his music as "genre-neutral", rooted in the classical tradition while moving freely across styles.

== Early life and education ==
Baldocci was born in Livorno in 1980 into a working-class, non-musical family; his father, a music lover with a large record collection, had wanted to become a pianist and bought the household's first piano. He began playing by ear as a small child and started formal lessons at the age of six. From the age of seven he was affected by the autoimmune kidney disease IgA nephropathy, which kept him hospitalised and largely housebound for several years, a period in which, by his own account, music became his principal occupation.

After early studies at a local music school in Livorno with Ilio Barontini, in 1995 he won a place at the Accademia Internazionale "Incontri col Maestro" in Imola, where he studied with Franco Scala until 1999. From 2000 to around 2005 he studied at the International Piano Foundation "Theo Lieven" in Cadenabbia on Lake Como, working with William Grant Naboré and being coached by Alicia de Larrocha, Leon Fleisher, Fou Ts'ong and Dmitri Bashkirov; he has cited the tradition of Artur Schnabel, transmitted through Fleisher and Claude Frank, as central to his formation. He completed his training in 2008 with a diploma from the Accademia Nazionale di Santa Cecilia in Rome under Sergio Perticaroli, graduating with top marks.

== Career ==
=== Partnership with Martha Argerich ===
In 2003 Baldocci took part in the second edition of the Martha Argerich International Piano Competition in Buenos Aires, where he received a special honourable mention and met Argerich. She invited him to join her on a tour of Argentina, on which he played Beethoven's Fourth Piano Concerto and the two first shared a stage as a duo in an encore; they went on to perform together frequently, Argerich becoming, in his words, a friend and mentor. He has since appeared at festivals including the Progetto Martha Argerich in Lugano and, in 2010, became artistic director and ambassador of the Martha Argerich Presents Project (MAPp), an initiative to pair established artists with young musicians.

=== Beethoven–Liszt symphony cycle ===
Beethoven has been a lifelong preoccupation for Baldocci, and in 2012 he began recording and performing Liszt's solo-piano transcriptions of the complete Beethoven symphonies. Three volumes have been released on the Dynamic label, distributed internationally by Naxos; the cycle is ongoing. He has performed from the cycle in concert at venues including the Beethoven Festival in Chicago and (Le) Poisson Rouge in New York, where he made his New York debut in 2012.

=== Collaborations ===
Baldocci has worked widely as a chamber musician, performing with Ivry Gitlis, Mischa Maisky, Nicholas Angelich and the violinist and violist Marco Fornaciari, with whom he recorded the complete works for violin and piano and for viola and piano by Nino Rota (Arts, 2007), and appearing with conductors including Charles Dutoit. Since 2008 he has maintained a long-standing piano duo with the Argentine pianist Daniel Rivera, in addition to his duo with Argerich.

He has also collaborated outside the classical field. In 2016 he played keyboards and co-wrote material on Why the Sea Is Salt (released 28 October 2016, Bad Elephant Music) by the English progressive rock band The Gift, returning on their 2019 album Antenna. With Anthony Phillips, a founding member of Genesis, he created the two-piano piece Gemini, which he premiered with Argerich at the Palau de la Música Catalana in Barcelona in 2018. He also contributed to the Israeli songwriter Asaf Avidan's album In a Box III: Acoustic Recordings (2023), working with Avidan on piano-and-string-quartet arrangements of songs including "Reckoning Song".

=== Work as a composer ===
Baldocci began composing and improvising as a child and returned to composition as a recording artist in the 2020s. His first album as a pianist-composer, Ageless (2023), is built around the theme of the passing of time and is dedicated to the Italian composer Ezio Bosso; its title track, released on 12 September 2023, became one of his best-known pieces, with a video filmed at the Terrazza Mascagni in Livorno and directed by Anton Giulio Onofri. His later album Faded Gardens (2026) draws on his childhood experience of illness and isolation.

== Musical style ==
Baldocci's concert repertoire ranges from Bach to contemporary music, with a particular focus on the Romantic composers—Frédéric Chopin (whose complete Ballades and Impromptus he has recorded), Liszt and Robert Schumann. As a composer and performer he describes his aesthetic as "genre-neutral": rooted in classical music but deliberately crossing stylistic boundaries, and his recitals often combine improvisation and his own works with classical and non-classical repertoire.

== Critical reception ==
Baldocci's Beethoven–Liszt recordings have been well received. Writing for Gramophone and ClassicsToday, the critic Jed Distler described him as "a pianist of formidable capabilities" and judged the early volumes of the cycle to augur well for the complete set. In MusicWeb International, the reviewer Byzantion praised his solutions to the problems of rendering orchestral textures on the piano as ranging "from the inspired to the miraculous". A review of his 2012 New York debut was more mixed, noting interpretive ambition alongside some technical unevenness. The Italian television channel Sky Classica has dedicated a monographic documentary portrait to him, Notevoli.

== Teaching ==
Baldocci taught at the Potenza Conservatory of Music from 2008 to 2016, and has been a professor of piano at Trinity Laban Conservatoire of Music and Dance in London since 2011. He was head of keyboard at Haileybury from 2021 to 2024. In 2021 he founded the London Piano Centre, and he directs the Milton Keynes Music Academy, which received several regional business awards.

== Film ==
Baldocci has a longstanding interest in cinema and has directed several short films, among them Bloopers. He has also occasionally worked as a conductor.

== Personal life ==
Baldocci is based in the United Kingdom and was naturalised as a British citizen in 2022, together with his wife, Nagore, and their son, Alessandro.

== Discography ==
=== As principal artist ===
- Nino Rota: Complete Works for Violin and Piano / Viola and Piano (Arts, 2007)
- Liszt–Beethoven: The Complete Symphonies, Vol. 1 (Dynamic, 2012)
- Works for Two Pianos (Dynamic, 2013)
- Liszt–Beethoven: The Complete Symphonies, Vol. 2 (Dynamic, 2017)
- Le opere per pianoforte a quattro mani (Tactus, 2020)
- Chamber Music (Da Vinci Classics, 2023)
- Liszt–Beethoven: The Complete Symphonies, Vol. 3 (Dynamic, 2023)
- Ageless (The Cage, 2023)
- Schumann: Carnaval, Op. 9 (MKMA Records, 2024)
- Faded Gardens (2026)

=== With The Gift ===
- Why the Sea Is Salt (Bad Elephant Music, 2016)
- Antenna (Bad Elephant Music, 2019)

=== Selected appearances ===
- Progetto Martha Argerich, Lugano 2007 (EMI Classics, 2007)
- Asaf Avidan, In a Box III: Acoustic Recordings (2023)
