= Glissando =

Glide between pitches

Notated glissando from E_{4} to E_{5}

In music, a glissando (Italian: [ɡlisˈsando]; plural: glissandi, abbreviated gliss.) is a glide from one pitch to another (example). It is an Italianized musical term derived from the French glisser, "to glide". In some contexts, it is equivalent to portamento, which is a continuous, seamless glide between notes. In other contexts, it refers to discrete, stepped glides across notes, such as on a piano. Some terms that are similar or equivalent in some contexts are slide, sweep bend, smear, rip (for a loud, violent glissando to the beginning of a note), lip (in jazz terminology, when executed by changing one's embouchure on a wind instrument), plop, or falling hail (a glissando on a harp using the back of the fingernails). On wind instruments, a scoop is a glissando ascending to the onset of a note achieved entirely with the embouchure, except on instruments that have a slide (such as a trombone).

== Notation ==
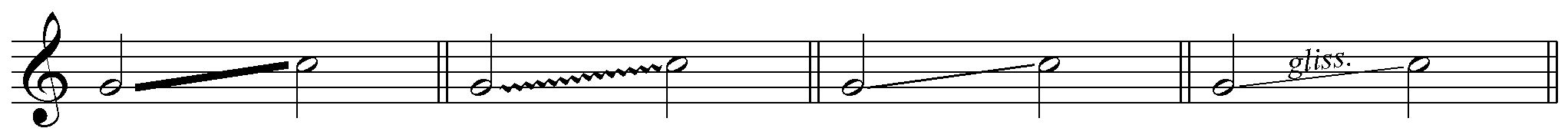
Several examples of the musical notation of glissando

The glissando is indicated by following the initial note with a line, sometimes wavy, in the desired direction, often accompanied by the abbreviation gliss.. Occasionally, the desired notes are notated in the standard method (i.e. semiquavers) accompanied by the word 'glissando'.

== Discrete glissando ==
On some instruments (e.g., piano, harp, xylophone), discrete tones are clearly audible when sliding. For example, on a keyboard, a player's fingernails can be made to slide across the white keys or over the black keys, producing either a C major scale or an F♯ major pentatonic scale, or their relative modes; by performing both at once, it is possible to produce a full chromatic scale. Maurice Ravel used glissandi in many of his piano compositions, and "Alborada del Gracioso" contains notable piano glissando passages in thirds executed by the right hand. Rachmaninoff, Prokofiev, Liszt and Gershwin have all used glissandi for piano in notable compositions.

Organ players—particularly in contemporary music—sometimes employ an effect known as the palm glissando, where over the course of the glissando the flat of the hand is used to depress a wide area of keys simultaneously, resulting in a dramatic atonal sweep.

A similar device on the piano is cluster-glissandos, used extensively by Karlheinz Stockhausen in Klavierstück X, and which "more than anything else, lend the work its unique aural flavour". On a harp, the player can slide their finger across the strings, quickly playing the scale (or on pedal harp even arpeggios such as C♭–D–E♯–F–G♯–A♭–B). Wind, brass, and fretted-stringed-instrument players can perform an extremely rapid chromatic scale (e.g., sliding up or down a string quickly on a fretted instrument).

Arpeggio effects (likewise named glissando) are also obtained by bowed strings (playing harmonics) and brass, especially the horn.

== Continuous glissando ==
A trombone playing a glissando

Musical instruments with continuously variable pitch are capable of continuous glissando, sometimes called portamento, over a substantial range. These include unfretted chordophones (such as the violin, viola, cello and double bass, and fretless guitars), stringed instruments with a way of stretching the strings (such as the guitar, veena, sitar or pipa), a fretted guitar or lap steel guitar when accompanied with the use of a slide, wind instruments without valves or stops (such as the trombone or slide whistle), timpani (kettledrums), electronic instruments (such as the theremin, the ondes Martenot, synthesizers and keytars), the water organ, the musical saw, and the human voice.

Wind instruments can effect a similar limited slide by altering the lip pressure (on trumpet, for example) or a combination of embouchure and rolling the head joint (as on the flute), while others such as the clarinet can achieve this by slowly dragging fingers off tone holes or changing the oral cavity's resonance by manipulating tongue position, embouchure, and throat shaping.

Many electric guitars are fitted with a tremolo arm which can produce either a portamento, a vibrato, or a combination of both (but not a true tremolo despite the name).

Prescriptive attempts to distinguish the glissando from the portamento by limiting the former to discrete, stepped glides conflict with established usage of the term for instruments like the trombone and timpani. The clarinet gesture that opens Rhapsody in Blue was originally notated as a stepped glissando (Gershwin's score labels each individual note) but is in practice played as a portamento.

== Bent note ==
A bent note is a musical note that is varied in pitch. With unfretted strings or other continuous-pitch instruments such as the trombone, or with the human voice, such variation is more properly described in terms of intonation. A note is commonly bent to a higher pitch on fretted instruments literally by bending the string with excess finger pressure, and to a lower pitch on harmonica (a free-reed aerophone) by altering the vocal tract to shift the resonance of the reed. On brass instruments such as the trumpet, the note is bent by using the lip. "Indeterminately pitched instruments [such as unpitched percussion instruments and friction drum rolls]...produce a pitch or pitch spectrum that becomes higher with an increase of dynamic and lower with a decrease of dynamic."

The bent note is commonly found in various forms of jazz, blues, and rock.

== See also ==
- String bending
- Bend (guitar)
- Blue note
- Deep Note
- Fretless guitar
- Fretless bass
- Blues scale
- List of ornaments
- Meend
- Octave glissando
- Portamento
- Shepard tone (cf. Shepard-Risset glissando)
- Staccato
- Vibrato
