= Octave glissando =

Piano note sequence

An octave glissando is a glissando played on the piano by maintaining a constant distance of an octave between the thumb and finger used to execute it, and shifting the whole hand in the direction of the glissando.

Due to the positions of the thumbs on the player's hands, octave glissandos are almost always executed upwards with the left hand and downwards with the right. However, exceptions include Balakirev's Islamey, where players are instructed to execute the glissando upwards across three octaves with their right hands in the Tempo di Trepak section.

Due to the slight damage (and resultant pain) which octave glissandi may cause to the flesh of the fifth finger, they are infrequently used in the piano repertoire. However, their inclusion offers a rare and unique musical effect.

== Examples ==
Pieces which utilise the effect include:

- Ludwig van Beethoven: Piano Concerto No. 1 in C major
- Ludwig van Beethoven: Piano Sonata No. 21 (third movement)
- Carl Maria von Weber: Konzertstück in F minor.
- Johannes Brahms: Variations on a Theme of Paganini.
- Mily Balakirev: Islamey
- Johann Nepomuk Hummel: Piano Concerto No. 2 in A minor
- Igor Stravinsky: Three Movements from Petrushka
- Georges Cziffra: Fantasy on William Tell; La Fantaisie Roumaine
- Eduard Künneke: Piano Concerto No. 1
- Marc-André Hamelin: Cadenza for Liszt's Second Hungarian Rhapsody
- Sophie Carmen Eckhardt-Gramatté: Piano Sonata No. 1
- Franz Liszt: Romancero Espagnol, S.695c; Mélodies hongroises d'après Schubert, S.425/2i

== Injuries ==
Due to the nature of this technique, over-practicing without awareness can lead to injury, which includes superficial wounds, bruises and tendinitis.

== Variations ==
One-handed double glissandi are sometimes executed at intervals other than an octave, the most common being sixths. Franz Liszt's piano transcription of Hector Berlioz's Symphonie fantastique contains, in an ossia (optional replacement measure) in the finale, a glissando in sixths played upward with the right hand. The Alborada del gracioso from Maurice Ravel's Miroirs contains glissandi in thirds and fourths in one hand.
