= Great Pianists of the 20th Century – Géza Anda =

1999 compilation album

Great Pianists of the 20th Century - Géza Anda

Compilation album by Géza Anda
- Released: July 20, 1999
- Recorded: at Berlin and Salzburg
- Genre: Classical
- Length: 2:47:04
- Label: Polygram
- Producer: Tom Deacon

Great Pianists of the 20th Century – Géza Anda is volume one of the Great Pianists of the 20th Century box set, and it features music by the composers Béla Bartók, Frédéric Chopin, and Wolfgang Amadeus Mozart performed by the renowned pianist, Géza Anda.

Included from Anda's catalogue are his performance of Mozart's Piano Concerto #21, popularly known as the theme of Elvira Madigan, his "idiomatic" performance of Bartók's Piano Concertos, and Chopin's Waltzes which were recorded near the end of Anda's life.

== Featured works ==
Béla Bartók
Piano Concerto No. 1 in A major, Sz. 83, BB 91±
Piano Concerto No. 2 in G major, Sz. 95, BB 101±
Piano Concerto No. 3 in E major, Sz. 119, BB 127±

Frédéric Chopin
Waltz No. 1 in E flat major, Op. 18 'Grande Valse brillante'
Waltz No. 1 in A flat major, Op. 34 'Valse brillante'
Waltz No. 2 in A minor, Op. 34
Waltz No. 3 in F major, Op. 34 'Valse brillante'
Waltz in A flat major, Op. 42 'Grande Valse'
Waltz No. 1 in D flat major, Op. 64 'Minute'
Waltz No. 2 in C sharp minor, Op. 64
Waltz No. 3 in A flat major, Op. 64
Waltz No. 1 in A flat major, Op. 69 'L'adieu'
Waltz No. 2 in B minor, Op. 69
Waltz No. 1 in G flat major, Op. 70
Waltz No. 2 in F minor, Op. 70
Waltz No. 3 in D flat major, Op. 70

Wolfgang Amadeus Mozart
Piano Concerto No. 21 in C major, K. 467 'Elvira Madigan'±±

± Berlin RSO conducted by Ferenc Fricsay
±± Salzburg Mozart Camerata Academica conducted by Géza Anda

== Track listing ==
=== Disc 1 ===
1. "Allegro moderato" – 9:09
2. "Andante" – 8:36
3. "Allegro molto" – 7:13
4. "Allegro" – 9:45
5. "Adagio - Più adagio - Presto" – 12:14
6. "Allegro molto" – 6:12
7. "Allegretto" – 7:08
8. "Adagio religioso" – 10:18
9. "Allegro vivace" – 6:46
10. "Allegro" – 13:48
11. "Andante" – 7:10
12. "Allegro vivace assai" – 6:22

=== Disc 2 ===
1. "Waltz in E flat, Op. 18 'Grande Valse brillante" – 5:58
2. "Waltz in A flat, Op. 34 No. 1 'Valse brillante'" - 6:12
3. "Waltz in A minor, Op. 34 No. 2" - 5:45
4. "Waltz in F, Op. 34 No. 3" - 2:45
5. "Waltz in A flat, Op. 42 'Grande Valse'" - 4:26
6. "Waltz in D flat, Op. 64 No. 1 'Minute'" - 2:05
7. "Waltz in C sharp minor, Op. 64 No. 2" - 3:45
8. "Waltz in A flat, Op. 64 No. 3" - 3:31
9. "Waltz in A flat, Op. 69 No. 1 'Farewell'" - 3:41
10. "Waltz in B minor, Op. 69 No. 2" - 3:45
11. "Waltz in G flat, Op. 70 No. 1" - 2:20
12. "Waltz in F minor/A flat, Op. 70 No. 2" - 1:45
13. "Waltz in D flat, Op. 70 No. 3" - 2:35
