= Alfred Brendel – Unpublished Live and Radio Performances 1968–2001 =

Compilation album by Alfred Brendel
- Released: 2007
- Recorded: 1968–2001
- Genre: Classical
- Length: 113:38
- Label: Philips
- Producer: Various

Alfred Brendel – Unpublished Live and Radio Performances 1968–2001 is a 2-CD compilation album of solo piano music selected by the performer Alfred Brendel. The album was released in 2007 and features music by the composers Ludwig van Beethoven, Frédéric Chopin, Felix Mendelssohn, and Ferruccio Busoni.

== Critical reception ==
This album was reviewed by Peter Burwasser in Fanfare. He points out that these selections do not represent career highlights, such as Brendel's recordings of Mozart and Schubert, rather they are "performances of music close to the artist’s heart that contain the spontaneity and warmth of the live music-making experience." He goes on to say that no one else plays the Diabelli Variations better than Brendel, and that this performance, "if a shade lower in temperature and energy than the 1988 studio version, is richer and more dynamically pointed." Regarding the Beethoven Piano Sonata No. 28, Op. 101: "I share the common criticism of Brendel that he can be too cool emotionally, but you could not ascribe that character to this jubilant performance. Here is Brendel at his glorious best, which is to say, about as good as it gets." He goes on to give the Mendelssohn Variations very high marks, and of the Busoni he says Brendel "finds the slithering dark corners of this fascinating material."

The album was also reviewed by Bryce Morrison in the Gramophone. Morrison says "here is Brendel at his greatest" presenting "the ultimate or definitive musical statement." He gives very high praise to the Beethoven Diabelli Variations and the Op. 101 Sonata, and says Brendel "declares his love of Busoni's austere genius in every bar of Elegies Nos. 3 and 6 while Mendelssohn's Variations sérieuses are given with unflagging musical energy." He goes on to say that Chopin's Andante spianato et Grande Polonaise brillante is "a delicious surprise, the Andante played with the most simple and refined eloquence, the Polonaise given with a gentle and idiosyncratic charm – the reverse of other more superficial, show-stopping performances."

== Track listing ==
All tracks are BBC Radio recordings.

Compact Disc 1 (475 8323)			55:46
	Ludwig van Beethoven:
	33 Variations in C major on a waltz by Anton Diabelli, Op. 120
1.	Tema: Vivace – Variation 1: Alla marcia maestoso		2:36
2.	Variation 2: Poco allegro		0:57
3.	Variation 3: L'istesso tempo		1:21
4.	Variation 4: Un poco più vivace		1:05
5.	Variation 5: Allegro vivace		0:58
6.	Variation 6: Allegro ma non troppo e serioso		1:55
7.	Variation 7: Un poco più allegro		1:22
8.	Variation 8: Poco vivace		1:47
9.	Variation 9: Allegro pesante e risoluto		1:43
10.	Variation 10: Presto		0:43
11.	Variation 11: Allegretto		1:10
12.	Variation 12: Un poco più moto		0:54
13.	Variation 13: Vivace		1:02
14.	Variation 14: Grave e maestoso		4:17
15.	Variation 15: Presto scherzando		0:37
16.	Variation 16: Allegro		1:03
17.	Variation 17: Allegro		1:12
18.	Variation 18: Poco moderato		2:00
19.	Variation 19: Presto		0:56
20.	Variation 20: Andante		2:07
21.	Variation 21: Allegro con brio – Meno allegro		1:14
22.	Variation 22: Allegro molto (alla "Notte e giorno faticar" di Mozart)		0:54
23.	Variation 23: Allegro assai		0:49
24.	Variation 24: Fughetta: Andante		3:29
25.	Variation 25: Allegro		0:44
26.	Variation 26: Piacevole		1:08
27.	Variation 27: Vivace		1:01
28.	Variation 28: Allegro		1:01
29.	Variation 29: Adagio ma non troppo		1:17
30.	Variation 30: Andante, sempre cantabile		2:05
31.	Variation 31: Largo, molto espressivo		4:44
32.	Variation 32: Fuga: Allegro		3:03
33.	Variation 33: Tempo di minuetto moderato		4:32
	(Recorded live: Royal Festival Hall, London; 30 May 2001)
Compact Disc 2 (475 8324)			57:52
	Frédéric Chopin:
1.	Andante spianato et Grande Polonaise brillante in E-flat major, Op. 22		13:50
	(Recorded: BBC, London; 13 May 1968)
	Felix Mendelssohn:
2.	Variations sérieuses, Op. 54		10:50
	(Recorded live: Royal Festival Hall, London; 25 March 1990)
	Ferruccio Busoni:
	Elegien, BV 249 (1908)
3.	No. 3: Meine Seele bangt und hofft zu dir (Moderato, un pò maestoso)		7:17
4.	No. 6: Erscheinung (Andante amoroso)		4:49
	(Recorded live: Royal Festival Hall, London; 22 October 1997)
	Ludwig van Beethoven:
	Piano Sonata No. 28 in A major, Op. 101
5.	I.	Etwas lebhaft, und mit der innigsten Empfindung. (Allegretto, ma non troppo con intimissimo sentimento)	3:49
6.	II.	Lebhaft. Marschmäßig (Vivace alla marcia)	6:10
7.	III.	Langsam und sehnsuchtsvoll (Adagio ma non troppo, con affetto)	10:58
	(Recorded live: Symphony Hall, Birmingham; 26 November 1992)

== See also ==
- Alfred Brendel discography
- Great Pianists of the 20th Century – Alfred Brendel III
