= Great Pianists of the 20th Century – Martha Argerich =

1999 compilation album

Compilation album by Martha Argerich
- Released: October 20, 1998
- Recorded: 1967–1982
- Studios: Berlin and London
- Genre: Classical
- Length: 2:39
- Label: Philips Classics
- Producer: Tom Deacon

Great Pianists of the 20th Century – Martha Argerich is the second volume of the Great Pianists of the 20th Century box set and is the first of two volumes dedicated to her. The album features music by the composers Johann Sebastian Bach, Franz Liszt, Sergei Prokofiev, Sergei Rachmaninoff, and Maurice Ravel. The works were recorded between 1967 and 1982.

== Featured works ==
=== Franz Liszt ===
Piano Concerto No. 1 in E flat major, S. 124±

=== Maurice Ravel ===
Piano Concerto in G major±±
Sonatine
Gaspard de la nuit

=== Sergei Rachmaninoff ===
Piano Concerto No. 3 in D minor, Op. 30±±±

=== Johann Sebastian Bach ===
Partita No. 2 in C minor, BWV 826

=== Sergei Prokofiev ===
Piano Concerto No. 3 in C major, Op. 26±±
± London Symphony Orchestra conducted by Claudio Abbado
±± Berliner Philharmoniker conducted by Claudio Abbado
±±± RSO Berlin conducted by Riccardo Chailly

== Track listing ==
=== Disc 1 ===
- Liszt: Piano Concerto No. 1 In E Flat, S. 124:
1. 1: "Allegro maestoso" – 5:08
2. 2a: "Quasi adagio" – 4:23
3. 2b: "Allegretto vivace – Allegro animato" – 4:03
4. 3: "Allegro marziale animato" – 4:01
- Ravel: Piano Concerto in G major
1. 1: "Allegramente" – 8:11
2. 2: "Adagio assai" – 9:02
3. 3: "Presto" – 3:55
- Rachmaninoff: Piano Concerto No. 3 in D minor, Op. 30
1. 1: "Allegro ma non tanto" – 15:26
2. 2: "Intermezzo. Adagio" – 11:00
3. 3: "Finale. Alla breve" – 13:53

=== Disc 2 ===
- J.S.Bach: Partita No. 2 in C minor, BWV 826
1. 1 "Sinfona. Grave adagio – Andante" – 4:15
2. 2 "Allemande" – 4:18
3. 3 "Courante" – 2:08
4. 4 "Sarabande" – 3:54
5. 5 "Rondeaux" – 1:17
6. 6 "Capriccio" – 3:06
- Ravel: Sonatine
1. 1 "Modéré" – 3:59
2. 2 "Mouvement de menuet" – 3:01
3. 3 "Animé" – 3:37
- Ravel: Gaspard de la nuit
1. 1 "Ondine" – 6:19
2. 2 "Le gibet" – 6:42
3. 3 "Scarbo" – 9:18
- Prokofiev: Concerto No. 3 In C, Op. 26
1. 1 "Andante – Allegro" – 9:00
2. 2 "Tema con variazione" – 9:03
3. 3 "Allegro ma non troppo" – 9:03
