= Great Pianists of the 20th Century – Martha Argerich II =

1999 compilation album

Great Pianists of the 20th Century - Martha Argerich II

Compilation album by Martha Argerich
- Released: July 20, 1999
- Recorded: at Berlin and München
- Genre: Classical
- Length: 2:29:00
- Label: Polygram
- Producer: Tom Deacon

Great Pianists of the 20th Century – Martha Argerich II is the third volume of the Great Pianists of the 20th Century box set and is the second of two volumes dedicated to her. The album features music by the composers Frédéric Chopin, Franz Liszt, and Robert Schumann. The works were recorded between 1960 and 1975.

== Featured works ==
=== Frédéric Chopin ===
- Prelude in C sharp minor, Op. 45
- Polonaise in A flat, Op. 61 'Polonaise Fantasie'
- 3 Mazurkas, Op. 59
- Scherzo No. 3 in C sharp minor, Op. 39
- 24 Preludes, Op. 28
- Scherzo No. 2 in B flat minor, Op. 31
- Polonaise in A flat, Op. 53 'Heroic'
- Piano Sonata No. 3 in B minor, Op. 58

=== Robert Schumann ===
- Piano Sonata No. 2 in G minor, Op. 22

=== Franz Liszt ===
- Piano Sonata in B minor, S. 178
- Hungarian Rhapsody No. 6 in D flat major, S. 244

== Track listing ==
=== Disc 1 ===
1. "Prelude in C sharp minor, Op. 45" – 4:02
2. "Polonaise in A flat, Op. 61 'Polonaise-Fantasie'" – 11:28
3. "Mazurka in A minor, Op. 59 No. 1" – 3:17
4. "Mazurka in A flat, Op. 59 No. 2" – 2:16
5. "Mazurka in F sharp minor, Op. 59 No. 3" – 2:42
6. "Scherzo No. 3 in C sharp minor" – 6:26
7. "Prelude No. 1 in C, Op. 28" – 0:30
8. "Prelude No. 2 in A minor, Op. 28" – 2:10
9. "Prelude No. 3 in G, Op. 28" – 0:51
10. "Prelude No. 4 in E minor, Op. 28" – 1:52
11. "Prelude No. 5 in D, Op. 28" – 0:31
12. "Prelude No. 6 in B minor, Op. 28" – 1:47
13. "Prelude No. 7 in A, Op. 28" – 0:44
14. "Prelude No. 8 in F sharp minor, Op. 28 – 1:27
15. "Prelude No. 9 in E, Op. 28" – 1:30
16. "Prelude No. 10 in C sharp minor, Op. 28" – 0:25
17. "Prelude No. 11 in B, Op. 28" – 0:33
18. "Prelude No. 12 in G sharp minor, Op. 28" – 0:57
19. "Prelude No. 13 in F sharp, Op. 28" – 2:45
20. "Prelude No. 14 in E flat minor, Op. 28" – 0:28
21. "Prelude No. 15 in D flat, Op. 28 'Raindrop'" – 4:51
22. "Prelude No. 16 in B flat minor, Op. 28" – 0:59
23. "Prelude No. 17 in A flat, Op. 28" – 2:48
24. "Prelude No. 18 in F minor, Op. 28" – 0:47
25. "Prelude No. 19 in E flat, Op. 28" – 1:04
26. "Prelude No. 20 in C minor, Op. 28" – 1:32
27. "Prelude No. 21 in B flat, Op. 28" – 1:34
28. "Prelude No. 22 in G minor, Op. 28" – 0:35
29. "Prelude No. 23 in F, Op. 28" – 0:43
30. "Prelude No. 24 in D minor, Op. 28" – 2:12
31. "Scherzo No. 2 in B flat minor, Op. 31" – 8:50
32. "Polonaise in A flat, Op. 53 'Heroic' – 6:17

=== Disc 2 ===
1. "Allegro maestoso" – 10:53
2. "Scherzo. Molto vivace" – 2:15
3. "Largo" – 8:42
4. "Finale. Presto non tanto" – 4:21
5. "So rasch wie möglich – Schneller – Noch schneller" – 5:28
6. "Andantino" – 4:53
7. "Scherzo. Sehr rasch und markiert" – 1:31
8. "Rondo. Presto – Etwas langsamer – Prestissimo, quasi candeza – Immer schneller und schneller" – 4:41
9. "Lento assai – Allegro energico – Grandioso – Recitativo" – 10:45
10. "Anndante sostenuto" – 5:35
11. "Allegro energico – Andante sostenuto – Lento assai" – 9:25
12. "Hungarian Rhaspsody No. 6 in D flat" – 6:17
