= Alfred Brendel =

Austrian composer and pianist (1931–2025)

Alfred Brendel KBE
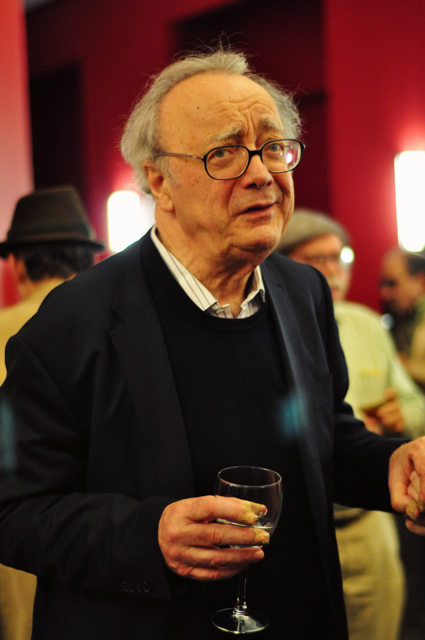
- Brendel in 2010
- Born: 5 January 1931; Vizmberk, Czechoslovakia
- Died: 17 June 2025 (aged 94); London, England
- Education: Graz Conservatory
- Occupations: Pianist; composer; writer
- Awards: Pour le Mérite for Sciences and Arts; Léonie Sonning Music Prize; Ernst von Siemens Music Prize
- Website: alfredbrendel.com

Alfred Brendel (5 January 1931 – 17 June 2025) was a Czech-born Austrian classical pianist, poet, author, composer and lecturer, based in London. He is noted for his performances of music by Ludwig van Beethoven, Franz Schubert, and Franz Liszt. He made three recordings of Beethoven's 32 piano sonatas and was the first pianist to record Beethoven's complete works for solo piano.

== Life and career ==
Brendel was born in Vizmberk, (Note: Vizmberk had formerly been called Wiesenberg when it had been part of Austria-Hungary, but was renamed after the creation of Czechoslovakia following the breakup of the Austro-Hungarian Empire.) Czechoslovakia (now Loučná nad Desnou, Czech Republic) on 5 January 1931 to a non-musical family. They moved to Zagreb, Yugoslavia (now Croatia) when he was three years old and he began piano lessons there, with Sofija Deželić, at age six. The family later moved to Graz, Austria, following the father who worked as an architectural engineer, businessman, resort hotel manager and cinema director. He studied piano with Ludovica von Kaan at the Graz Conservatory and composition with Artur Michl. Towards the end of World War II, the 14-year-old Brendel was sent back to Yugoslavia to dig trenches.

After the war, Brendel composed music as well as continuing to play the piano, to write and to paint; he never had more formal piano lessons and was largely self-taught after age 16.

Aged 17, Brendel first performed publicly in Graz. His programme, titled "The Fugue in Piano Literature," included fugal works by Bach, Brahms and Liszt, as well as a piano sonata he had composed, featuring a double fugue. He also published writings and exhibited art. In 1949, he won fourth prize in the Ferruccio Busoni Piano Competition in Bolzano, Italy. Subsequent tours in Europe and Latin America began to establish his reputation, and he took master classes with Paul Baumgartner, Eduard Steuermann and Edwin Fischer.

Brendel's first recording was of Prokofiev's Piano Concerto No. 5 in 1950. Two years later, he made the world premiere recording of Liszt's Weihnachtsbaum. He went on to make other strings of recordings, including three complete sets of Beethoven's 32 piano sonatas (one on Vox Records and two on Philips Records). He was the first performer to record Beethoven's complete solo piano works.

Brendel's international breakthrough came after a recital of Beethoven at the Queen Elizabeth Hall in London; the following day, three major record labels called his agent. In 1971 he moved to Hampstead, London, where he lived for the rest of his life. After the 1970s, Brendel recorded for Philips Classics Records. He recorded Mozart's piano concertos with Sir Neville Marriner and the Academy of St Martin in the Fields, which is included in the 180-CD complete Mozart Edition. He also recorded numerous works by Liszt, Brahms, Robert Schumann, and particularly Franz Schubert.

Brendel completed many tours in Europe, the United States, South America, Japan and Australia. He had a particularly close association with both the Vienna Philharmonic and the Berlin Philharmonic; he is only the third pianist (after Emil von Sauer and Wilhelm Backhaus) to have been awarded honorary membership of the Vienna Philharmonic, and he was awarded the Hans von Bülow Medal by the Berlin Philharmonic. He played regularly with all major orchestras in the US and elsewhere, performing many cycles of Beethoven's piano sonatas and concertos. He was one of few pianists able to fill large halls even in later years.

Brendel worked with younger pianists such as Paul Lewis, Amandine Savary, Till Fellner and Kit Armstrong. He also performed in concert and recorded with his son, the cellist Adrian Brendel and appeared in many Lieder recitals with singers including Dietrich Fischer-Dieskau and Matthias Goerne.

In 2007 Brendel announced that he would retire from the concert platform after his concert of 18 December 2008 in Vienna, which featured him as soloist in Mozart's Piano Concerto No. 9; the orchestra (the Vienna Philharmonic) was conducted by Sir Charles Mackerras. His final concert in New York was at Carnegie Hall on 20 February 2008, with works by Haydn, Mozart, Beethoven and Schubert. Since his debut at Carnegie Hall on 21 January 1973, he performed there 81 times, including complete cycles of Beethoven's piano sonatas in 1983.

In April 2007, Brendel was one of the initial signatories of the "Appeal for the Establishment of a Parliamentary Assembly at the United Nations".

In 2009 Brendel was featured in the German-Austrian documentary Pianomania, about a Steinway & Sons piano tuner, directed by Lilian Franck and Robert Cibis. The film premiered theatrically in North America, where it was met with positive reviews by The New York Times.

=== Personal life ===
Brendel was married from 1960 to 1972 to Iris Heymann-Gonzala; they had a daughter, Doris, who became a progressive rock and pop rock musician. In 1975, Brendel married Irene Semler; they had three children, a son, Adrian, who became a cellist, and two daughters, Katharina and Sophie. They lived in Hampstead, London.

Brendel died at his home in London on 17 June 2025, at the age of 94.

== Work ==
Brendel performed series of the music of Haydn, Beethoven, Schubert, Mozart and Liszt. He was particularly close to the works of Schubert, described by Gerald Felber from the Frankfurter Allgemeine Zeitung as of "luminous warmth, vulnerable and sad, painfully transience-conscious and at the same time dreamlike" and "obsessed with beauty". Brendel performed and recorded little of the music of Frédéric Chopin, but not because of lack of admiration for the composer; considering his Preludes "the most glorious achievement in piano music after Beethoven and Schubert". Brendel saw Liszt as a misunderstood composer, as exposed in an essay of the 1960s, "Der mißverstandene Liszt," and devoted performances and recordings to a discovery of Liszt as a serious composer, not without critically seeing weak points also. Brendel played relatively few 20th-century works but did perform Schoenberg's Piano Concerto.

Harold C. Schonberg from the New York Times noted that some critics accused the pianist of "pedanticism". Brendel's playing was sometimes described as "cerebral," and he said that he believed that the primary job of the pianist is to respect the composer's wishes without showing off himself, or adding his own spin on the music: "I am responsible to the composer, and particularly to the piece". Brendel cited, in addition to his mentor and teacher Edwin Fischer, pianists Alfred Cortot and Wilhelm Kempff, and the conductors Bruno Walter and Wilhelm Furtwängler as particular influences on his musical development.

Reviewing his 1993 Beethoven: The Late Piano Sonatas (Philips Duo 438374), Damian Thompson of The Daily Telegraph described it as "a more magisterial approach ... sprinkled with touches of Brendel's strange, quirky humour."

=== Recordings ===
- Alfred Brendel – Unpublished Live and Radio Performances 1968–2001
- Great Pianists of the 20th Century – Alfred Brendel III

=== Publications ===
Brendel was a prolific author. His writings have appeared in English, German, French, Italian, Spanish, Dutch, Japanese, Korean, and other languages. For several years, he was a contributor to The New York Review of Books. His own books include:

- 1976: Musical Thoughts and Afterthoughts, essays, Robson Books
- 1990: Music Sounded Out, essays including "Must Classical Music be Entirely Serious?", Farrar Straus Giroux
- 1998: One Finger Too Many, poetry, Random House
- 2001: Alfred Brendel on Music, collected essays, A Cappella
- 2003: Me, of All People: Alfred Brendel in Conversation with Martin Meyer (UK edition: The Veil of Order), Cornell University Press
- 2004, Cursing Bagels, poetry, Faber & Faber
- 2010: Playing the Human Game, collected poems, Phaidon Press
- 2013: A Pianist's A–Z: A Piano Lover's Reader. Faber & Faber. ISBN 978-0-571-30184-3.

== Awards and accolades ==
- Honorary Knight Commander of the Order of the British Empire (KBE; 1989)
- Pour le Mérite for Sciences and Arts (1991)
- Hans von Bülow Medal of the Berlin Philharmonic (1992)
- Beethoven-Ring of the Vienna Music University (2001)
- Léonie Sonning Music Prize (2002; Denmark)
- Ernst von Siemens Music Prize (2004)
- Prix Venenia: Premio Artur Rubinstein (2007)
- Praemium Imperiale (2009)
- Herbert von Karajan Music Prize (2008)
- Franz Liszt-Ehrenpreis (2011)
- Juilliard Medal (2011)
- Voted into the Gramophone Hall of Fame (2012)
- Golden Mozart Medal of the Salzburg Mozarteum (2014)
- Echo Klassik Lifetime Achievement Award (2016)

Brendel was awarded honorary doctorates from universities including London (1978), Oxford (1983), Yale (1992), University College Dublin (2007), McGill Montreal (2011), Cambridge (2012) and York (2018) and held other honorary degrees from the Royal College of Music in London (1999), New England Conservatory (2009), University of Music Franz Liszt Weimar (2009) and the Juilliard School (2011). He was an honorary Fellow of Exeter College, Oxford, Wolfson College, Oxford, and Peterhouse, Cambridge. He received Lifetime Achievement Awards by Edison, International Classical Music Awards, and Deutscher Schallplattenpreis, among others.

In 2012, Limelight asked 100 pianists which other pianist inspired them the most. In addition to his student, Paul Lewis, Brendel was mentioned by three others. He was included in Peter Donohoe's "Fifty Great Pianists" series for BBC Radio 3, which aired in 2012.
