= Piano Concerto No. 2 (Beethoven) =

Classical orchestral work by Beethoven

Piano Concerto in B♭ major
- No. 2
- by Ludwig van Beethoven
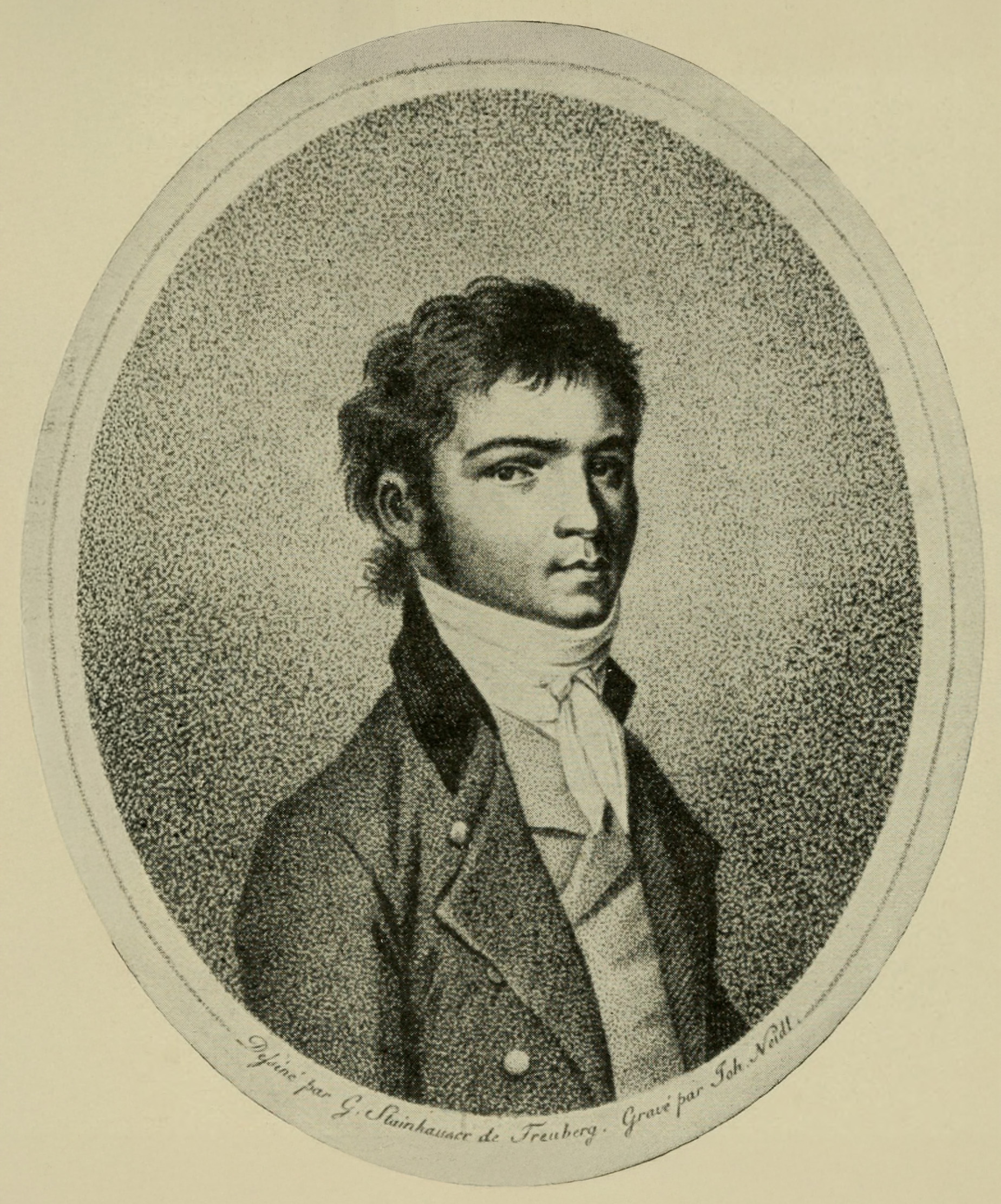
- 1801 engraving by Johann Joseph Neidl, after a now-lost portrait of Beethoven by Gandolph Ernst Stainhauser von Treuberg, ca. 1800
- Opus: 19
- Style: Classical period
- Performed: 29 March 1795: Vienna (Note: Evidence is unclear as to whether it was this concerto that was performed on that date or the Piano Concerto no. 1 op. 15 (actually written later than no. 2))
- Published: 1801
- Movements: Three (Allegro con brio; Adagio; Rondo. Molto allegro)
- Scoring: Piano; orchestra

The Piano Concerto No. 2 in B♭ major, Op. 19, by Ludwig van Beethoven was composed primarily between 1787 and 1789, although it did not attain the form in which it was published until 1795. Beethoven did write a second finale for it in 1798 for performance in Prague, but that is not the finale that was published. It was used by the composer as a vehicle for his own performances as a young virtuoso, initially intended with the Bonn Hofkapelle. It was published in December 1801 as Op. 19, later than the publication in March that year of his later composition the Piano Concerto No. 1 in C major as Op. 15, and thus became designated as his second piano concerto.

The B♭ major Piano Concerto was an important display piece for the young Beethoven as he sought to establish himself after moving from Bonn to Vienna. He may have premiered it on 29 March 1795, at Vienna's Burgtheater in a concert marking his public debut. Prior to that, he had performed only in the private salons of the Viennese nobility. While the work as a whole is very much in the concerto style of Mozart, there is a sense of drama and contrast that would be present in many of Beethoven's later works.

Beethoven himself apparently did not rate this work particularly highly, remarking to the publisher Franz Anton Hoffmeister that, along with the Piano Concerto No. 1, it was "not one of my best." He revised the concerto repeatedly, in 1790, 1793, 1794–95, 1798 and 1801. However, the pianist Peter Serkin has noted that Beethoven's writing of the cadenza of the first movement much later than the concerto proper "indicates [his] own regard for his early concerto". The version that he may have premiered in 1795 is the version that is performed and recorded today.

== Movements ==
The work is scored for solo piano, flute, two oboes, two bassoons, two horns and strings; it is the only one of Beethoven's seven completed concertos that omits clarinets, trumpets and timpani.

The concerto is in three movements:

1. Allegro con brio
2. Adagio (in E♭ major)
3. Rondo. Molto allegro

The first movement begins with a triumphant orchestral opening on the tonic chord, and maintains a playfulness while using chromatic passages to show off the soloist's technique. The second movement is characteristically serene and peaceful, while the closing Rondo brings back the youth-filled playfulness heard in the opening movement.

=== I. Allegro con brio ===
This movement is in the concerto variant of sonata form (double-exposition sonata form, in which the soloist repeats the orchestra's initial exposition of the musical material of the movement). The orchestra introduces the main theme in B♭ major, and the subordinate theme in D♭ major, in its exposition. In the second exposition, the subordinate theme is in F major. The development wanders in key and ends on a long B♭ major scale. The recapitulation is similar to the expositions and is in B♭ major.

There is a rather difficult cadenza composed by Beethoven himself, albeit much later than the concerto itself. Stylistically, the cadenza is very different from the concerto, but it makes use of the first opening theme. Beethoven applies this melody to the cadenza in several different ways, changing its character each time and displaying the innumerable ways that a musical theme can be used and felt.

This movement was written between 1787 and 1789 in Bonn. Average performances last from thirteen to fourteen minutes.

=== II. Adagio ===
This movement is in E♭ major, the subdominant key. Like many slow movements, it has ABA (ternary) form, where the opening section introduces the themes, and the middle section develops them. This movement was written between 1787 and 1789 in Bonn. Average performances last from eight to nine minutes.

=== III. Rondo, Molto allegro ===
This movement takes the form of a rondo (ABACABA) and showcases Beethoven's playfulness of his early period. The theme is rhythmically unbalanced by sforzandi on beats 2 and 5 of each 6/8 measure. The C section is also highly contrasting with the others, in a minor key and intensifying the syncopation of the main theme's sforzandi.

Prior to the last appearance of the rondo theme, Beethoven brings the piano in the "wrong" key of G major, and with the theme displaced early by one beat with respect to the barline, before the orchestra "discovers" the discrepancy and returns to the correct tonic key and metric alignment. This musical joke can be seen in many of Beethoven's subsequent compositions.

This rondo is the one that Beethoven wrote in 1795 and premiered in Vienna that year. It shows Haydn's influence, particularly in usage of sonata rondo form. An average performance lasts from five to six minutes.

=== Rondo in B♭ major, WoO 6 ===
Beethoven originally composed a different rondo to end the concerto. It was replaced in 1795.
