= Philips Classics Records =

Classical music label

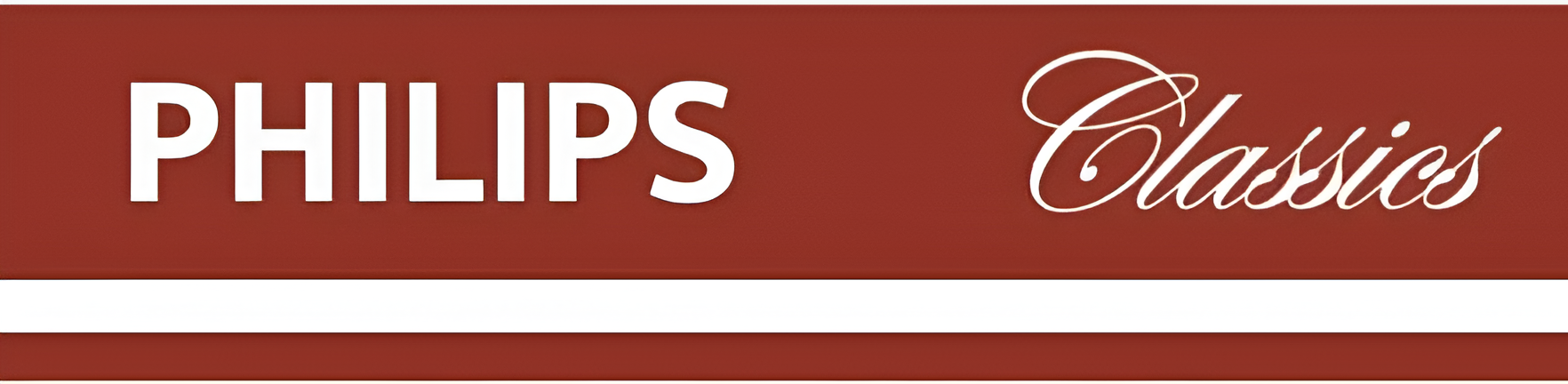
- Logo
- Parent company: PolyGram (1983–1998); Universal Music Group (1999–2008)
- Founded: 1983
- Founder: Phonogram International B.V., subsidiary of PolyGram
- Defunct: 2009
- Genre: Classical music
- Country of origin: Netherlands
- Location: Baarn

Philips Classics Records, commonly referred to as Philips Classics, was a classical music label founded by PolyGram that existed from 1983 to 2009. A new division called Philips Classics Productions was set up to manage the Philips Classics label.

It was successful with artists including Alfred Brendel, Sir John Eliot Gardiner, Sir Neville Marriner and the Academy of St Martin in the Fields, Ton Koopman and the Amsterdam Baroque Orchestra & Choir, Mitsuko Uchida, Julian Lloyd Webber, Sir Colin Davis and André Rieu.

A significant release by the label was the 180-CD The Complete Mozart Edition, which featured all works by Wolfgang Amadeus Mozart, known at the set's publication in 1990–1991 for the bicentenary of the composer's death. It was re-released as the Complete Compact Mozart Edition.

In 1997, Philips Classics Productions was reorganized as Philips Music Group.

Parent Universal Music Group, which was formed in 1999 from the merger of the PolyGram and MCA families of labels, merged the label into Decca Records. Decca continued to use the Philips Classics label for re-editions until 2009 under a licensing agreement with the Philips company.

== See also ==
- List of record labels
