= Enz (disambiguation) =

Enz or ENZ may refer to:

== Rivers in Germany ==
- Enz, tributary of the River Neckar near Besigheim, county of Ludwigsburg, Baden-Württemberg, with two headstreams above Calmbach, Bad Wildbad, county of Calw:
  - Große Enz, linker Oberlauf, often counted as the Enz itself
  - Kleine Enz, right headstream
- Enz (Prüm), right tributary of the River Prüm in the Eifel in Holsthum, county of Bitburg-Prüm, Rhineland-Palatinate

== People with the surname ==
- Charles Enz (1925–2019), Swiss physicist
- Jörg Enz (born 1974), German jazz guitarist
- Kurt Enz (1931–2004), German engineer, film engineer and specialist author
- Wilhelm Enz (1878–1966), German politician (SPD)

== Transport ==
- Jota Aviation (ICAO: ENZ), a defunct British specialist charter airline that operated from 2009 to 2022

== Miscellaneous ==
- Waldbad Enz, open-air swimming pool in Dornbirn, Vorarlberg, Austria
- Split Enz, New Zealand band
- Engineering New Zealand, a non-profit membership organisation
- Enzyme, a large biological molecule that acts as a catalyst

== See also ==
- Enns (disambiguation)
- Ens (disambiguation)
- Entz
- Enzbach
