= Ens =

Ens or ENS may refer to:

== People ==
- Gerhard Ens (1864–1952), Canadian politician
- Jewel Ens (1889–1950), American baseball player and coach
- Mutz Ens (1884–1950), American baseball player
- Sarah Ens (born 1992), Canadian poet

== Places ==
- Ens, Hautes-Pyrénées, France
- Ens, Netherlands
- Ens, Saskatchewan, Canada
- Ens (river), in Bavaria, Germany

== Education ==
- École normale supérieure, a type of publicly funded higher education institution in France:
  - École normale supérieure (Paris)
  - École normale supérieure de Lyon
  - École normale supérieure Paris-Saclay, in Cachan near Paris
  - École normale supérieure de Rennes

== Health and medicine ==
- Enteric nervous system
- Empty nose syndrome
- Engineered negligible senescence

== Other uses ==
- Emergency notification system
- Encash Network Service, a Philippine interbank network
- EnerSys, an American battery manufacturer, NYSE symbol
- Ensamble Nacional del Sur, an Argentinian music ensemble
- Enschede Airport Twente, in the Netherlands
- Ensemble, a political coalition in France (English:Together (coalition))
- Ensign (rank), a junior officer rank
- Environment News Service, an American news agency
- European Nuclear Society
- Italian National Agency for the Deaf (Italian: Ente Nazionale Sordi)
- Ethereum Name Service
