= Damián Anache =

Argentine composer (born 1981)

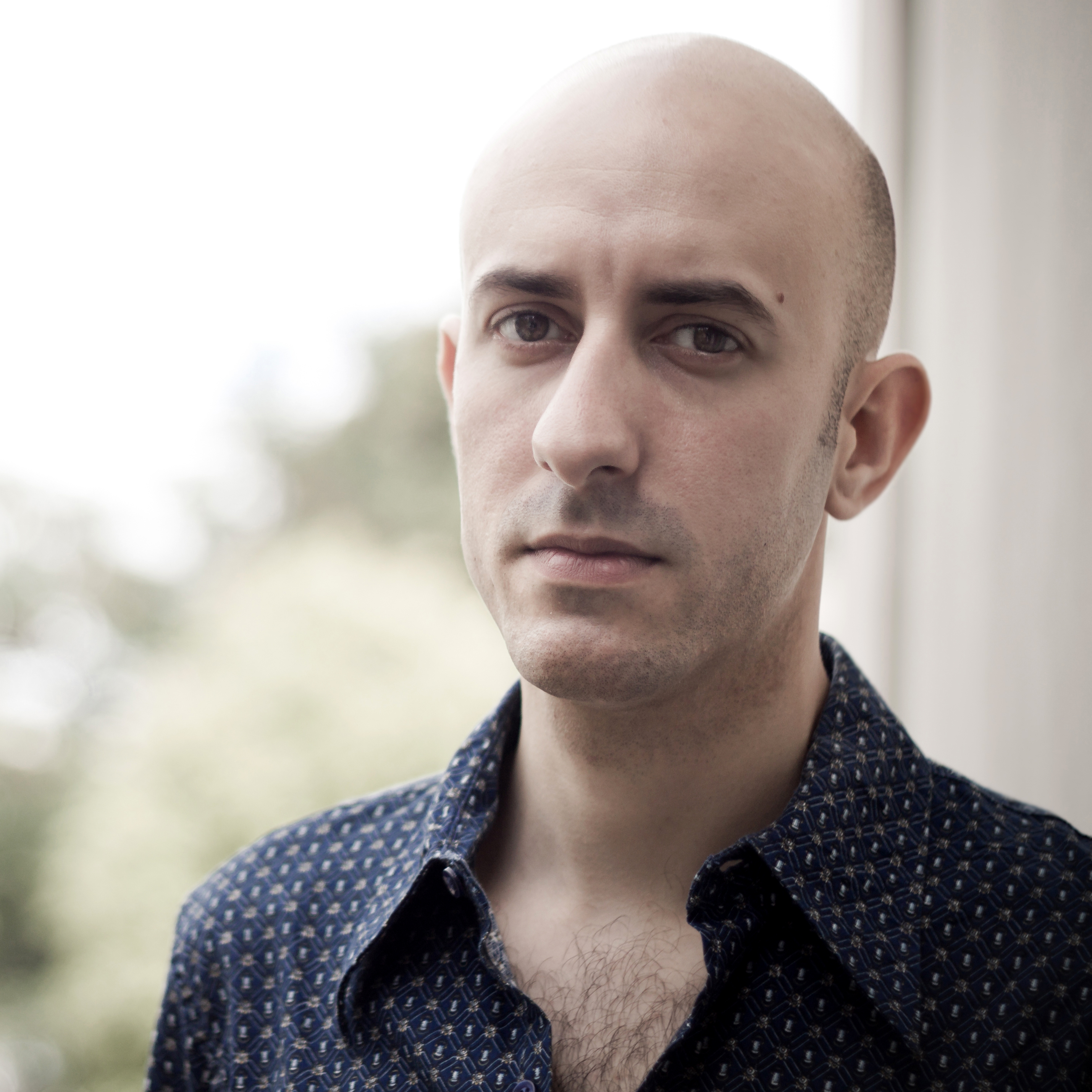
- Portrait 2013

Background information
- Born: 11 October 1981 (age 44)
- Origin: Quilmes, Buenos Aires, Argentina
- Genres: Electroacoustic, Experimental, Ambient music, Sound art, Electronic music
- Occupations: Composer, sound artist, researcher, professor
- Labels: Concepto Cero, Inkilino Records, Must Die Records, Already Dead Tapes, Strudelsoft
- Formerly of: ENS − Ensamble Nacional del Sur; Buenos Aires Sonora
- Website: damiananache.com.ar

Damián Anache (born 11 October 1981) is an Argentine composer, sound artist, researcher and professor. His work focuses on experimental and electroacoustic music, incorporating spatial audio techniques and algorithmic composition. He has released solo albums and contributed to various collaborative projects in the fields of contemporary and electronic music.

== Career ==
Anache's work integrates Ambisonics and digital synthesis with generative compositional methods. His research explores the relationships between sound, space, and perception, often employing real-time processing techniques. He has presented his music and research in academic and artistic contexts, collaborating with institutions such as the Mexican Center for Music and Sonic Arts ( CMMAS) and the National University of Quilmes (UNQ).

As a professor, he teaches at the National University of Tres de Febrero (UNTREF) and the National University of Quilmes (UNQ), where he also participates in the research area. Additionally, he has worked at the Universidad Nacional de las Artes and the Universidad del Cine.

He was a performer for the ensembles Buenos Aires Sonora and ENS − Ensamble Nacional del Sur (conducted by Oscar Edelstein). During his participation in the latter, he designed and built their own version of a Lithophone together with Axel Lastra.

As a producer he worked on several projects such as Brahman Cero and Excursiones Polares, including the participation of both bands on the album Los Ellos inspired by El Eternauta, the classic science fiction comic created by Argentine writer Héctor Germán Oesterheld with artwork by Francisco Solano López (the edition of the album was supported by the Ministry of Culture of the Nation).

As a composer some of his works have been performed in concerts and events held in Conservatorio Santa Cecilia (Roma, ITA); Espacio Sonoro UAM-X - Universidad Autónoma Metropolitana (DF, MEX); CMMAS - Centro Mexicano para la Música y las Artes Sonoras (Morelia, MEX); Museo de Arte Moderno de Ecuador (Quito, ECU); Universidad Nacional de Córdoba (Córdoba, ARG); Centro Cultural Roberto Fontanarrosa (Rosario, ARG); Centro Cultural de España en Buenos Aires and Centro Cultural Recoleta (BsAs, ARG).

His debut solo album, Capturas del Único Camino (2014), was composed using algorithmic techniques and processed field recordings. His second album, Lento, en un jardín reticular (2024), continues his exploration of live electronic performance, using real-time digital synthesis and Ambisonics encoding.

== Discography ==
- Capturas del Único Camino (2014, Concepto Cero & Inkilino Records; 2016, Must Die Records; 2016, Already Dead Tapes)
- Lento, en un jardín reticular (2024, Inkilino Records)

== Publications ==
- Tekné: Apropiaciones desde el arte actual (2019) - Compiled by Damián Anache, this book gathers writings from a group of artist-authors active in various disciplines related to the intersection of art and new technologies. The book offers a diverse range of themes and discursive approaches. Published by Fundación Alfonso y Luz Castillo, Buenos Aires. ISBN 978-987-46951-3-0.
