= Lento, en un jardín reticular =

Studio album by Damián Anache
- Released: November 9, 2024
- Recorded: 2023–2024
- Studio: Home studio, and Convolution studio at CMMAS (Mexican Center for Music and Sonic Arts)
- Genre: Experimental music, electronic, dark ambient, noise, electroacoustic, drone, glitch, minimalism
- Length: 50:43
- Label: Inkilino Records
- Producer: Damián Anache

Damián Anache chronology
Capturas del Único Camino (2016)	Lento, en un jardín reticular (2024)

Lento, en un jardín reticular (transl. Slow, in a reticular garden) is the second experimental electronic music album by Argentine musician Damián Anache, released in 2024 by Inkilino Records. Recorded live in the studio, the album explores the tension between composition and improvisation, using exclusively real-time manipulated digital synthesis techniques with open-source software.

The album was released in digital format on major streaming platforms and also has a limited-edition 7-inch red vinyl, featuring two tracks in exclusive versions.

== Production and concept ==
Following the sonic exploration present in his previous works, Lento, en un jardín reticular was composed and performed live, without post-production editing. The album is based on the use of graphic scores and a series of digital instruments developed by Anache in the open-source platform Pure Data. Each piece employs a unique combination of score and instrument, all utilizing digital synthesis techniques for real-time manipulation of sine wave signals and filtered noise bands. The only exception is "Obvio y obtuso", which incorporates a 14-second recording of the artist's own voice.

Granular synthesis plays a significant role in several pieces of the album, using the_grainer~ engine, created by Pablo Di Liscia as part of the Temporal Systems and Spatial Synthesis in Sound Art Research Program. at the National University of Quilmes (UNQ).

The technical and conceptual ideas regarding technology's role in the performance of electronic music were developed by Anache from an analytical perspective with historical review in his article "Interpretation and Bodily Trace in Electronic Music", included in the book Tekné: Appropriations from Contemporary Art (Fundación Alfonso y Luz Castillo, 2019).

Part of the creative process took place in 2023 at the Mexican Center for Music and Sonic Arts (CMMAS), where the album’s opening track, Drishti, was also recorded. This was made possible thanks to a travel grant awarded by the Argentine Ministry of Foreign Affairs.

The album incorporates influences from electroacoustic music, glitch, minimalism, and drone, shaping an aesthetic that moves between dark ambient and noise.

All tracks were created using Ambisonics, a surround sound technique. Both the digital version for streaming platforms and the vinyl edition are UHJ encoded for stereo compatibility. The digital release available on Bandcamp includes an exclusive link to the full B-Format Ambisonics FOA (48 kHz, 24-bit) version.

== Release ==
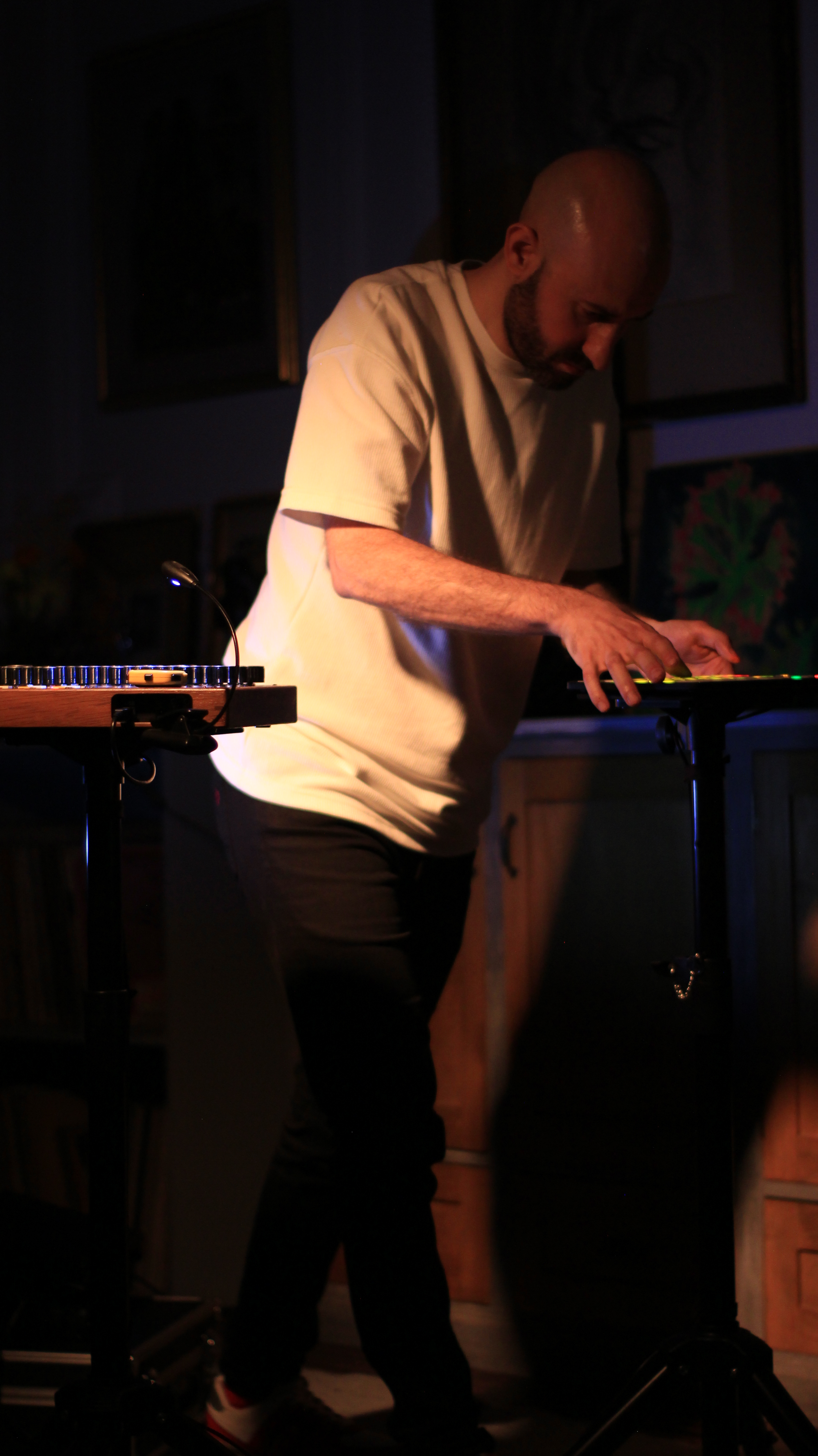
Lento, en un jardín reticular's Live Premier at Ciclo Suena Washington (Ciudad de Buenos Aires) (12/14/2024).

Lento, en un jardín reticular was released on November 9, 2024, through Inkilino Records, with digital distribution on streaming platforms and Bandcamp. The official launch event took place the same day at AnTnA "Red Sonora", located in Galería Larreta, Buenos Aires.

The live presentation of the album was held on December 14, 2024, at the Suena Washington cycle (Colegiales, Buenos Aires), where Anache shared the stage with Vic Bang (Victoria Barca) and the duo Basura (Valentín Pelisch and Pablo Boltshauser).

Some tracks from the album have been featured in radio programs specializing in experimental music and sound art, including 24 Hours of Radio Art, broadcast by the Canadian station CiTR 101.9FM.

One of the standout pieces from the album, "Por Mi Culpa", was presented at various international festivals and events dedicated to sound art, experimental music, and video art. Among the most notable presentations were its screenings at the Transversal Sonora Sound Art Festival (Bogotá, Colombia, November 2022), the BIDEODROMO International Experimental Film and Video Festival (Bilbao, Spain, October 2022), and the XXIII Colloquium on Computer Music (Ancona, Italy, October 2022). Additionally, the piece was featured at the Australasian Computer Music Conference (Wellington, Australia, September 2022), an event organized by the Australasian Computer Music Association (ACMA) and the Espacios Sonoros International Electroacoustic Music Festival (Salta, Argentina, October 2022), among others. These participations solidified the international reach of the work and its recognition within the experimental music and audiovisual art scenes.

== Track listing ==
No.	Title	Length
1.	"Drishti"	3:33
2.	"Concepto espacial áspero (Parte 1)"	4:04
3.	"Por mi culpa"	5:42
4.	"La llanura de las esferas"	8:59
5.	"Obvio y obtuso"	9:15
6.	"Concepto espacial áspero (Parte 2)"	3:35
7.	"Valle de desprendimientos"	6:40
8.	"Un lienzo que fue velo"	8:19
9.	"Epílogo"	0:36
Total length:		50:43

== Critical reception ==
Lento, en un jardín reticular received positive reviews from specialized media. Igloo Magazine highlighted the album's distinctive textures and timbres, stating that Anache "plays with each sound introduced, intent on building with subtle tones rather than flashy timbres." The review also emphasized the ongoing layering and variation throughout the piece, describing it as a rewarding experience for "devoted fans of atonal, electronic music."
