= Capturas del Único Camino =

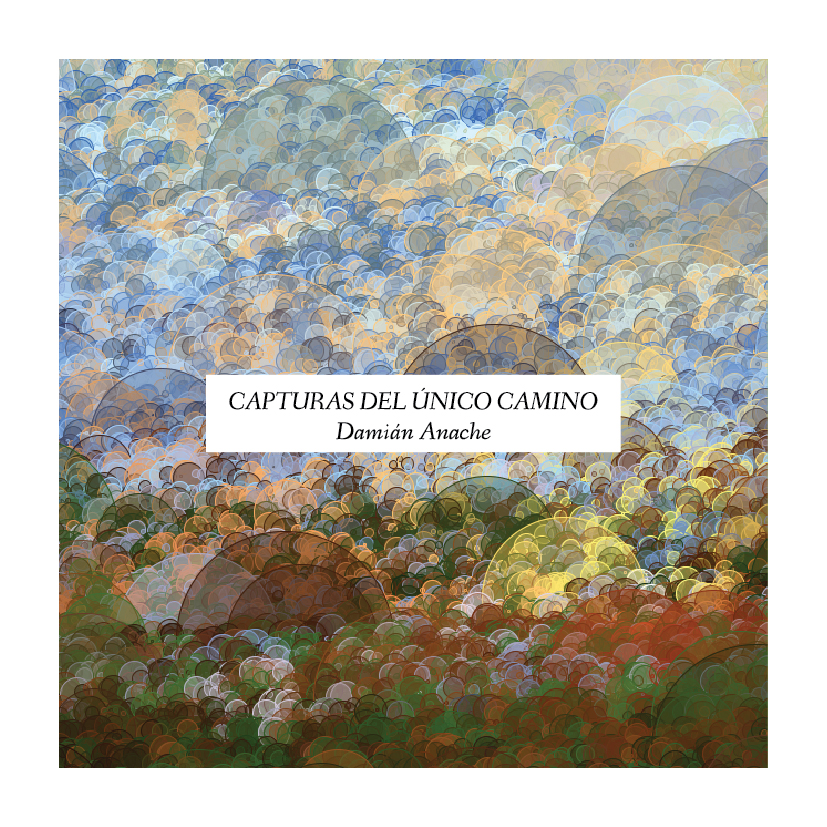

Studio album by Damián Anache
- Released: 10 December 2014
- Genres: Electroacoustic, Avant Garde, Minimalism, Ambient
- Length: 57:53
- Language: Instrumental
- Labels: Concepto Cero, Inkilino Records

Damián Anache chronology
| Capturas del Único Camino (2014) | Lento, en un jardín reticular (2024) |

Professional ratings
Review scores
| Source | Rating |
|---|---|
| Norman Records | 8/10 |
| Club del Disco | (month selection) |
| Tabs Out | (artwork of the month selection) |

Capturas del Único Camino, Damián Anache's first solo album, reveals a recording of a generative piece performed using an algorithm created by himself. The designed software (developed on Pure Data language) manipulates different kinds on sonic materials consisting of: acoustic instruments (played by the composer); sounds generated by his mouth and vocal tract (also by the same composer); sounds created by synthesis techniques; and other recordings of sounds generated by water. This interpretation algorithm involves a list of directions and actions subjected by random choices according to a model proposed for the piece's first section score (printed score included in physical editions). Furthermore, be noted that although the piece is presented as a CD Audio, the same piece is developed in other formats such as audiovisual installation.

== Track listing ==
1. "Paisaje primero" - 14:15
2. "Paisaje propio" - 14:15
3. "Paisaje artificial" - 14:15
4. "Paisaje natural" - 15:08

== Format, codification and digital release ==
The piece was created using Ambisonics, the surround sound technique. CD version is UHJ encoded for stereo compatibility, as well as the digital release which is also available for download at 48 kHz 24 bit. B-format version was announced to be released "soon" on composer's instagram account.

== Credits ==
Composition, image generation and packaging concept by Damian Anache. Realization of packaging and design by Emmanuel Orezzo. Executive Producer: Nicolas Madoery. co-executive-producer: Nicolás Varchausky. This publication was supported by the research project "Spatial sound synthesis in electroacoustic music", directed by Pablo Di Liscia, National University of Quilmes 2013-2015.

== International reissues ==
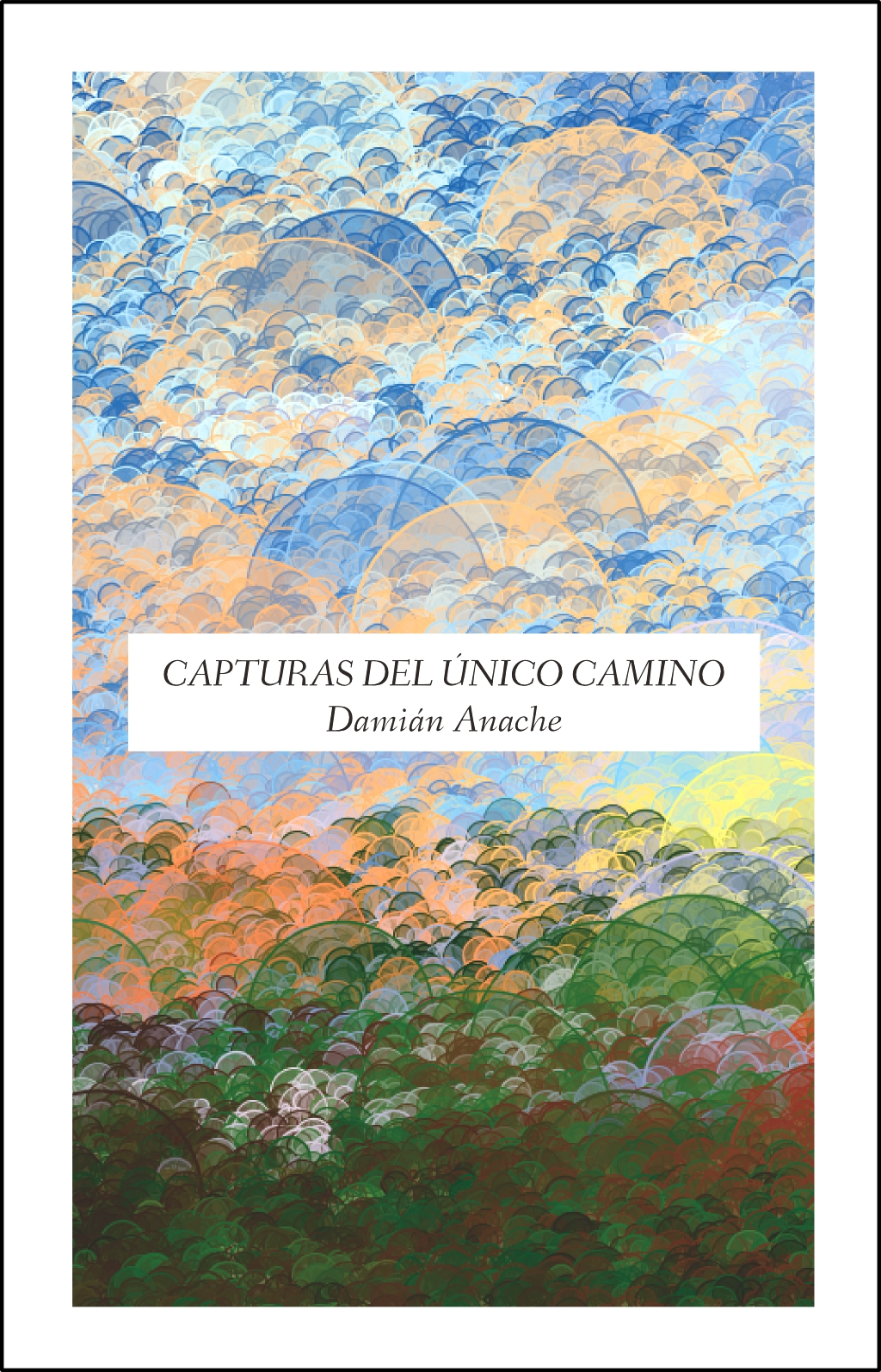
Generative album cover for Capturas del Unico Camino's UK edition. Each international reissue has its own generative cover image

The album has Europe and North American (TBA) reissues. Both offers different generative versions of the piece.

| Country | Label | Cat. No. | Media | Release date |
|---|---|---|---|---|
| Argentina | Concepto Cero & Inkilino Records | CCL011 - IR003 | CD | 2014 |
| Europe | Must Die Records | MDR042 | CASEETTE | 2016 |
| US | Already Dead Tapes | AD202 | CASEETTE | 2016 |

== Public instances ==
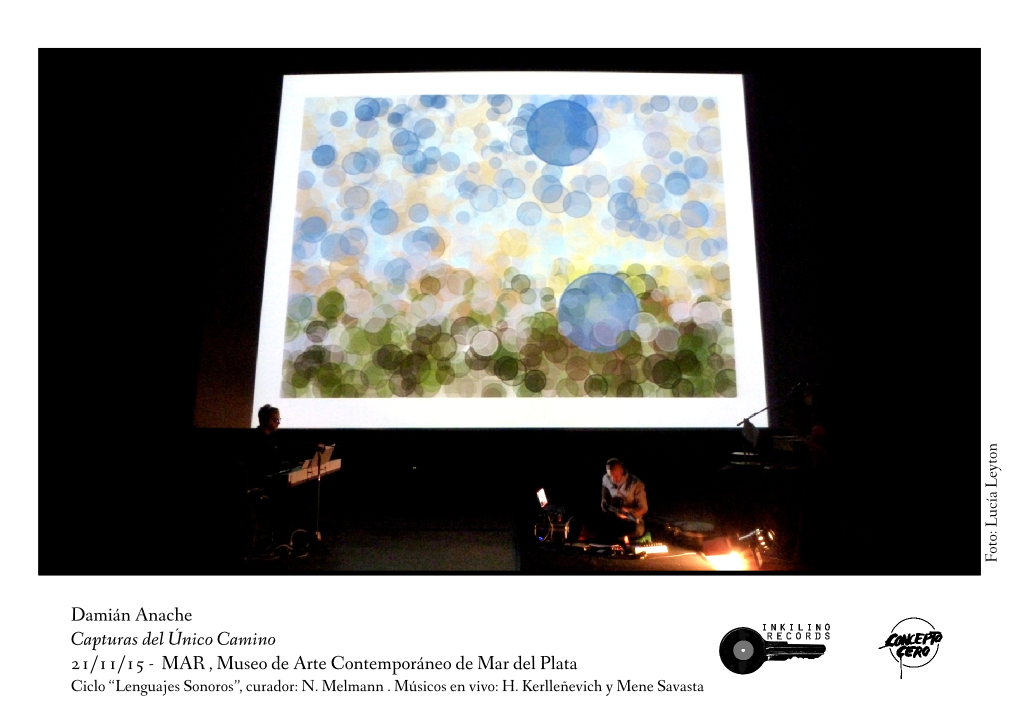
Capturas del Unico Camino's Live Premier at MAR (Museo de Arte Contemporáneo de Mar del Plata) (11/21/2015). On stage: Hernán Kerlleñevich (piano), Mene Savasta Alsina (glockesnpiel and percussion) and Damián Anache (guitar and electronics).

Capturas... has been exposed in different formats: as audiovisual installation, sound art installation, tape electroacoustic music piece (at speaker concerts) and also as live performance music. Those events were:

- La Semana del Sonido, at Centro Cultural Roberto Fontanarrosa, Rosario, Santa Fé, Argentina (May, 2014), tape music for 12 speakers 3D surround system.
- Sintesis Espacial de Sonido concert, at CMMAS (Centro Mexicano para la Música y las Artes Sonoras), Morelia, México (August, 2014), tape music for 8 speakers surround system.
- MUSLAB's Jardín Sonoro, Espacio Sonoro UAM-X (Universidad Autónoma Metropolitana, DF, Mexico) (October, 2014), tape music.
- Album release show at C'est La Vié, La Plata, Argentina (November, 2014), realtime audiovisual installation with 4 speakers surround system.
- Retratos de Ideas outdoors event at National University of Quilmes, Buenos Aires, Argentina (December, 2014), realtime sound art installation with 4 speakers surround system.
- ICMC, International Computer Music Conference 41 edition concert at North Texas University, Denton, Texas, USA (October, 2015), tape music.
- EMU Fest, International Electroacoustic Music Festival at Santa Cecilia, Rome, Italy (October, 2015), tape music for more than 20 speaker 3D surround system.
- Lenguajes Sonoros concert series at MAR (Museo de Arte Contemporáneo de Mar del Plata), Buenos Aires, Argentina, (November, 2015), live performance audiovisual concert.
- in Deference (Claire Walmsley and Jayne Simpson exhibition) opening night, at Abindgon Studios, Blackpool, UK (January, 2016), tape music.
