= Oscar Edelstein =

Argentine contemporary composer

- Born: 12 June 1953 (age 73); La Paz, Argentina
- Genre: Contemporary
- Occupations: Composer, conductor, researcher
- Instrument: Piano
- Member of: Ensamble Nacional del Sur

Oscar Edelstein (born 12 June 1953) is an Argentine contemporary composer. He has been described as leading Latin America's avant-garde. He is also a pianist, conductor, and researcher.

== Biography ==
Oscar Edelstein

Edelstein was born in La Paz, Argentina in the province of Entre Ríos. He spent his childhood in Paraná, Entre Ríos's capital.

Edelstein is from a family of musicians, but his father, a road engineer, also inspired him with a love of machines and technology. He triggered Edelstein's desire to compose by a birthday present at the age of five of a Geloso portable tape recorder. It was his first instrument and tool for composition before the piano.

One piano teacher, Eva Taubas, was significant for allowing him at seven to "improvise Beethoven" in his lessons, in a sense showing him it was possible, as Edelstein puts it, "to destroy Beethoven" and construct something new. At twelve, his aunt, the well-known Argentine pianist Sara Zimerman, played him a Vladimir Horowitz recording, hoping to encourage him to be a classical concert pianist.

Juan Laurentino Ortiz, an Argentinian poet who spent the last years of his life in Paraná, profoundly influenced Edelstein, and became a mentor and guide.

=== Buenos Aires ===
In 1972 Edelstein made the step of moving to the capital to study. He arrived in Buenos Aires with a recommendation from Ortiz to study with Juan Carlos Paz, but Paz died days before he arrived. Edelstein stayed in Buenos Aires and in 1979, he connected with Francisco Kröpfl, considered the best disciple of Paz.

His other teachers, before Kröpfl, were the prominent Argentine composers from a different aesthetic and school, Mariano Etkin and José Maranzano. Later, during the most turbulent years of the period of Argentina's "Dirty War" (1976–78), Edelstein left the country and spent nearly three years traveling and studying. His travels included two years in France, staying near Paris and also going to the Abbaye de Solesmes, visiting libraries, museums, and monasteries to understand more about medieval music.

== Career: revisioning and creating from nothing ==
=== Creating centers, reviews, and ensembles ===
Edelstein's career as a composer has been characterized by breaking new ground. He directs many chamber groups of improvisation in music, frequently exploring the interplay between music and theatre, and has attained several national and international awards for his chamber and electronic productions. He is known for his technical mastery of composition, his original methods of composition and direction of improvisation, and his librettos. As a young leading Argentine composer, he was left with a strong impression from many of the principal composers that he met, such as Pierre Boulez, Mauricio Kagel, György Ligeti, Krzysztof Penderecki, Mario Davidovsky, and John Chowning.

=== Centro de Investigación Musical ===
Between 1974 and 1977, Edelstein was a scholarship holder at the Centro de Investigaciones en Ciencia, Material, Arte y Tecnología (C.I.C.M.A.T – the former Instituto Di Tella), and between 1985 and 1986 he was one of the three young musicians selected to work at the Laboratorio de Investigación y Producción Musical (L.I.P.M.) It was here that he composed one of the works for which he is most known, Viril Occidente I. Another project of Edelstein's in L.I.P.M. was Estudio y Aplicación de los medios digitales en la Composición Musical (1989–1991), supported by a scholarship of the Fundación Antorchas, and used by Edelstein to compose Viril Occidente II (the overture to El Telescopio).

Edelstein also held a scholarship in Science and Technology from the University of Buenos Aires (UBA) to work on several different projects related to music analysis and production with computers at the Centro de Investigación Musical (CIM-UBA), in the University of Buenos Aires. This center was founded and directed by Edelstein from 1985 to 1992, working with a team of professors: Pablo Di Liscia, Daniel Montes, Horacio Gutman, and Pablo Cetta. The CIM was a pioneer in the field of artificial intelligence as applied to music analysis, and the projects they developed were the first to be formally registered in Argentina.

=== Nueva Música, Otras Música, Antorchas' & Lulú ===
Edelstein was also a member of Nueva Música, the group of composers and teachers founded by Paz and continued by Kröpfl, until four years later, in 1984, when Edelstein decided to create a new group with eleven composers of his generation, all from different schools and aesthetics, called Otras Músicas. As an association of composers, Otras Músicas was dedicated to the diffusion of contemporary music in the continent.

In 1991, he continued his efforts to develop Argentina's infrastructure for disseminating ideas and theories of contemporary music in Argentina, by co-founding and editing a specialist music magazine, Lulú: Revista de Teorías y Técnicas Musicales with Carla Fonseca and Federico Monjeau. It was the first journal in Latin America to be dedicated to the contemporary arts, and in the editorial committee were Argentina's most important composers, musicologists, painters, and writers.

In 1992, Edelstein was the youngest artist to win Argentina's prestigious award of the Antorchas' Scholarship for Outstanding Artists of the Intermediate Generation which he used to compose his opera El Telescopio.

=== Music for Theatre ===
Throughout his career he has had close links with theatre, and is known for his collaborations with the Argentine theatre director Roberto Villanueva, working with him on over twenty productions in the major theatres of Buenos Aires. Several directors in Brazil, like Ge Orthof, Hugo Rodas, Fernando Villar, Silvia Davin, and many others, have both staged and re-staged works of acoustic theatre by Edelstein. Edelstein has also made many works that have been used in dance, and is noted for his collaborations with the choreographer and director, Silvia Pritz.

=== Teaching ===
Edelstein is a senior professor and co-founder of the degree in Music Composition in Acoustic and Electro Acoustics, at the University of Quilmes. As well as teaching composition for acoustic and electro-acoustic music. It was only in 2007 that he made the step of introducing his work outside Latin America, by making a research trip to give concerts and master-classes in the UK.

== Approaches to Style: Metaphysical Musical Experiences ==
=== Velorio del Angelito ===
Edelstein quotes two key metaphysical musical experiences that influence his style the most; the first was at the age of six at the funeral of a child – called by the people of the province, a "velorio del angelito" (funeral of a little angel) because, they say, when a child dies that God must have made a mistake – giving an angel to the earth which he needs to take back. Listening to this ritual at the border between the provinces of Entre Rios and Corrientes, with the different kinds of groups all playing at the same time, and the Argentine rhythms of chamamé, polka, vals criollo, cumbia, chacarera, milonga and many others, mixing, and added to by the "lloronas" hired to cry, was like a strange nightmare or a fantastic carnival that he always returns to in his compositions trying to revisit and rewrite.

The second experience was at the age of around fourteen, when he first heard Stockhausen. Edelstein says, "All my life I have been trying to cover this kind of distance." In an interview he noted, "This kind of contradiction between the tragedy, the fiesta and the glory is the representation of the essential spirit of Argentina's story, also epitomized by our national heroes like, Eva Peron, Che Guevara, Carlos Gardel, and Diego Maradona."

What is different in Edelstein is his strong opposition to some nationalist academic folcloristas from Argentina, and also for some pseudo popular-folkloric musicians (who, as he has pointed out, can only understand these experiences in the European style – like tourists in their own land - and they make "folclore a la húngara" (Hungarian mode)). They look at Argentine popular folkloric music like someone looking at something through a window, or as Edelstein frequently says, "Like someone with a hooped-skirt in their brain." In his experience of the "velorio del angelito," he heard and absorbed the whole experience in all its emotional intensity – "I am a popular musician who has studied" – something which now gives him the ability to create space and textures in his complex musical language whilst retaining a strong connection with the impulse and imagination of the popular. In this way, he contributes to the increase of the stature and imagination of Argentine music, but more in the line of Heitor Villa-Lobos (Brazil), where he says that "the folkloric is me" – just as Borges "enhanced" the story of the orilleros and gauchos.

Alongside these experiences, the effect of a childhood spent close to a powerful river, in the province "between rivers," can also be said to have had a profound influence on his music, especially as Ortiz guided him to begin his study of art by first studying nature, including giving him Maurice Maeterlinck's books about bees and spiders.

=== "Composition in the Act" ===
His album in 2006 Dos Improntuswith renowned accordionist Raúl Barboza, was a meeting of different musical worlds. Edelstein intended that through playing together in a process of composition in the moment (rather than formally writing), he would create a new kind of synthesis of the Argentine experience and history of music. The disc has caused much discussion and is influencing musical culture in Argentina and Latin America, including being cited in various research works.

Other examples of Edelstein's kind of essential synthesis (but in these cases fully scored) are Tangos Cientificos [Scientific Tangos], Viril Occidente II, Klange Urutaú and La Teoría Sagrada del Espacio Acústico – Libro I with the ENS, O Tiempo, La Condena and Alma's Waltz. Alma's Waltz, written for his daughter, was composed to sound simple but is, in actuality, incredibly difficult to play − the idea being that only the man who could succeed in playing it could ask for his daughter's hand in marriage. The waltz has attained such popularity that many people do not know its author and believe that it is an anonymous traditional folk waltz - a fact that Edelstein greatly enjoys.

== Argentina & Andrómeda ==
Edelstein Photo by Daniel Karp

Edelstein is informed by the tradition of the Argentine intellectual avant-garde and as such many comparisons have been made to musicians, like Charles Ives, Karlheinz Stockhausen, Edgard Varèse and John Cage, but also to more popular or rock musicians like Hermeto Pascoal, Frank Zappa, and King Crimson. Edelstein says, "Critics and specialists sometimes make comparisons to try to explain me to others who don't know my work. I really appreciate their intent because we always understand in our own dimension. I know that I am not so "important" or popular, but I am sure that I am totally new."

Comparisons to Cage are often made because of his multi-disciplinary universe and his cutting-edge ideas; however, his music, in contrast to Cage', can be described as Maximilist.

Edelstein is seen as emerging from three sources; the tradition of the contemporary music of Argentina, in the line of composers who he very much appreciates, such as Juan Carlos Paz, Francisco Kröpfl, Carmelo Saitta, Gerardo Gandini, Mariano Etkin and many others; the popular musicians like Isaco Abitbol, Raúl Barboza, Remo Pignoni, Dino Saluzzi and Cuchi Leguizamón, to name but a few that he listened to whilst growing up; and equally to the colleagues and the composers of his generation that contributed to making the group Otras Musicas, including Pablo Di Liscia, Gustavo Mirabile and Daniel Montes. However, now, like Arnold Schönberg, Edelstein says, he learns most from his students, and the ENS (Ensamble Nacional del Sur) is an example of this.

Students have asked Edelstein if Stockhausen receives his influences from andrómeda, what radiation does he receive; he always replies with a smile, "Well, I am andrómeda!"

The scope of his artistic visions, which include a new system of composition, design of instruments, theory, notation and theatre, could be compared to a Wagnerian's ideal, but Edelstein insists that he is more Argentine and Latin American – in other words more innocent, imaginative, ironic and hopefully little less ridiculous. He says enigmatically, "In the classic Woody Allen joke, when you hear Wagner, you want to invade Poland. I hope when you hear my music, you want to do the hippo-campo dance." He goes on to say that it is hard for a European or for an Argentine formed in the classic European tradition of music to understand that life in the little province is spent between racing cars, poetry, music, horses, football, and women.

== New Techniques: Methods in Notation, Composition & Improvisation − Conducting as an Element of Composition ==
=== Research − Teatro Acústico / Acoustic Theatre ===
Edelstein is currently Senior professor, Head of Composition (Acoustic and Electro Acoustic), and Director of a research programme at the University of Quilmes, in 2006 his research programme into new musical theories and acoustic techniques, the Programa de investigación Teatro Acústico, won another landmark victory – it received funding from the Agencia de Promocion Científica y Tecnologica (a government agency that depends from the Argentinian Ministerio de Ciencia, Tecnología e Innovación Productiva, - the first time that a project in the arts has been awarded science funding and thus it was a breakthrough for Edelstein's research group. Working with a team of mathematicians, physicists, engineers, composers, and musicians, Edelstein is developing his original ideas for new materials, techniques, and approaches in spatial acoustics for theatre. His ideas of Acoustic Theatre include; a new system of control and notation of the acoustic space (The Acoustic Grid); entirely acoustic (non-electronic) techniques for a new system of composition; the creation a new kind of acoustic instrument (acousmonium); and the acoustic design of a new theatre. Edelstein's team is utilizing new materials based on the principle of sonic crystals to modulate the architecture of the acoustic space to add a new real-time parameter of control in a musical performance. Their research will make the space itself an instrument for the contemporary composer. The register of this work made in collaboration with the physicist, Manuel Eguía, has been produced in the University of Quilmes, Argentina, and the first international publication is in Germany in 2007.

=== Ensamble Nacional del Sur ===
His electro-acoustic group, the Ensamble Nacional del Sur (ENS for short), has achieved a cult following in both Brazil and Argentina. Created by Edelstein in 1997, as a working group of research, creation, and independent music production, they were conceived as a musical lab composed of musicians, composers, artists, and technicians. Edelstein works with systems of traditional notation combined with new and 3-dimensional models that he created. He conducts the group with his specially developed system of hand signals so that he can not only designate time and intensity but also timbral and spatial options. The members of the ENS are composers as well as musicians and thus could effectively respond to these directions. They have played in several Edelstein's acoustic theatre works, including the first part of the trilogy La Teoría Sagrada del Espacio Acoustico – Libro I (2000–2001); Klange, Klange, Urutau (1997) − described by Clarín's music critic Federico Monjeau as "an hour of music without interruptions, and without a moment of weakness"; and El Hecho (1998) which Monjeau called "a profound theatrical idea and fascinating music." Critic Martín Liut commented, "Oscar Edelstein opens new horizons for modern music and opera in Argentina." In 1999, Edelstein presented El Tiempo, La Condena in Brazil and Argentina; critics called the work a "shock of music and the avant-garde in the heart of Brazil." Their performances were considered as "the most important musical events of the last decade in Argentina ". Since its creation in 1997, Oscar Edelstein has brought together and trained many talented young musicians.

=== La Teoría Sagrada del Espacio Acoustico – Libro I ===
In 2004, La Teoría Sagrada del Espacio Acoustico – Libro I was recorded in Super Audio by the Ensamble Nacional del Sur. It was critically acclaimed and created considerable excitement as the first disc in Latin America to be recorded in Super Audio (5.1) and as the first work in the world to have been specifically composed for this system. Edelstein both conducted the ENS and played the piano alongside Mariano Cura (Keyboards / Technical Head), Nicolás Varchausky (Electric Guitar), Diego Romero Mascaró (Drums & Percussion), Mario Castelli (Piano), Jerónimo Carmona (Bass & Double Bass), and Richard Arce (Electric Guitar).

=== El Hecho [The Fact] ===
' El Hecho [The Fact]' (1998), due to its popularity and controversy, was performed over fifty times, which is unusual for a new opera. The work was made in memory of Juan Carlos Paz, inspired by Paz' graphic design, Seis eventos [Six Events]. This tribute to the teacher he never had stirred debate about the position and relationship between the composer and the academy of music. The work was described as "brilliant" and "the most important opera in the story of Argentina."

== Opera ==
Many of Edelstein's works are grounded in the field of "the extended theatre of music", where he stresses a focus on voice, speech production, and the interplay with technology. Often, he works with non-classically trained singers and choirs, training them to develop a specific sound color. He has a "guest choir" of voices that will often appear in his compositions. He prefers to describe his works as acoustic theatre, feeling that the word opera does not fit many of his works that use electroacoustics and not the traditional orchestra. The two most recent works are 'La Carta Imaginaria' (2014) - commissioned by the Ministerio de Cultura de la Nación for the Ciclo Iberoamericano de Ópera Contemporánea, and El Caballo Fantasma (2011) - multimedia musical performance commissioned by the Ministerio de Cultura de la Nación.

=== Eterna Flotación - Los monstruito (2006) ===
In 2006, C.E.T.C., the experimental wing of Buenos Aires' opera house, Teatro Colón, commissioned and produced his opera Eterna Flotación-Los monstruito. As often is the case in his works, the libretto was written by Edelstein, this time adapting poems from Lo Dado by Rodolfo Enrique Fogwill. The Clarín reviewed it as "Original, innovative – some pieces are like from the anthology of opera." It was the first musical work to speak about the presidency of Carlos Menem. In the middle of scenes depicting the incredible decadence that Argentina fell into, Edelstein has a 'murga' – a street-musical group common in Uruguay and Argentina often present at political protests – erupt into the theatre, cutting across conventional lines of opera as a "high" art. The final aria of the work is Edelstein's setting of "El Rio," a poem by Juan L. Ortiz, that he uses to contrast with the scenes of decadence and decay.

=== Tiradentes (2003) ===
Having written over 14 works of what Edelstein prefers to call Acoustic Theatre − it is "Tiradentes" that is perhaps the most noteworthy for its scale and vision. With the subtitle, "The Dream of Heroes" it was the first opera to speak about a figure who Edelstein calls "Brazil's only real national hero", "Tiradentes" was an opera to take place over three days, about the man who led a revolt "La conspiración de Minas Gerais." Way before the French Revolution, it was the first act of self-determination in Brazil, which many years later contributed to Brazil's independence, which happened much later than the rest of Latin America. As a joint project between the universities of Quilmes (Argentina) and Brasília (Brazil), it was to be staged throughout Brasília's model city. The complex project involved a team of more than two hundred actors, plastic artists, technicians, and musicians from both countries, and received the backing of UNESCO and funding from prominent foundations. However, the project was ultimately postponed by a combination of factors, including the controversy that the history of Tiradentes provoked (such as Tiradentes' known links to the freemasons), political and diplomatic problems between Argentina and Brazil, and political issues in Brazil. Though it is a project that was fully conceived, composed, and scored by Edelstein, finally, only part of it was performed. Edelstein hopes to one day complete the project.

== Orchestral ==
In recent years, Edelstein has decided to return to writing for orchestra. In 2010, this decision led to a commission from Orquesta Sinfónica Nacional, under the direction of Pedro Ignacio Calderón, with the soloist Eduardo Isaac Guitá,.a andalled "La Foto Del Tiempo." Then in 2011 came a commission from Basel Sinfonietta leading to "Cristal Argento I" and a premiere conducted by José Luis Gomez - who had just won first prize in the International Conductor's Competition of Sir Georg Solti at the Alte Oper in Frankfurt, and went gone on to be in 2016 the new musical director of the Tucson Symphony Orchestra. Both works used live electronic processing. Edelstein has a new major orchestral work in process.

== Other recent works ==
- La Calesa en la Luna (2015) - Saxophone quartet
- La Carta Imaginaria (2014) - Opera commissioned by the Ministerio de Cultura de la Nación for the Ciclo Iberoamericano de Ópera Contemporánea
- El Caballo Fantasma (2011) - Multimedia musical performance commissioned by the Ministerio de Cultura de la Nación
- ION (2007) - for piano with an accompanying film.
- Rivers and Mirrors: Part I (2007) - piano, voice, and video. Edelstein uses his aria, "El Rio", again in his work Rivers and Mirrors: Part I with singer Deborah Claire Procter (Wale, who whoalso made the film to accompany the performance with the dancer Sandra Grinberg of the Trisha Brown Dance Company. This recital, in which Edelstein plays the piano, was premiered in the UK in 2007 to an enthusiastic response from audiences and critics. WhereEdelstein's piano technique was described as "formidable".

== Press ==
- Garcia, Jorge (14 December 2014). "Oscar Edelstein y El Ensamble Nacional Del Sur (Review)". El Amante.
- Marín, Carlos (14 December 2014). "Oscar Edelstein, un compositor en los bordes del sistema establecido". El Diario, Paraná.
- "El Destino Guardado En La Carta Imaginaria". La Nación. 21 June 2014.
- Fischerman, Diego (20 June 2014). "Sobre el destino y la repetición". Página 12.
- Marín, Carlos (17 December 2013). "No sirvo para funcionar como maestro estatua". El Diario, Paraná.
- "El río, protagonista en una muestra multidisciplinar". Telam. 18 January 2013. Archived from the original on 5 July 2023.
- Fischerman, Diego (15 August 2012). "Sacar a los músicos de sus casillas". Página 12.
- "Paraná Ra'anga. Itinerancia". El Litoral, Paraná. 22 March 2012.
- Marín, Carlos (15 December 2011). "Edelstein, premiado por el Fondo Nacional de las Artes". El Diario, Paraná.
- Walker, Gustavo Fernandez (15 October 2011). "La revista que cambio la critica musical argentina". La Nación.
- Monjeau, Federico (23 August 2011). "Un Sonido Distintivo". Clarín.
- Gianera, Pablo (7 August 2011). "Alegoría sobre el ser nacional". La Nación.
- Fischerman, Diego (6 August 2011). "Un Viaje de Sonido". Página 12.
- Apicella, Mauro (23 July 2011). "Operas son las de ahora". La Nación.
- Marín, Carlos (5 June 2011). "El Ensamble Nacional del Sur ofreció una experiencia estética provocadora e inquietante". El Diario, Paraná. Archived from the original on 22 April 2016.
- Marín, Carlos (29 May 2011). "La Peluca de Voltaire". El Diario, Paraná.
- Thiele, Alfred (17 February 2011). "Südamerikanische Musik unserer Tage, faszinierend und aufrüttelnd". Südwestpresse.
- Liut, Martín (28 August 2010). "Edelstein, de Estreno en Basilea". La Nación.
- Fluri, Christian (26 January 2011). "Mitreissende Rhythmen und vitale Klänge". Basellandschaftliche Zeitung.
- Schweizer, Klaus (26 January 2011). "Eine veritable mambo-musik-maschine". Basler Zeitung.
- Frey, Roswitha (26 January 2011). "Der "Einspringer" erwies sich als Glücksfall". Badische Zeitung.
- Marín, Carlos (23 January 2011). "Un Cristal Argento Que Señala Un Rumbo Al Provenir". El Diario.
- Monjeau, Federico (9 January 2011). "De Quilmes a Basilea". Clarín.
- Fischerman, Diego (9 January 2011). "La Peluca de Voltaire". Página 12.
- Gilbert, Abel (2011). "A New and Very Malleable Instrument". Revista Otra Parte. Archived from the original on 22 March 2016.
- "La ciencia musical llega a La Plata". Diario Hoy. 2010.
- "Gala De Oro en La Noche de Los Cien Años Del Teatro". El Diario. 2010.
- Liut, Martín (28 August 2010). "Un Magma en Movimiento". Clarín.
- "Oscar Edelstein, un músico de vanguardia en la costa correntina". El Litoral. 28 March 2010.
- Marín, Carlos (15 March 2010). "La mejor forma de decirlo de una manera diferente". El Diario.
- "Quienes Son Los Expedicionarios - Artes Y Oficios". Página12. 2 February 2010.
- Marín, Carlos (2 February 2010). "Oscar Edelstein, compositor". El Diario.
- Gianera, Pablo (20 September 2009). "La Compactera - Cinco Estudios Para La Grilla Acústica Libro II". La Nación.
- Monjeau, Federico (8 August 2009). "Música ficción y tribalismo". Clarín.
- "Una aventura original". Página12. 2 July 2009.
- "Orquestra poco tipica". Perfil. 22 November 2008.
- "Gala por el centenario del Teatro 3 de Febrero". El Diario. 18 October 2008.
- "Cien años de una sala bellísima". La Nación. 18 October 2008.
- "Velada de lujo para celebrar el centenario del Municipal". Diario El Litoral. 11 October 2008.
- "En tono - Paranaenses ilustres". Clarín. 11 October 2008.
- "Homenajean a Oscar Edelstein". Diario el Sol, Quilmes. 6 October 2008.
- "Y soy el mar si es necesario". Uno. 21 September 2008.
- "Murio Karlheinz Stockhausen - Miradas locales". La Nación. 8 December 2007.
- Price, Karen (4 April 2007). "Merging film, piano and computer". Western Mail, Cardiff.
- Gianera, Pablo (3 March 2007). "Por la senda de Atahualpa". Perfil.
- Solare, Juan María (2007). "El Hallador Afortunado (Interview". Orpheotron.
- Plaza, Gabriel (22 December 2006). "Un choque de dos planetas musicales". La Nación.
- Monjeau, Federico (22 September 2006). "Dos poemas y una ópera". Clarín.
- Montero, Juan Carlos (19 September 2006). "Poética sobre la degradación social". La Nación.
- Kohan, Pablo (17 September 2006). "Una ópera verdadera". La Nación.
- Plaza, Gabriel (17 September 2006). "Monstruos Acuáticos". Perfil.
- Fischerman, Diego (17 September 2006). "A mí me interesa la sobresaturación". Página 12.
- Monjeau, Federico (22 September 2006). "Yendo de la poesía a la ópera". Clarín.
- "Sonidos en el espacio". La Nación. 8 August 2004.
- Fischerman, Diego (27 August 2004). "No se puede dejar de lado lo que golpea el alma". Página 12.
- Monjeau, Federico (14 August 2004). "Volúmenes musicales". Clarín.
- Liut, Martín (10 July 2004). "Musica en 6 canales". La Nación.
- Liut, Martín (27 June 2004). "Argentinos y vanguardistas". La Nación.
- Monjeau, Federico (4 July 2004). "Dos discos clave". Clarín.
- Monjeau, Federico (30 May 2004). "El sueno de los heroes". Clarín.
- "Entre la creación y la labor como docente". La Nación. 30 December 2003.
- Liut, Martín (30 December 2003). "El nuevo trabajo de Oscar Edelstein". La Nación.
- Monjeau, Federico (21 December 2002). "Salir del Laboratorio". Clarín.
- Cabrera, Hilda (21 December 2002). "Los que componemos jugamos con todos los limites de la expresión (Interview)". Página 12.
- Liut, Martín (21 December 2002). "Creación que tiene "pulmones acústicos". La Nación.
- Liut, Martín (19 March 2002). "'Opera Argentina en Brasilia". La Nación.
- "Romper estructuras sigue siendo la clave del ensamble". Fabril. 9 December 2000.
- "Compositor Argentino Pesquisa Acustica". Correio Braziliense. 10 October 2000.
- "Encontro cenico-musical". Jornal de Brasília. 29 September 2000.
- Monjeau, Federico (9 September 2000). "Un laboratorio musical en vivo". Clarín.
- Liut, Martín (10 September 2000). "Musica con tracción a sangre". La Nación.
- Liut, Martín (7 September 2000). "Entre la inspiración y la tecnología". La Nación.
- Monjeau, Federico (11 August 2000). "Maldita Estereofonía". Clarín.
- Cortinas, Fernanda Gonzalez (11 August 2000). "El ENS o la dimension metafisica de la musica". Rosario 12.
- "Dias de radio". Radar. 7 November 1999.
- Monjeau, Federico (22 December 1998). "Turbulencias". Clarín.
- Fischerman, Diego (15 December 1998). "Una memoria para muchos desbalances". Página 12.
- Liut, Martín (3 December 1998). "La vanguardia musical llega por triplicado". La Nación.
- Gilbert, Abel (1 December 1998). "Musica en conflicto". Tres Puntos.
- Fischerman, Diego (1 December 1998). "En época de guerra cultural hay que actuar como un ejercito". Página 12.
- "Tres días de nueva música - Experimenta ´98". La Nación. 17 October 1998.
- "Quise liberar, a Juan Carlos Paz de los sistemas teóricas". La Maga. 1 July 1998.
- Liut, Martín (28 June 1998). "El ultimo adios a Juan Carlos Paz". La Nación.
- Monjeau, Federico (20 June 1998). "El enigmático señor Paz". Clarín.
- "Incertidumbres en torno al nuevo ciclo internacional - Experimenta '98". Clarín. 31 May 1998.
- Monjeau, Federico (31 July 1997). "Música, improvisación y poesía". Clarín.
- Liut, Martín (17 July 1997). "Brasil-Argentina, en Experimenta". La Nación.
- Godoy, Leandro (31 July 1997). "Reportaje a Oscar Edelstein".
- "Musica y tecnología". La Nación. 28 August 1994.
- Monjeau, Federico (20 September 1992). "De la electro acustica a la opera". Clarín.
- Monjeau, Federico (23 January 1991). "Virilidad y Guerra Fría". Página 12.
- Monjeau, Federico (15 March 1987). "Una mirada a los papeles del maestro". La Razón.
