= Rodolfo Enrique Fogwill =

Argentine author and businessman (1941-2010)

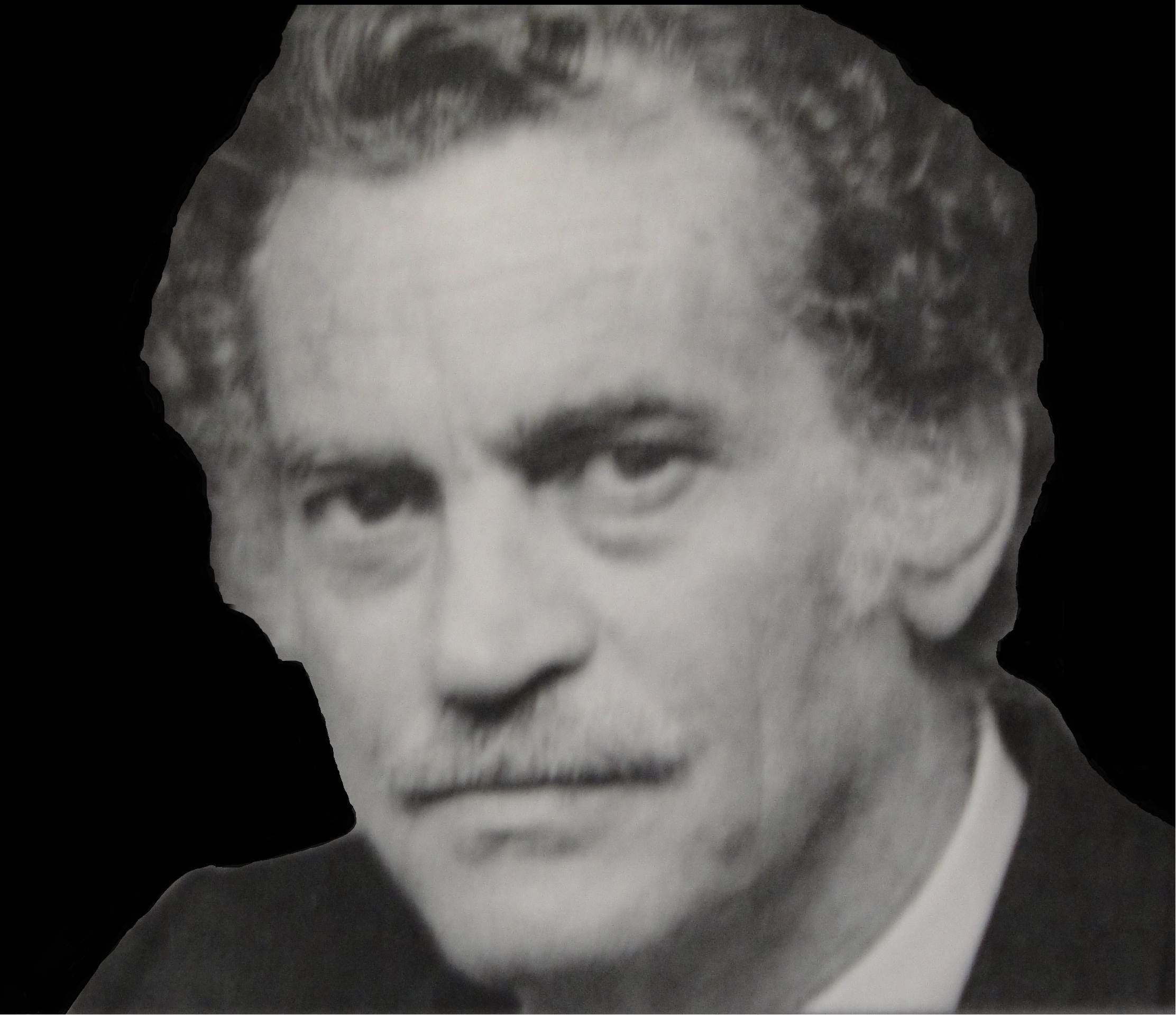
Rodolfo Enrique Fogwill

Rodolfo Enrique Fogwill (July 15, 1941 – August 21, 2010), who normally went only by his surname, Fogwill, was an Argentine short story writer, novelist, and businessman. He was a distant relative of the novelist Charles Langbridge Morgan. He was the author of Malvinas Requiem, one of the first narratives to deal with the Falklands War. Fogwill died on August 21, 2010, from a pulmonary dysfunction.

== Biography ==
Fogwill was born in Buenos Aires, and became a professor at the University of Buenos Aires. He published a poetry book collection; he was an essayist and a columnist specializing in communications subjects, literature, and cultural politics. The success of his story "Muchacha punk" (Punk Girl), which received the first prize in a literary contest in 1980, allowed him to leave his job as a businessman, and began what he called "a plot of misunderstandings and misfortunes" that led him to become a writer.

Some of his stories have appeared in anthologies in the United States, Cuba, Mexico, and Spain. He is particularly notable for the short novel Malvinas Requiem (Los pichiciegos), which was one of the first narratives to deal with the Falklands War between Argentina and the United Kingdom, and is written from the point of view of young Argentine conscripts. More generally, Erin Graff Zivin notes that in much of his work, Fogwill is concerned with "marginal subjects": in Vivir afuera, for instance, these include "'Jews,' HIV-positive patients, drug addicts, prostitutes, and impoverished artists."

== Malvinas Requiem ==
The critic María A. Duran calls Fogwill's Malvinas Requiem "a masterful and disillusioned story of an absurd war." Famously, it was begun before the war had even ended, and finished only a week later, product of a seventy-two-hour writing binge without sleep, fuelled by cocaine. The Argentine critic Martín Kohan compares the book's publication to an earthquake: "you would have to measure it on the Richter scale."

The book's plot concerns a group of Argentine deserters during the final weeks of the land war on the Islands. They have carved out a cave and a small network of tunnels somewhere in No Man's Land and hunker down as the weather worsens and winter beckons. The men call themselves "pichiciegos," after a small armadillo native to Argentina. To survive, they scavenge from the battlefield, steal from the Argentine army, and barter with the British. Occasionally they see (or think they see) extraordinary sights around them. In the end, the majority of the pichiciegos die, suffocated by carbon monoxide as the advancing snow blocks their cave's ventilation. Only one survives, and we gradually learn that he is telling his story to the novel's narrator, back in Buenos Aires.

== Collaborations ==
In 2006 Centre for Experimentation (CETC) of Teatro Colón proposed that as a national poet Rodolfo Enrique Fogwill work with the composer of his choice. He chose avantgarde composer Oscar Edelstein who went on to make the script for "Eterna Flotación-Los monstruito from two poems of Fogwill, "Contra el Cristal de La Pecera de Acuario" ("Against the Glass of the Aquarium") " and "El Antes de los Monstruito" ("Before the Monsters") from his book "Lo Dado" ("The Given"), transforming the two poems into a continuous discourse that functions as a dramatic text. It was the first musical work to speak about the presidency of Carlos Menem. The opera depicted the incredible decadence into which Argentina fell which led to economic collapse and a series of economic problems have been referred to as the “Tango Crisis.” "The Festival of the Monsters" was a short story written by Jorge Luis Borges and Adolfo Bioy Casares and it is with this in mind that Fogwill referred to "the monsters" in his book of poems "Lo Dado" ("The Given"). In Edelstein's opera he creates two protagonists, Monstruo I (Juan Peltzer - Baritone), and Monstruo II (Lucas Werenkraut -Tenor).

This was the second collaboration between Fogwill and Oscar Edelstein, the first being in 1997 where in Edelstein's work "Klange, Klange Urutaú" Fogwill translated and recorded a poem of Fernando Pessoa. The music critic Federico Monjeau described the reading as "expressive and strange."

== Novels ==
- Malvinas Requiem: Visions of an Underground War (Translator Nick Caistor. Publisher, Serpent's Tail, 2007 (Los pichiciegos, 1983)
- The Good New (La buena nueva, 1990)
- A Pale History of Love (Una pálida historia de amor, 1991)
- To Live Outside (Vivir afuera, 1998)
- Songs of Sailors in the Pampas (Cantos de marineros en las pampas, 1998), anthology
- La experiencia sensible (2001)
- En otro orden de cosas (2002)
- Urbana (2003)
- Runa (2003)
- Un guion para Artkino (2009)
- Nuestro modo de vida (2014) (posthumous)
- La introducción (2016) (posthumous)

== Short stories ==
- My Dead Punks (Mis muertos punk, 1980)
- Japanese music (Música japonesa, 1982),
- Imaginary Armies (Ejércitos imaginarios, 1983)
- Birds of the Head (Pájaros de la cabeza, 1985)
- Punk Girl (Muchacha punk, 1992)
- Diurnal Remains (Restos diurnos, 1993)
- Cuentos completos (2009)

== Poems ==
- The Effect of Reality (El efecto de realidad, 1979)
- The Hours of Appointments (Las horas de citas, 1980)
- Parts of the Whole (Partes del todo, 1990)
- The Given ("Lo dado", 2001)
- Canción de paz (2003)
- Últimos movimientos (2004)
- Poesía completa (2016)
