= Enns =

Enns or ENNS may refer to:

- Enns (town), Upper Austria, Austria
- Enns (river), a southern tributary of the Danube River
- Enns (surname)
- Enns-class river monitor, two ships of the Austro-Hungarian Navy
- European Neural Network Society (ENNS)
