= Mariano Etkin =

Argentine composer (1943–2016)

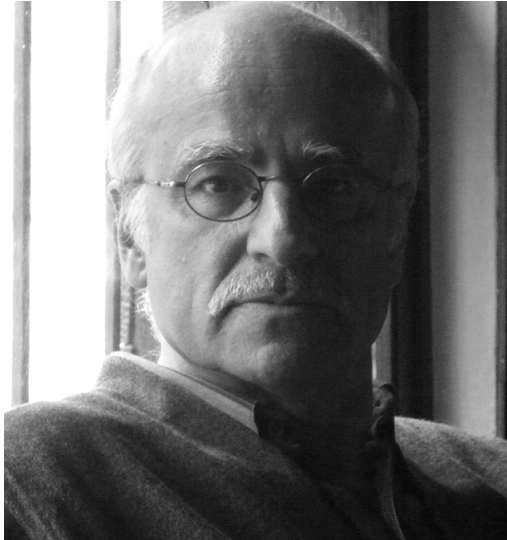
Composer Mariano Etkin

Mariano Etkin (1943–2016) was an Argentine composer.

== Life ==
Etkin was born in Buenos Aires. He studied with Guillermo Graetzer, Maurice Le Roux and Gerardo Gandini. And, at the Utrecht University, with Gottfried Michael Koenig, and also at the Juilliard School with Luciano Berio (under an Organization of American States fellowship).

In parallel to its education as a composer, he studied conducting with Paul Hupperts at the Conservatory of Utrecht (scholarship from the OEA and the Government of the Netherlands) and with Pierre Boulez at the Music Academy of Basel (Switzerland).

He was Head Professor of Composition and Director of a Research Project on Analysis of New Music at the National University of La Plata. Previous posts included a visiting positions at McGill University, at the Royal Conservatory of The Hague, and at Wilfrid Laurier University.

== Works ==
He has received commissions from Radio Deutschlandfunk, Radio Bremen, Freiburger Schlagzeug Ensemble, Ensemble Aventure (Germany); Festival Neue Musik Ruemlingen (Switzerland); Composers/Performers Group of New York, Fundación Música AntiquaNova and the City of Buenos Aires. He had received several awards including the Composition Prize of the Fondo Nacional de las Artes (Argentina) and the Composition Prize of the City of Buenos Aires.

His compositions are performed in Canada, United States of America, Europe and most Latin American countries, at important Festivals and Concert Series. As World Music Days (held in Toronto, Amsterdam, Oslo and Essen) organized by the International Society of Contemporary Music (ISCM); NovAntiqua Köln; Musica Nova Series, Leipzig; Èclat, Stuttgart; Latin-American Festivals in Mexico, La Habana and Caracas, among others.

== List of compositions ==
- Tres piezas, for piano solo (1959).
- Interludios, for piano solo (1959).
- Variantes, for flute (1960).
- Quinteto aleatorio, for wind quintet (1961).
- Tres parábolas, for chamber ensemble (1963).
- Elipses, for string orchestra (1964).
- Entropías, for two horns, trumpet, two trombones and tuba(1965).
- Estáticamóvil I, for two trombones, harpsichord, harmonium, two percussion players and three doublebasses (1966).
- Homenaje a Filidor forrado de niño (based on the work by Witold Gombrowicz) for two flutes, two clarinets and percussion (1966).
- Estáticamóvil II, for violin, viola and cello (1966).
- Soles, for flute, horn and doublebass (1967).
- Distancias, for piano solo (1968)
- Juego uno, for two trombones (1969).
- Muriendo entonces, for horn, trombone, tuba, two percussion players, amplified viola and amplified doublebass (1969).
- IRT-BMT, for flute and doublebass (1970).
- Dividido dos, for amplified accordion and tape (1971).
- Copla, for flute, clarinet, bassoon and horn (1971).
- Música ritual, for orchestra (1974).
- Otros soles, for bass clarinet, trombone and viola (1976).
- Umbrales, for flute and alto flute (1976).
- Lo uno y lo otro, for piano solo (1977).
- Otros tiempos, for string quintet or string orchestra (1978, revised in 1981).
- Paisaje, for string orchestra (1979).
- Aquello, for two pianos (1982).
- Frente a frente, for flute, clarinet, voice, percussion and doublebass (1983).
- Caminos de cornisa, for flute, clarinet, piano and percussion (1985).
- Resplandores sombras, for orchestra (1986).
- Recóndita armonía, for viola, cello and doublebass (1987).
- Arenas (a la memoria de Morton Feldman), for piano solo (1988).
- Caminos de caminos, for alto flute, bass clarinet, voice, piano and viola (1989).
- Perpetual tango (version from a piece by John Cage), for piano solo (1989).
- Locus solus, for two percussion players (1989).
- Trío, for trumpet, trombone and tuba (1991).
- Cifuncho, for violin (1992).
- Abgesang mambo, for flute (C, alto and bass), oboe, English horn, clarinet (and bass), bassoon, horn, trumpet, trombone and doublebass (1992).
- Taltal, for four percussion players (1993).
- La sangre del cuerpo, for tenor-bass trombone, alto trombone, percussion, piano, cello and doublebass (1997).
- Lo que nos va dejando, for one percussion player (1998).
- De la indiferencia, for bass clarinet, trombone, percussion, violin and cello (1998).
- Sotobosque, for horn, flugelhorn, alto trombone, tuba and two percussion players (1999).
- La naturaleza de las cosas, for clarinet, trombone, cello and piano (2001).
- Pobres triunfos pasajeros, for piano solo (2002).
- Cifuncho, for viola (2002).
- Trío, for three percussion players (2003).
- Cinco poemas de Samuel Beckett, for bass clarinet, trombone, percussion, violin, cello and speaker (2005).
- Flores blancas, for clarinet, bassoon, trombone, percussion, piano, cello and doublebass (2006).
- Estuche de lágrimas, for guitar (2006).
- Primer estudio para lágrimas, for clarinet, horn and cello (2009).
- Segundo estudio para lágrimas, for clarinet, horn and cello (2009).
- Lamento por James Avery, for two violins, cello and doublebass (2009).
- Composition 2010 No. 1a (Richard, La Monte y Arnold en Solitude), for two mezzo-sopranos, two altos, two baritones and two basses.
- Composition 2010 No. 1b (Richard, La Monte y Arnold en Solitude), for two sopranos, mezzo-soprano, contratenor/baritone and bass.
- Tercer estudio para lágrimas, for horn and doublebass (2010).
- Alte Steige, for clarinet, trumpet and trombone (2012).
- Vocales, for baritone and piano (2013).
- Sueños olvidados, for violin, viola and cello (2014).
- Lágrimas sobre lágrimas, for piano solo (2015).
- Lágrimas, for orchestra (2016).
