= Ens (river) =

River in Germany

Location
- Country: Germany
- State: Bavaria

Physical characteristics
- Mouth
  - location: Aisch
  - coordinates: 49.4818°N 10.3800°E

Basin features
- Progression: Aisch→ Regnitz→ Main→ Rhine→ North Sea

Ens is a small river of Bavaria, Germany. It flows into the Aisch in Illesheim.

== See also ==
- List of rivers of Bavaria
