= Enns (surname) =

Enns is a surname. Notable people with the surname include:

- Dietrich Enns (born 1991), American baseball player
- Harry Enns (1931–2010), Canadian politician
- Leonard Enns (born 1948), Canadian classical music composer
- Paul P. Enns (born 1937), American theologian and biblical scholar
- Peter Enns (born 1961), American theologian
- Siegfried Enns (1924–2020), Canadian politician
