= Entz =

Entz is a surname. Notable people with the surname include:

- Justus B. Entz (1867–1947), American electrical engineer and inventor
- Lewis Entz (1931–2025), American politician and farmer
- Matt Entz (born 1971), American college football coach
