= Ensamble Nacional del Sur =

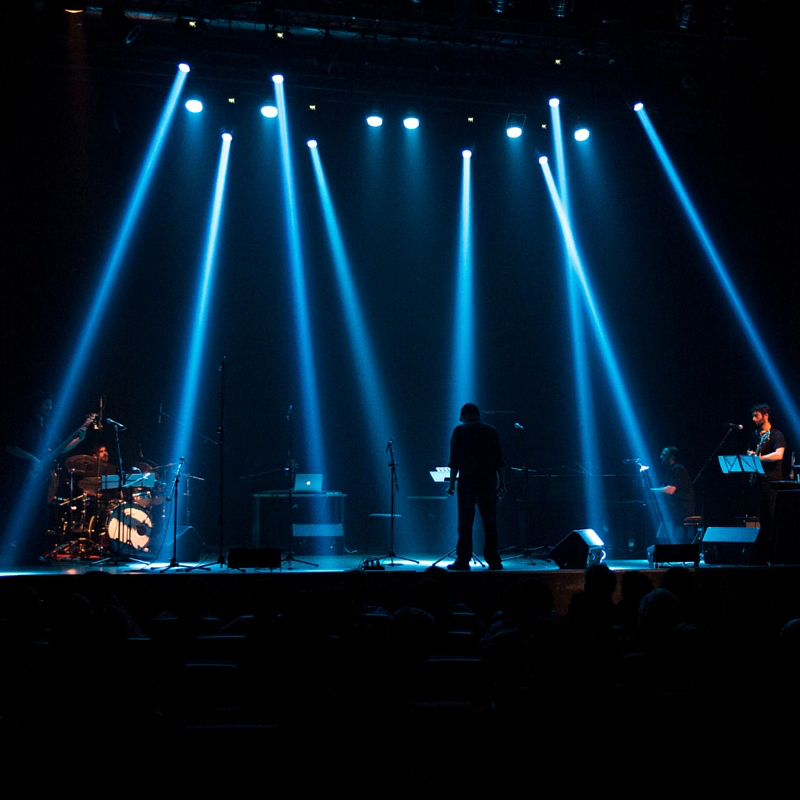

Background information
- Origin: Buenos Aires, Argentina
- Genres: Contemporary classical
- Years active: 1997–present
- Website: ensbuenosaires.com

The Ensamble Nacional del Sur (ENS) is an electro-acoustic ensemble located in Buenos Aires, which specialises in contemporary classical music.

The ensemble was founded by composer and conductor Oscar Edelstein in 1997 as a group of research, creation, and independent music production. Now in its third generation of musicians, the group has performed many times in a number of Edelstein's acoustic theatre works, including El Caballo Fantasma (2012), the first part of the trilogy La Teoría Sagrada del Espacio Acoustico – Libro I (2000–2001) which according to Edelstein is about "the conflict between religion and technology, or if you wish, between creation and technology", Klange, Klange, Urutau (1997) and El Hecho (1994).

== 3D scores ==
Edelstein conducts the musicians with a new system 3-dimensional models that he has created. With this specially developed system of hand signals he can designate timbrical and spatial options as well as time and intensity. All the ENS are composers as well as musicians so can respond with high precision to Edelstein's directions, to the point that it is as if his hands have censors attached to the musicians.

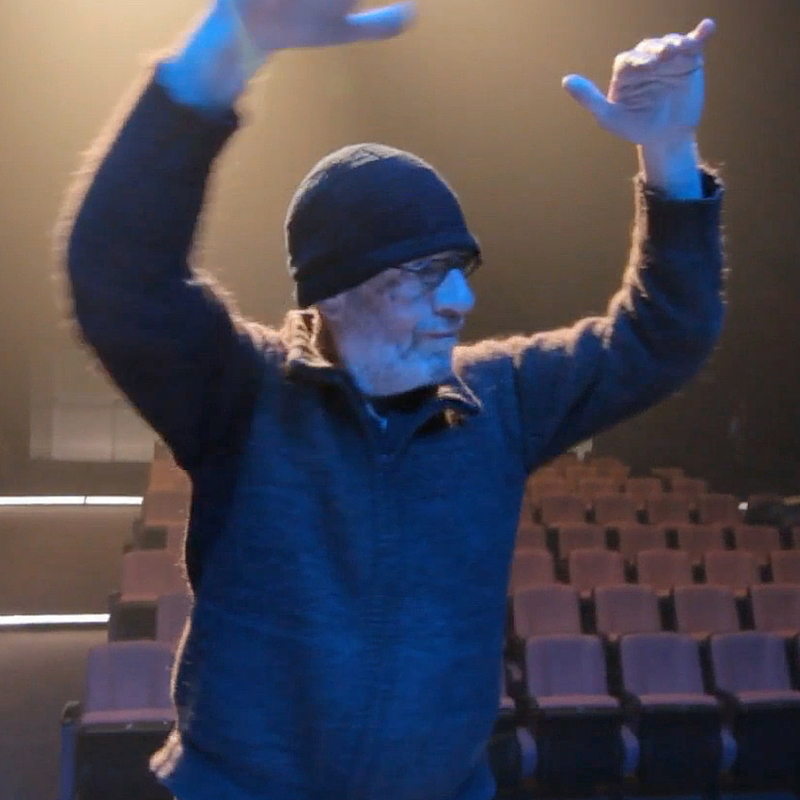
Oscar Edelstein Conducting in Rehearsal "Ensamble Nacional Del Sur"

Edelstein's use of rhythm with the group has been compared to Ionisation by Edgar Varèse. Critic often praise the originality of the group; "It’s impossible to pigeonhole and classify that which knocks down genres yet at the same time contains all of them within something new."

They were the first group in Latin America to record an album in Super Audio 5:1.

The ENS have gained a cult reputation in Argentina and Brasil, presenting their works in a wide variety of music venues, cultural centres and theatres; Teatro Nacional (Brasilia); Centro Cultural Kirchner, Goethe-Institut, Sala Caras y Caretas, Teatro San Martín, Centro Cultural Ricardo Rojas, Teatro Payró; El Galpón del Abasto, La Trastienda, Casa de la Cultura del FNA, Centro Nacional de la Música (Buenos Aires); Auditorio Nicolás Cassullo (Quilmes); Teatro Argentino (La Plata); Centro Parque España (Rosario); Teatro 3 de Febrero (Paraná); Auditorio Bustelo (Mendoza); & Auditorio del CePIA, Facultad de Artes (Córdoba).

== Discography ==
- Estudios sobre La Grilla Acústica / Studies for the Acoustic Grid (2014)

Recorded with the current members of the ENS and special guest recording artists Marcelo Moguilevsky (Clarinet) and Ernesto Jodos (Piano). The two discs are accompanied by a book explaining the compositional techniques of Edelstein. The disc received excellent reviews including the following from Diego Fischerman for Página 12 who wrote "From the most tenuous and crystalline, up to the real explosion, it is a fundamental disc, for its importance and originality but, especially, for its power of communication.”

- Sacred Theory of the Acoustic Space - Book I (2004)

The work was recorded in real time according to the musicians stage performance, following the indications in the score, and without any processes of edition or assembling. The resulting spatial structures are the product of the development of timbrical, rhythms and/or dynamic curves produced by the performers, placed in fixed positions. The piece uses its own system of 3D notation, which includes a non-conventional musical conducting code. Martín Liut (La Nación) said, "With the ENS, Edelstein has found an "instrument" capable of making electro acoustic music, but with the traction of blood. The complex polyrhythmic textures and tímbres are the launch platform for the exploration of the space in three dimensions, an obsession that, now, Edelstein can record in a top format (5:1).”

== Current members ==
- Oscar Edelstein - Piano, Composition, Direction
- Axel Lastra – Piano & Keyboards
- Leonardo Salzano - Electric & Prepared Guitar
- Pablo Torterolo – Drums
- Mauro Zannoli – Keyboards & Electronic Processes
- Alfonso Ollúa - Electric Bass

== Guest musicians ==
- Deborah Claire Procter - Vocals
- Martin Proscia - Saxophone

== Past members ==
- Richard Arce - Electric Guitar
- Diego Romero Mascaró - Drums
- Gerónimo Carmona - Electric & Acoustic Bass
- Mario Castelli - Acoustic Piano
- Mariano Cura - Keyboards
- Matías Gonzalez Goytia - Drums
- Gonzalo Serrano - Electric & Acoustic Bass
- Pablo Siroti - Percussion
- Nicolás Varchausky - Electric Guitar
