= Environment News Service =

The Environment News Service (ENS), referred to as ENS, is an environmental news agency which provides original late-breaking news reports. First published on January 1, 1990, ENS is based in the United States.

ENS is privately owned and operated by founding publisher and editor in chief Sunny P. Lewis.

Contributors from across the USA and around the world cover issues and events that affect the environment. ENS reports are often picked up by other news outlets and cited in books and magazines.

ENS has won four Project Censored awards for investigative journalism, an honor presented by Sonoma State University in California.

The ENS press release distribution division, World-Wire, also based in the United States, is privately owned and operated by founder Jim Crabtree. It transmits press releases for environmental and sustainable business clients to TV and radio stations, newspapers, wire services, corporate and nongovernmental executives as well as government offices in the United States and many other countries.

The Environment News Service is notable for providing a reporter on the ground for an international audience in the Gulf War. They have provided a news wire service since 1990.
