= National University of Quilmes =

Coordinates: 34°42′24″S 58°16′39″W

- Universidad Nacional de Quilmes
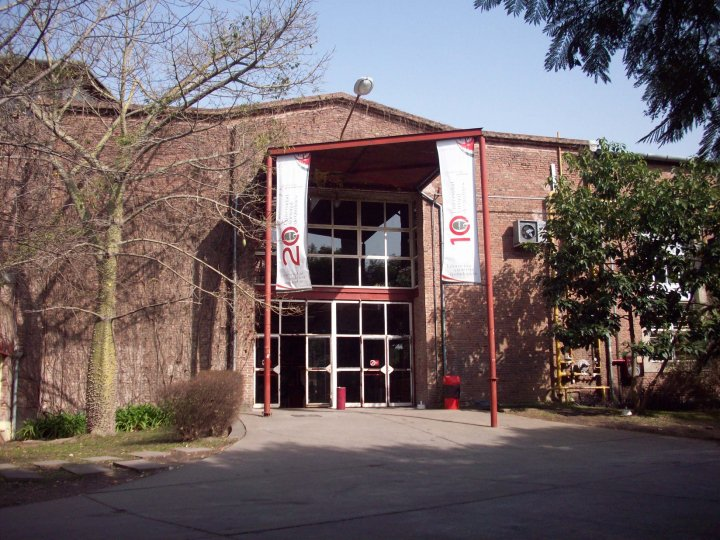
- Type: Public
- Established: 1989; 36 years ago
- President: Mg. Alfredo Alfonso
- Vice-president: Phd. María Alejandra Zinni
- Students: 43,000
- Location: Bernal, Buenos Aires, Argentina
- Campus: Urban
- Website: unq.edu.ar
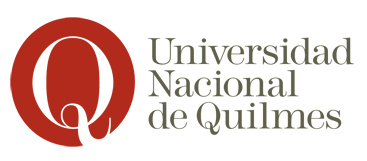

The National University of Quilmes (Spanish: Universidad Nacional de Quilmes, UNQui) is an Argentine national university and the most important one in the Quilmes area.

The National University of Quilmes was founded on October 23, 1989. Located in Bernal (Quilmes County), it serves the Southern Buenos Aires Metropolitan Area, home to three million people and 20% of the country's industrial establishments.

The UNQ has over thirty thousand students, distributed among its undergraduate courses and graduate courses of study. The university maintains 18 undergraduate programs (including seven through its virtual university program established in 1998), as well as four master's degree programs and two doctorates (Applied Sciences and Social Sciences).

The university's stated mission is to teach in an environment of equality and diversity. Its essential functions are teaching, research, extension courses, human resources formation, technological development, productive innovation and culture promotion.

The institution operates through a departmental structure. The Social Sciences and the Science and Technology Departments, along with the Study and Research Center, provide teachers and researchers for the various diploma and degree courses of study taught at the university.

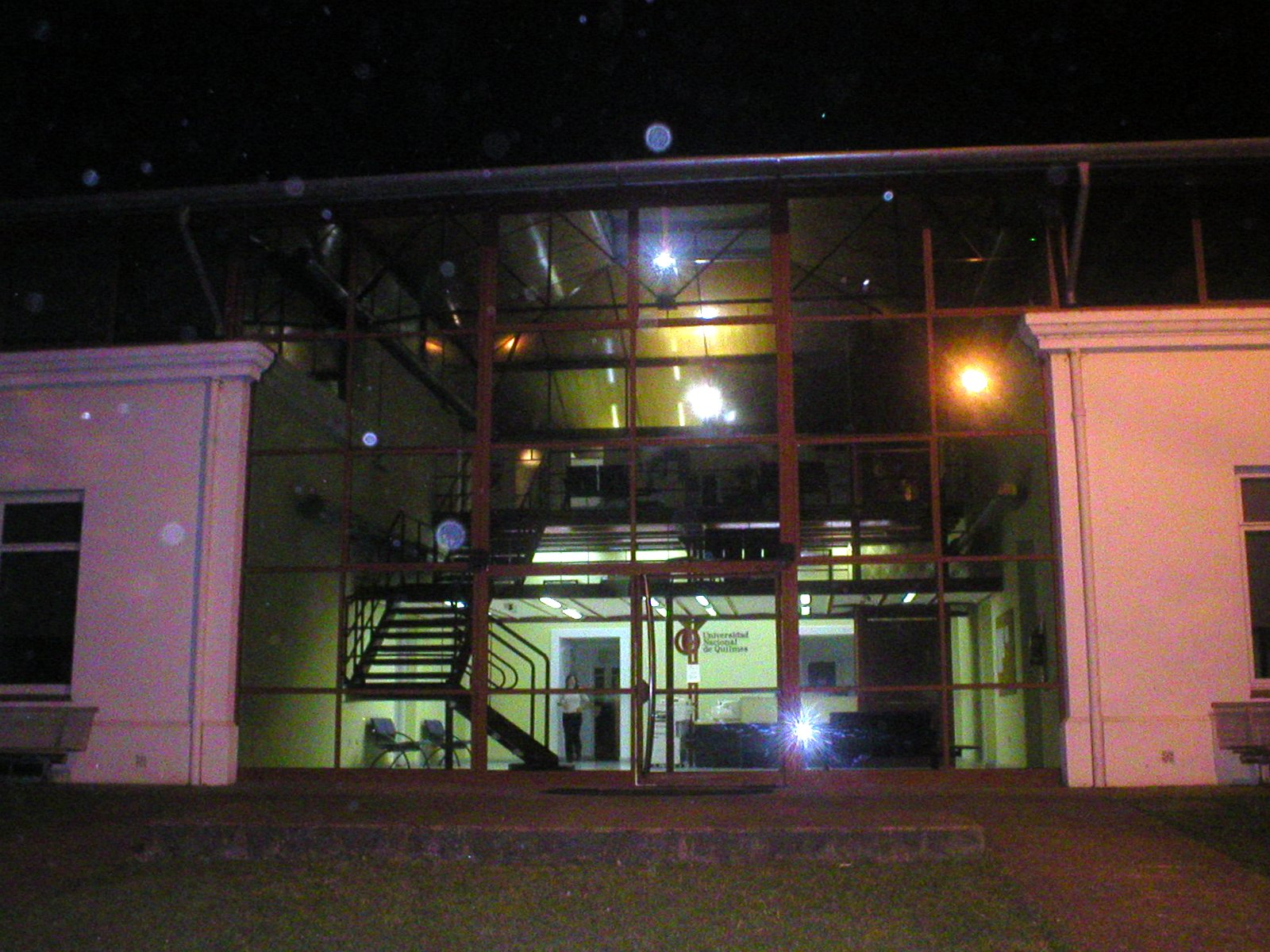
Administrative offices

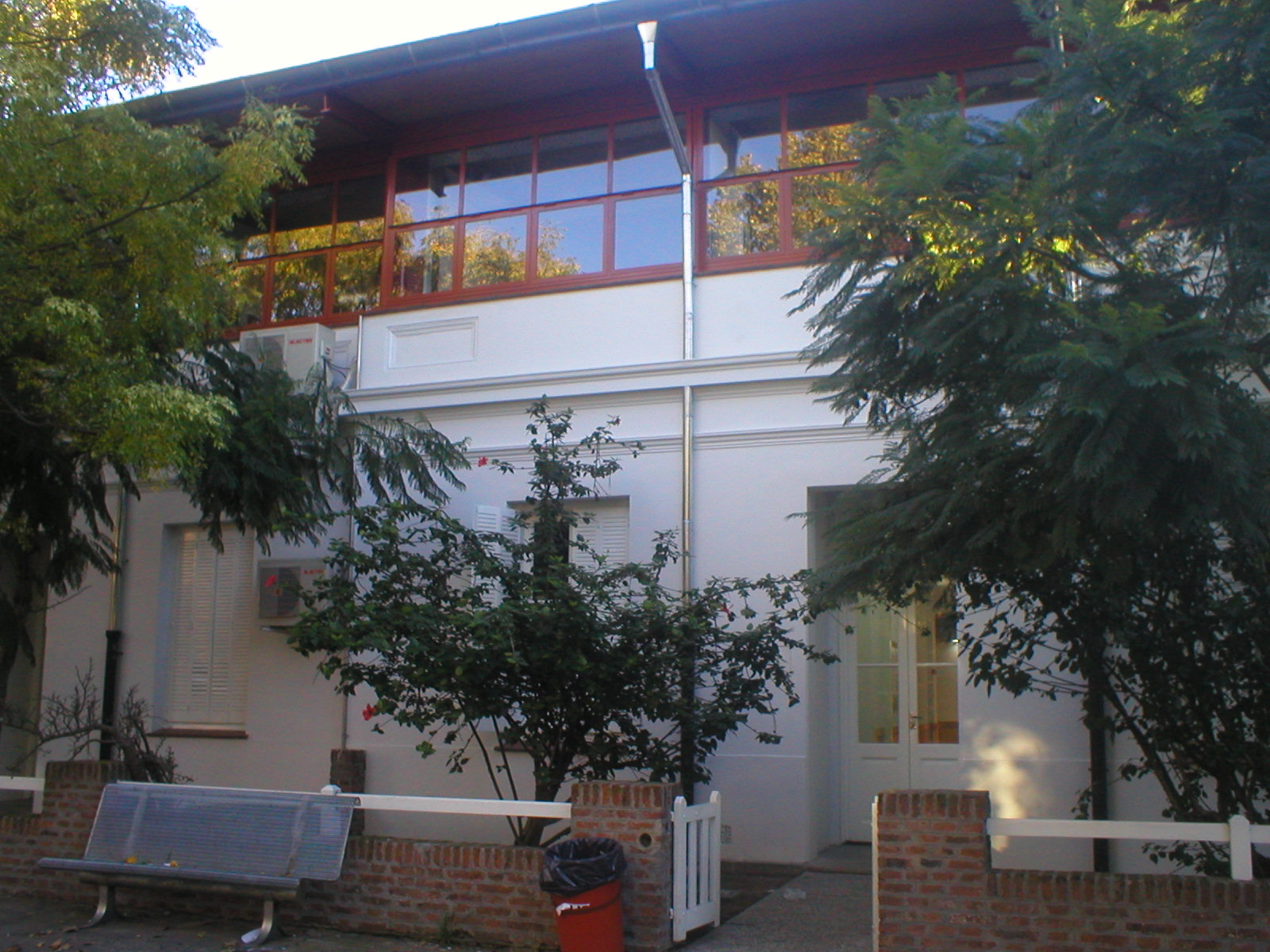
Department of Social Sciences

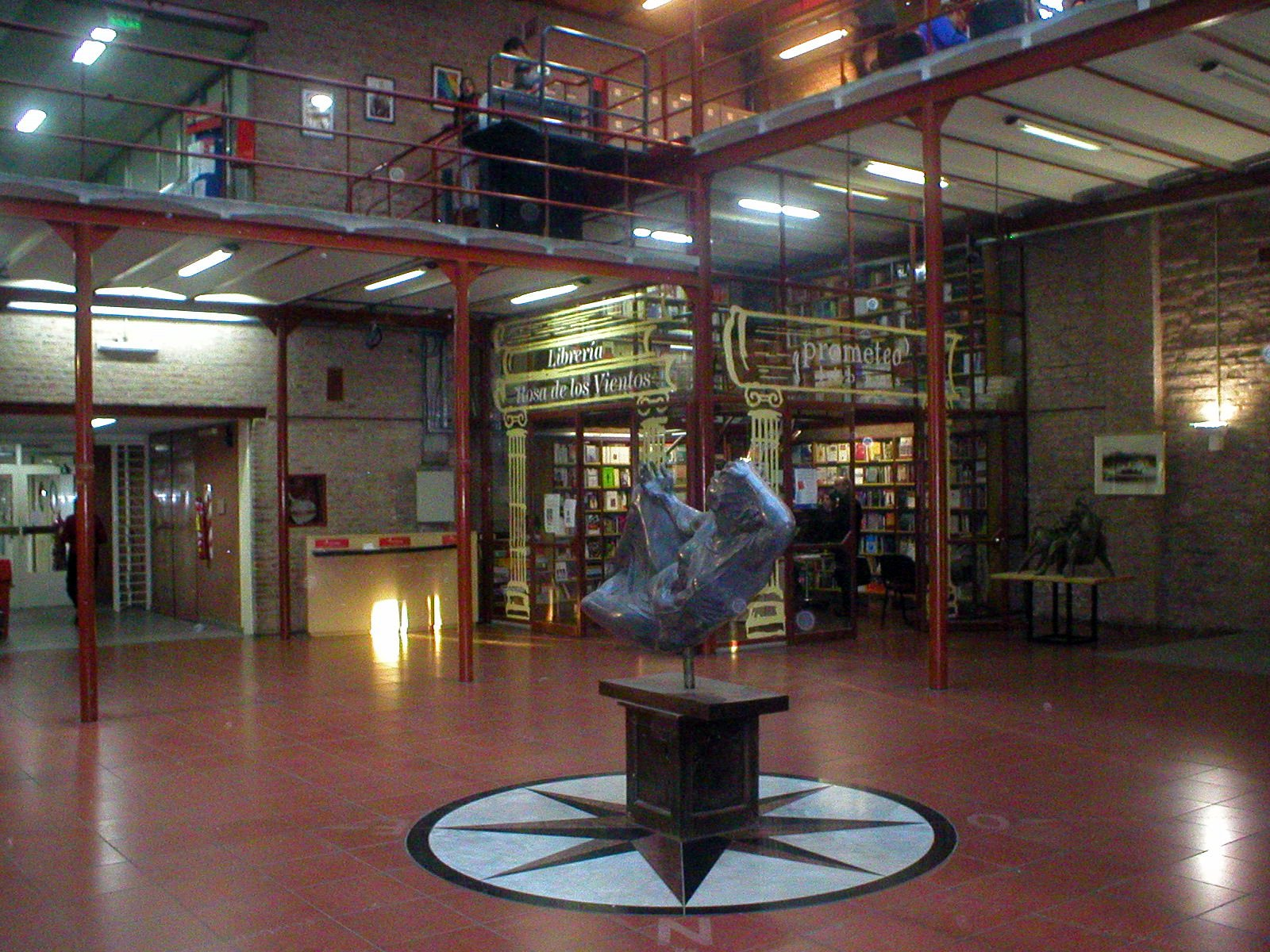
Student center

== See also ==
- List of Argentine universities
