= List of Argentines =

Flag of Argentina

Argentines who are notable include:

== Artists ==
- Roberto Aizenberg, painter and sculptor
- Oscar Alemán, jazz guitarist
- Antonio Alice, portrait painter
- Marcelo Álvarez, tenor
- Fermín Arango, painter
- Martha Argerich, concert pianist
- Daniel Barenboim, pianist and conductor
- Ricardo Basta, jewelry designer
- Adolfo Bellocq, lithographer
- Antonio Berni, painter
- Norma Bessouet, painter
- Miguel Ángel Biazzi, painter and sculptor
- Erminio Blotta, sculptor
- Julio Bocca, ballet dancer
- Gino Boccasile, advertiser
- Fabiana Bravo, soprano
- Alberto Breccia, cartoonist
- Emilio Caraffa, painter
- Ricardo Carpani, muralist
- Carybé, Argentine-Brazilian painter
- Eleonora Cassano, dancer
- Juan Carlos Castagnino, painter
- Eduardo Catalano, architect and sculptor
- Alejandro Christophersen, painter and architect
- Ciruelo, cartoonist
- Leonor Cecotto, painter, engraver
- Gustavo Cochet, painter
- Pío Collivadino, painter
- Oscar Conti (Oski), cartoonist
- Copi, cartoonist
- Milagros Correch (born 1991), painter, muralist
- Alicia Creus, visual artist
- Delia Cugat, painter, multimedia artist
- José Cura, tenor
- Pablo Curatella Manes, sculptor
- Ernesto de la Cárcova, painter
- Jorge de la Vega, painter
- Cesáreo Bernaldo de Quirós, painter
- Ángel María de Rosa, sculptor
- Helmut Ditsch, painter
- Jorge Donn, dancer
- Julio Ducuron, painter
- Elizabeth Eichhorn, sculptor
- María Gabriela Epumer, pop rock vocalist and guitarist
- Fernando Fader, painter
- León Ferrari, constructivist sculptor
- Leonor Fini, painter
- Bernarda Fink, mezzo-soprano
- Ingrid Fliter, pianist
- Lucio Fontana, sculptor
- Roberto Fontanarrosa, satirist and cartoonist
- Norma Fontenla, ballerina
- Raquel Forner, painter
- Sol Gabetta, cellist
- Manuel García Ferré, cartoonist
- Nicolás García Uriburu, painter and ecologist
- Gabriel Garrido, musician
- José Walter Gavito, sculptor
- Guillermo Gianninazzi, sculptor
- Patricio Fontanet, singer
- Andrés Francisco Giles, painter
- Reinaldo Giudici, painter
- Paloma Herrera, ballet dancer
- Isabel Iacona, painter
- Martín Irigoyen, composer and musician
- Ana Kamien, dancer, choreographer, and actor
- María Cristina Kiehr, soprano
- Gyula Kosice, sculptor
- Sebastian Krys, music producer
- Horacio Lavandera, concert pianist
- Julio Le Parc, sculptor
- Lydia Kindermann, opera singer
- Saul Lisazo, actor
- Cándido López, painter
- Alberto Lysy, concert violinist
- Rómulo Macció, painter
- Eduardo Mac Entyre, painter
- Maitena, cartoonist
- Tomás Maldonado, painter
- Martín Malharro, painter
- Marcel Martí, sculptor
- Lucien-Achille Mauzan, advertiser, sculptor
- Ad Minoliti, painter
- Dominic Miller, guitarist
- Marta Minujín, conceptual artist
- Florencio Molina Campos, illustrator
- Lola Mora, sculptor
- Guillermo Mordillo, cartoonist
- José Neglia, ballerino
- Luis Felipe Noé, painter
- Marianela Núñez, dancer
- Miguel Ocampo, painter and diplomat
- Marie Orensanz, conceptual artist
- Ludmila Pagliero, ballet dancer
- Raquel Partnoy, painter
- Lucy Patané, multi-instrumentalist musician, composer and producer
- Jorge Pepe, plastic artist and painter
- Celis Pérez, painter and muralist
- Emilio Pettoruti, painter
- Anselmo Piccoli, painter
- Marcelo Pombo, visual artist
- Eolo Pons, painter
- Alberto Portugheis, concert pianist
- Elisa Pritzker, contemporary artist
- Prilidiano Pueyrredón, painter
- Antonio Pujía, sculptor
- Quino, cartoonist
- Benito Quinquela Martín, painter
- Luciana Ravizzi, ballerina
- Carlos P. Ripamonte, painter
- Silvia Roederer, pianist
- Guillermo Roux, painter
- Hermenegildo Sábat, cartoonist
- Alberto Saichann, illustrator
- Eduardo Schiaffino, painter
- Antonio Seguí, painter
- Ronald Shakespear, graphic designer
- María Isabel Siewers, classical guitarist
- Ramón Silva, painter
- María Simón, sculptor
- Ricaro Liniers Siri, cartoonist
- Eduardo Sívori, painter
- Xul Solar, watercolorist, sculptor, inventor of languages
- Benjamín Solari Parravicini, painter and psychic
- Raúl Soldi, painter
- Lino Enea Spilimbergo, painter
- Sebastian Spreng, painter and stage designer
- Juan Carlos Stekelman, painter
- Ricardo Supisiche, painter
- Silvia Torras, painter
- Carlos Trillo, cartoonist
- Luigi Trinchero, sculptor
- Terig Tucci, violinist and composer
- Eduardo Vázquez, drummer
- Rogelio Yrurtia, sculptor

== Business ==
- Jorge Antonio, industrialist
- Otto Bemberg, industrialist
- Jorge Brito, banker
- Carlos Bulgheroni, industrialist
- Eduardo Costantini, businessman
- Francisco de Narváez, businessman
- Torcuato di Tella, industrialist
- Eduardo Elsztain, businessman
- Pedro Ferré, industrialist and governor
- Alfredo Fortabat, industrialist
- Marcos Galperin, internet entrepreneur
- Daniel Hadad, businessman
- Miguel Kiguel, economic and financial expert
- Patrick Lynch, businessman and ancestor of Che Guevara
- Francisco Macri, industrialist
- Mauricio Macri, businessman and president of Argentina
- Eduardo Madero, businessman
- Carlos Miguens Bemberg, businessman
- Nicolás Mihanovich, businessman
- Enrique Mosconi, petroleum industry promoter
- Patricio Peralta Ramos, developer
- Gregorio Pérez Companc, businessman
- Agostino Rocca, industrialist
- Paolo Rocca, industrialist
- Santiago Soldati, businessman
- Enrique Susini, businessman
- Ernesto Tornquist, businessman
- Martín Varsavsky, businessman
- Leandro Viotto, entrepreneur
- Jaime Yankelevich, businessman and television pioneer

== Composers ==
- Ernesto Acher
- Amancio Jacinto Alcorta
- Eduardo Alonso-Crespo
- Eduardo Arolas
- Luis Bacalov
- Agustín Bardi
- Esteban Benzecry
- José Antonio Bottiroli
- Enrique Cadícamo
- Jorge Calandrelli
- Francisco Canaro
- Juan José Castro
- Mario Davidovsky
- Julio de Caro
- Carlos di Sarli
- Homero Expósito
- Gabino Ezeiza
- Eduardo Falú
- Juan de Dios Filiberto
- Roberto Firpo
- Gilardo Gilardi
- Alberto Ginastera
- Osvaldo Golijov
- Carlos Guastavino
- Martín Irigoyen
- Rubén Juárez
- Mauricio Kagel
- Emilio Kauderer
- Carlos López Buchardo
- Enrique Maciel
- Homero Manzi
- Héctor Marcó
- Rodolfo Mederos
- Silvina Milstein
- Juana Molina
- Mariano Mores
- Sixto Palavecino
- Astor Piazzolla
- Ariel Ramírez
- Waldo de los Ríos
- Gustavo Santaolalla
- Vicente Scaramuzza
- Lalo Schifrin
- Oscar Strasnoy
- Alicia Terzian
- Alejandro Viñao
- Ezequiel Viñao
- Alberto Williams

== Entertainment ==
=== A-K ===
- Miguel Abuelo, musician
- Alejandro Agresti, filmmaker
- Antonio Agri, violinist
- Pablo Alarcón, actor
- Charly Alberti, drummer and activist
- Jorge Facundo Arana, actor and musician
- Tito Alberti, jazz drummer
- Alfredo Alcón, actor
- Norma Aleandro, actress
- Oscar Alemán, guitarist
- Pola Alonso, actress
- Héctor Alterio, actor
- Malena Alterio, actress
- Luis César Amadori, film director
- Blanquita Amaro, actress
- Sandro de América, singer and actor
- Mike Amigorena, actor and musician
- Elvia Andreoli, actress
- Héctor Anglada, actor
- Graciela Araujo, actress
- Carolina Ardohain, model
- Imperio Argentina, actress and flamenco dancer
- Helena Arizmendi, opera singer
- Ana Arneodo, actress
- Brenda Asnicar, actress and singer
- Federico Aubele, musician
- Fernando Ayala, filmmaker
- Pedro Aznar, jazz bass guitarist
- Héctor Babenco, filmmaker
- Christian Bach, actress
- Carlos Balá, children's television host
- Monchi Balestra, radio personality and television host
- Amelita Baltar, tango singer
- Gato Barbieri, saxophonist
- Dora Baret, actress
- Daniel Barone, filmmaker
- Sara Barrié, actress
- Stephanie Beatriz, actress
- Berenice Bejo, actress
- María Luisa Bemberg, filmmaker
- Amelia Bence, actress
- Lorena Bernal, model and actress
- Choly Berreteaga, TV chef
- Lola Berthet, actress
- Florencia Bertotti, actress, producer and singer
- Héctor Bidonde, actor and politician
- Fabián Bielinsky, filmmaker
- Mauricio "Moris" Birabent, rock composer and musician
- Thelma Biral, actress
- Betiana Blum, actress
- Camila Bordonaba, actress, singer and musician
- Tato Bores, humorist
- Graciela Borges, actress
- Patricio Borghetti, actor
- Aída Bortnik, screenwriter
- Zeta Bosio, bassist
- Juan Diego Botto, actor
- Elena Bozán
- Haydée Bozán, actress
- Sofía Bozán, actress
- Olinda Bozán, actress
- Luis Brandoni, actor and politician
- Fabiana Bravo, soprano
- Norman Briski, actor and theatre director
- Argentina Brunetti, actress and writer
- Alicia Bruzzo, actress
- Rodrigo, cuarteto singer
- Chris de Burgh, singer
- Daniel Burman, film director
- Facundo Cabral, singer
- Israel Adrián Caetano, Uruguayan-Argentine filmmaker
- Andrés Calamaro, songwriter and rock keyboard player
- Claudio Caldini, filmmaker
- Liliana Caldini, actress, model, and television host
- Miguel Caló, bandoneónist
- Juan José Campanella, filmmaker
- Marciano Cantero, singer
- Norma Gladys Cappagli, Miss World 1960
- Diego Capusotto, comedian
- Moria Casán, dancer and actress
- Ana Casares, actress
- Alfredo Casero, TV entertainer
- Ana Celentano, actress
- Gustavo Cerati, singer and guitarist of Soda Stereo
- Segundo Cernadas, actor
- María Concepción César, vedette
- Julio Chávez, actor
- Paula Chaves, model and actress
- Chenoa, singer
- Agustina Cherri, actress and dancer
- Graciana Chironi, actress
- David Chocarro, actor and model
- Jesica Cirio, dancer and model
- Gustavo Collini-Sartor, butoh dancer
- Felipe Colombo, actor, songwriter and musician Mexican-Argentine
- Pascual Contursi, lyricist
- Juan Carlos Copes, tango dancer and choreographer
- Irma Córdoba, actress
- Ada Cornaro, actress
- Ignacio Corsini, singer
- Antonella Costa, actress
- María Teresa Costantini, actress
- Edgardo Cozarinsky, filmmaker
- Linda Cristal, actress
- Quirino Cristiani, cartoonist and film director
- Lito Cruz, actor and theatre director
- Antonio Cunill Cabanellas, theatre director
- Ben Cura, actor and director of film, television and theatre.
- Patricia Dal, actress
- Elsa Daniel, actress
- Marcelo D'Andrea, actor
- Juan d'Arienzo, tango composer and bandleader
- Ricardo Darín, actor
- Pamela David, model
- Sandro de América, singer
- Eva De Dominici, actress and model
- Florencia De La V, transsexual actress
- Andrea del Boca, actress
- Hugo del Carril, tango vocalist
- Alberto de Mendoza, actor
- Iván de Pineda, model and talk show host
- Julieta Díaz, actress
- Yamila Diaz-Rahi, model
- Raúl di Blasio, pianist
- Alejandro Dolina, writer, commentator and critic
- Juanjo Domínguez, folk guitarist
- Martin Donovan, filmmaker
- Alejandro Doria, filmmaker
- Dorismar, model, show host
- María Clara D'Ubaldo, singer
- Ulises Dumont, actor
- Nancy Dupláa, actress
- Paulette Duval, actress
- Pablo Echarri, actor
- Roberto Escalada, actor
- Lali Espósito, actress and singer
- Laura Natalia Esquivel, actress and singer
- Ada Falcón, actress
- Juan Falú, guitarist
- Soledad Fandiño, actress and model
- Leonardo Favio, actor, singer and filmmaker
- José A. Ferreyra, filmmaker
- Golde Flami, actress
- Gabriela Flores, actress
- Vera Fogwill, actress
- Dolores Fonzi, actress
- Guillermo Francella, actor and comic
- Hugo Fregonese, film director
- Mariano Frogioni, clarinettist
- Mario Gallo, pioneering filmmaker
- Verónica Gamba, model
- Carlos Gandolfo, stage actor and director
- Myrtha Garbarini (1926–2015), opera singer
- Delia Garcés, actress
- Charly García, musician
- Ana García Blaya, film director
- Antonio Gasalla, comedian
- León Gieco, singer and musician
- Susana Giménez, actress, show host
- Araceli González, model and actress
- Julie Gonzalo, actress
- Roberto Goyeneche, tango vocalist
- Darío Grandinetti, actor
- Gustavo Guillén, actor
- Jorge Guinzburg, humorist and journalist
- Rodrigo Guirao Díaz, actor and musician
- Pablo Helman, visual effects supervisor
- Antonia Herrero, actress
- Olivia Hussey, actress
- Adrián Iaies, jazz pianist
- Narciso Ibáñez Menta, actor and filmmaker
- Rocío Igarzabal, actress
- Imperio Argentina, actress and singer
- Carlos Inzillo, jazz clarinetist and producer
- Martín Irigoyen, composer, musician
- Carlos Jiménez, singer
- Kevin Johansen, singer and musician
- Juan José Jusid, filmmaker
- Guido Kaczka, actor, producer and television show host
- David Kavlin, actor, singer, radio and television host
- Martín Karadagian, professional wrestler
- Sergio Kleiner, actor
- León Klimovsky, filmmaker

=== L-Z ===
- La Argentina, flamenco dancer
- La Argentinita, flamenco dancer
- Lydia Lamaison, actress
- Libertad Lamarque, singer and actress
- Fernando Lamas, actor
- Mercedes Lambre, actress and singer
- Romina Lanaro, model
- Kurt Land, screenwriter and director
- Víctor Laplace, actor
- Noemi Lapzeon, ballet dancer, choreographer
- María Cristina Laurenz, actress
- René Lavand, magician
- Raúl Lavié, tango vocalist
- Ricardo Lavié, actor
- Libertad Leblanc, actress
- Inda Ledesma, actress and theatre director
- Mirtha Legrand, actress and show host
- Silvia Legrand, actress
- Ana Lenchantin, cellist
- Paz Lenchantin, bassist-violinist
- Alejandro Lerner, songwriter and pianist
- Saúl Lisazo, actor
- Nélida Lobato, vedette
- Marga López, actress
- Carlos López Puccio, musician
- Darío Lopilato, actor
- Luisana Lopilato, actress and model
- Florencia Lozano, actress
- Silvina Luna, model and actress
- Federico Luppi, actor
- Virginia Luque, actress
- Tito Lusiardo, actor
- Mía Maestro, actress
- Ángel Magaña, actor
- Arturo Maly, actor
- Mona Maris, actress
- Jorge Maronna, musician
- Jorge Marrale, actor
- José Marrone, children's television host
- Niní Marshall, comedian
- Lucrecia Martel, theater and film director
- Duilio Marzio, actor
- Gerardo Masana, musician
- Mirta Teresita Massa, Miss International 1967
- Valeria Mazza, model and businesswoman
- Claribel Medina, actress, Puerto Rican by birth, Argentine citizen
- Esteban Mellino, comedian
- Tita Merello, singer and actress
- Juan Carlos Mesa, humorist and screenwriter
- Nito Mestre, singer and rock musician
- Eduardo Mignogna, filmmaker
- Alberto Migré, writer and director
- Amanda Miguel, singer
- Sandra Mihanovich, musician
- Juan Minujín, actor
- Osvaldo Miranda, actor
- Marianela Mirra, model and actress
- Luis Moglia Barth, filmmaker
- Juana Molina, actress and musician
- Inés Molina, actress
- Nuri Montsé, actress
- Mercedes Morán, actress
- Marcela Morelo, singer
- Cris Morena, actress, writer and television producer
- Zully Moreno, actress
- Bertha Moss, actress
- Marcos Mundstock, musician
- Berta Muñiz, actress
- Andres Muschietti, filmmaker
- Barbara Muschietti, producer
- Leonardo Nam, actor
- Norma Nolan, Miss Universe 1962
- Barry Norton, actor
- Carlos Núñez Cortés, musician
- Carlos Olguin-Trelawny, film director, screenwriter
- Héctor Olivera, filmmaker
- Alberto Olmedo, comedian
- Palito Ortega, singer
- Mecha Ortiz, actress
- Fito Páez, songwriter and rock keyboard player
- Pappo (Norberto Napolitano), rock musician
- Florencio Parravicini, actor
- Malvina Pastorino, actress
- Soledad Pastorutti, folk and pop singer
- Gastón Pauls, actor
- Luciana Pedraza, actress and filmmaker
- Carolina Peleritti, actress and model
- César Pelli, architect
- Diego Peretti, actor
- Mario Pergolini, variety show host
- Carla Peterson, actress
- Melina Petriella, actress
- Roberto Pettinato, TV entertainer
- Guillermo Pfening, actor and film director
- Ana María Picchio, actress
- Malena Pichot, comedian and actress
- Cecilia Pillado, actress, classical pianist, Argentine by birth
- Marcelo Piñeyro, filmmaker
- Gabriela Pochinki, opera and popular music singer
- Jorge Polaco, filmmaker
- Lola Ponce, singer, actress and model
- Jorge Porcel, comedian
- Naomi Preizler, model and artist
- Jorge Preloran, filmmaker and a pioneer in ethnobiographic film making
- Luca Prodan, Italian-born rock composer and leader of Argentine band Sumo
- Luis Puenzo, filmmaker
- Osvaldo Pugliese, tango composer
- Eugène Py, pioneering cinematographer
- Carla Quevedo, actress and designer
- Lorenzo Quinteros, actor
- Rodolfo Ranni, actor, Italian-born
- Daniel Rabinovich, musician
- Sergio Renán, director of film and theatre
- Alejandro Rey, actor
- Susana Rinaldi, singer
- Calu Rivero, actress
- Edmundo Rivero, tango singer
- Inés Rivero, model
- Nélida Roca, vedette
- Belén Rodríguez, model and actress
- Elena Roger, actress
- Benjamín Rojas, actor, singer and musician
- Alita Román, actress
- Manuel Romero, filmmaker
- Cecilia Roth, actress
- Ariel Rotter, filmmaker
- Ingrid Rubio, actress
- Sebastián Rulli, actor
- Mario Sábato, filmmaker
- Sabrina Sabrok, model and TV entertainer
- Horacio Salgán, pianist
- Dino Saluzzi, jazz bandoneonist
- Miguel Sánchez, comedian, actor, show host
- Gustavo Santaolalla, composer and musician, Academy Award winner in 2006 and 2007
- Julio Saraceni, filmmaker
- Isabel Sarli, actress
- Lidia Elsa Satragno, news anchor, talk show hostess and politician
- Josefina Scaglione, actress and singer
- María Martha Serra Lima, singer
- Soledad Silveyra, actress
- Fernando Siro, actor and director
- Mario Soffici, actor
- Alejandro Sokol, bassist and drummer
- Miguel Ángel Solá, actor
- Fernando Solanas, filmmaker and politician
- Juan Soler, actor
- Julia Solomonoff, actress
- Pepe Soriano, actor
- Carlos Sorín, filmmaker
- Coti Sorokin, songwriter, musician, composer
- Mercedes Sosa, folk singer
- Hugo Soto, actor
- Chango Spasiuk, folk musician and singer
- Luis Alberto Spinetta, rock musician and composer
- Bruno Stagnaro, filmmaker
- Lita Stantic, filmmaker
- Martina Stoessel, actress and singer
- René Strickler, actor
- Adrián Suar, actor and producer
- María Eugenia Suárez, actress
- Silvana Suárez, Miss World 1978
- Eliséo Subiela, filmmaker
- Damián Szifrón, filmmaker
- Anya Taylor-Joy, actress
- María del Luján Telpuk, model
- Juan Carlos Thorry, actor and tango musician
- Marcelo Tinelli, TV entertainer
- Carlos Thompson, actor
- Leopoldo Torre Nilsson, filmmaker
- Diego Torres, actor, singer and musician
- Leopoldo Torres Ríos, filmmaker
- Yésica Toscanini, model
- Pablo Trapero, filmmaker
- Aníbal Troilo, tango bandoneonist and songwriter
- Paulina Trotz, model
- Daniela Urzi, model
- Héctor Varela, tango musician
- Micaela Vázquez, actress
- Virginia Vera, singer and guitarist
- Natalia Verbeke, actress
- Diego Verdaguer, actor
- Candela Vetrano, actress
- Chunchuna Villafañe, actress
- Soledad Villamil, actress
- Lito Vitale, musician
- Tomás Wicz, actor and musician
- Alejandro Wiebe, television host
- Axel Witteveen, musician
- Atahualpa Yupanqui, folk songwriter and musician
- Sofía Zámolo, model
- Pablo Ziegler, Grammy award-winning pianist, composer and arranger
- Olga Zubarry, actress

== Fashion ==
- Alan Faena, fashion designer and developer
- Paco Jamandreu, haute couturier, confidant of First Lady Eva Perón

== Journalism ==
- Carlos Manuel Acuña, journalist
- Horacio Badaraco, journalist and anarchist
- Osvaldo Bayer, journalist and filmmaker
- Luis Bruschtein, journalist and newspaper deputy editor
- José Luis Cabezas, photojournalist
- Andrés Cantor (born 1962), Emmy Award-winning soccer sportscaster
- Jowi Campobassi (born 1983), television presenter and journalist
- Ángel de Brito (born 1976), entertainment journalist and television presenter
- Alicia Dujovne Ortiz, journalist and biographer
- Daniel Frescó, radio and television anchor
- Andrew Graham-Yooll, news editor and writer
- Enrique Gratas, television news reporter
- Mariano Grondona, television anchorman
- Hugo Guerrero Marthineitz, Peruvian-Argentine radio host and commentator
- Leonardo Henrichsen, photojournalist
- David Kraiselburd, newspaper publisher
- Jorge Lanata, journalist and writer
- José Mármol, journalist and writer
- Karen Maron, war correspondent
- Tomás Eloy Martínez, journalist, writer and newspaper founder
- Fray Mocho (José Sixto Álvarez), journalist and writer
- Eduardo Montes-Bradley, journalist, writer, filmmaker
- Joaquín Morales Solá, journalist, commentator and anchor
- Conrado Nalé Roxlo, journalist and writer
- Roberto Noble, journalist, politician and publisher
- Andrés Oppenheimer, television anchorman
- Horacio Pagani, sportswriter and announcer
- José María Pasquini Durán, journalist and writer
- Roberto Payró, journalist and publisher
- Pedro Sevcec, television anchorman
- Rossana Cecilia Surballe, lawyer, journalist, and diplomat
- Rodolfo Terragno, journalist and politician
- Jacobo Timerman, journalist and writer
- Bernardo Verbitsky, journalist and writer
- Horacio Verbitsky, journalist, activist and writer
- Constancio C. Vigil, journalist, writer and publisher
- Fabian Waintal, journalist

== Public service ==
=== Military ===
- Ignacio Álvarez Thomas, early military leader
- Pedro Aramburu, dictator, 1955–58
- Manuel Belgrano, politician, creator of the Argentine flag in 1812
- Guillermo Brown, distinguished admiral
- Carlos María de Alvear, early military leader
- Hippolyte de Bouchard, privateer and early captain of the Argentine Navy
- Federico de Brandsen, early military leader
- Omar Carrasco, a conscript whose murder led to the abolition of conscription in Argentina
- Martín Miguel de Güemes, early military leader
- Juan Gregorio de las Heras, early military leader
- Juan Martín de Pueyrredón, early military leader
- José de San Martín, general, liberator of Argentina, Chile and Perú from the Spanish Colony
- Eustaquio Díaz Vélez, early military leader
- Leopoldo Galtieri, dictator, 1981–82
- Antonio González de Balcarce, early military leader
- Juan Lavalle, early military leader
- Juan Carlos Onganía, dictator, 1966–70
- María Isabel Pansa (born 1961), first woman Army general
- José María Paz, early military leader
- Martín Rodríguez, early military leader
- Saturnino José Rodríguez Peña, early military leader
- José Rondeau, early military leader
- Manuel Savio, steel industry promoter
- Samuel Spiro, navy captain
- Jorge Videla, dictator, 1976–81
- Juan Domingo Perón, military general, president,

=== Politics ===
- Josep Borrell Fontelles, Spanish politician serving as High Representative of the Union for Foreign Affairs and Security Policy and former Minister of Foreign Affairs, European Union and Cooperation in the Government of Spain. He acquired Argentine citizenship in 2019.
- Pablo Rodriguez, politician
- Rafael Grossi, politician
- Juan Bautista Alberdi, constitutional scholar
- Leandro Alem, founder of the centrist Radical Civic Union
- Oscar Alende, reformist governor
- Raúl Alfonsín, president, 1983–1989
- Ricardo Alfonsín, politician
- Álvaro Alsogaray, conservative economist
- José Arce, diplomat
- Ricardo Balbín, prominent leader of the "Unión Cívica Radical" party
- José Ber Gelbard, Peronist economic adviser
- Hermes Binner, Socialist governor of Santa Fe Province, the first so elected
- Ángel Borlenghi, labor leader
- Leopoldo Bravo, politician and diplomat
- Teodoro Bronzini, former Socialist mayor of Mar del Plata, first to head a major Argentine city
- Dante Caputo, diplomat
- Elisa Carrió, politician
- Domingo Cavallo, economist
- Jorge Cepernic, governor
- Julio Cobos, Vice President of Argentina
- Marcelo Torcuato de Alvear, president, 1922–1928
- Hebe de Bonafini, head of the Mothers of the Plaza de Mayo
- Alicia Moreau de Justo, wife of Juan B. Justo and prominent socialist leader
- Fernando de la Rúa, president, 1999–2001
- Francisco de Narváez, politician
- Juan Manuel de Rosas, strongman, 1829–1952
- Justo José de Urquiza, first president of the modern era
- Guido di Tella, diplomat
- Luis María Drago, diplomat
- Eduardo Duhalde, president, 2002–2003
- Raúl Estrada-Oyuela, diplomat
- Aldo Ferrer, economist
- Rogelio Frigerio, economist
- Arturo Frondizi, president, 1958–1962
- Rubén Giustiniani, politician
- Ernesto "Che" Guevara, Marxist revolutionary
- Daiana Hissa, Minister
- Arturo Illía, president, 1963–66
- Juan B. Justo, founder of the Argentine Socialist Party
- Cristina Kirchner, president, 2007–2015
- Néstor Kirchner, president, 2003–2007
- Roberto Lavagna, economist
- Miguel Braun, economist
- Estanislao López, early pro-autonomy leader
- José López Rega, fascist adviser to President Perón
- José Alfredo Martínez de Hoz, conservative economist
- Francisco Manrique, politician, creator of current national medical and housing funds
- Carlos Menem, president, 1989–1999
- Lorenzo Miguel, labor leader
- Bartolomé Mitre, president, 1862–1868
- Mariano Moreno, independence-era leader and reformer
- Enrique Mosconi, promoter of national oil industry
- Hugo Moyano, labor leader
- Raimundo Ongaro, labor leader
- Alfredo Palacios, socialist leader
- Eva Perón, influential first lady
- Isabel Perón, first lady and president, 1974–1976
- Juan Perón, president, 1946–55, 1973–74
- Juan Pistarini, public works minister and vicepresident
- Raúl Prebisch, economist
- Facundo Quiroga, early pro-autonomy leader
- Bernardino Rivadavia, president
- Julio Roca, president, 1880–1886, 1898–1904
- Dardo Rocha, reformist governor and founder of La Plata
- José Ignacio Rucci, labor leader
- Carlos Saavedra Lamas, diplomat
- Amadeo Sabattini, reformist governor
- Roque Sáenz Peña, president and promulgator of the secret ballot in Argentina
- Domingo Sarmiento, writer, educator and president (1868–1874)
- Daniel Scioli, former speedboater, later vice president and governor
- Oscar Soria, international political activist
- Jorge Enea Spilimbergo, poet, Marxist theorist and politician
- Margarita Stolbizer, politician
- Saúl Ubaldini, labor leader
- Dalmacio Vélez Sársfield, author of civil and commercial codes
- Hipólito Yrigoyen, president 1916–1922, 1928–1930

== Religion ==
- Enrique Angelelli, assassinated Bishop of La Rioja
- Sergio Bergman, rabbi, politician, pharmacist, writer and social activist
- Jose Gabriel del Rosario Brochero, Roman Catholic priest canonized as a Saint on 16 October 2016
- Mamerto Esquiú, friar and activist
- Pope Francis (Jorge Mario Bergoglio), head of the Catholic Church from 2013 to 2025
- José Gabriel Funes, Jesuit priest and director of the Vatican Observatory
- Gauchito Gil, 19th-century healer
- Claudio Lepratti, assassinated priest and anti-poverty activist
- Carlos Mugica, assassinated priest and anti-poverty activist
- Ceferino Namuncurá, saintly religious student, beatified in 2007
- Pedro Opeka, priest, missionary and humanitarian
- Luis Palau, prominent Protestant-evangelical preacher
- Mario Pantaleo, priest, healer and humanitarian
- Mario Rodríguez Cobos, spiritual leader, writer and activist
- Abraham Skorka, rabbi and biophysicist

== Royalty ==
- Princess Catharina-Amalia of the Netherlands, half Argentine
- Princess Alexia of the Netherlands, half Argentine
- Princess Ariane of the Netherlands, half Argentine
- Queen Máxima of the Netherlands (Máxima Zorreguieta), Argentine

== Sciences ==
- Luis Agote, M.D., devised first safe blood transfusion
- Juan Bautista Ambrosetti, anthropologist and naturalist
- Florentino Ameghino, naturalist
- Cosme Argerich, doctor
- José Antonio Balseiro, nuclear physicist
- Lino Barañao, biochemist and current Minister of Science
- Dan Jacobo Beninson, nuclear physicist
- Cecilia Berdichevsky, computer scientist
- Jorge Bobone, astronomer
- José Bonaparte, paleontologist
- Eduardo Braun-Menéndez, physiologist
- Mario Bunge, physicist
- Hermann Burmeister, naturalist
- Luis Caffarelli, mathematician
- Alberto Calderón, mathematician
- Ramón Carrillo, neurosurgeon and first Minister of Health
- Carlos Ulrrico Cesco, astronomer
- Rodolfo Coria, paleontologist
- Miguel Rolando Covian, physiologist
- Roberto Dabbene, ornithologist
- Adolfo J. de Bold, PhD, scientist, considered the father of cardiovascular endocrinology,
- Salvador Debenedetti, archaeologist
- René Favaloro, surgeon, inventor of the coronary bypass surgery
- Hilario Fernández Long, structural engineer and educator
- Enrique Finochietto, surgeon and inventor of numerous surgical tools
- Susana Freydoz, nutritionist and former First Lady of Río Negro Province
- Richard Gans, physicist
- Mario Garavaglia, physicist
- Ramón Enrique Gaviola, astrophysicist
- Ana María Gayoso, marine biologist
- Mario Giovinetto, geographer
- Juan Hartmann, astronomer
- Eduardo Ladislao Holmberg, geologist and zoologist
- Bernardo Houssay, Nobel Laureate in Medicine and Physiology
- Luis Huergo, engineer
- Eva Verbitsky Hunt, anthropologist
- Armando Theodoro Hunziker, botanist
- Miguel Itzigsohn, astronomer
- Hugo Krawczyk, cryptographer
- Carlos Lanusse, scientist and professor of Pharmacology
- Jakob Laub, physicist
- Luis Federico Leloir, Nobel Laureate in Chemistry
- Domingo Liotta, M.D., cardiologist, and inventor of the first purely artificial heart
- José María Mainetti, oncologist
- Julio Isidro Maiztegui, epidemiologist
- Juan Martín Maldacena, physicist
- Salvador Mazza, epidemiologist
- César Milstein, Nobel Laureate in Medicine and Pharmacology
- Francisco Moreno, explorer
- Julio Navarro, astrophysicist
- Virpi Niemelä, astronomer
- Fernando Novas, paleontologist
- Guillermo O'Donnell, politic scientist
- Miguel Ondetti, pharmaceutical scientist
- Yolanda Ortiz (chemist), chemist, environmentalist
- Evelia Edith Oyhenart, biological anthropologist
- Raúl Pateras Pescara, helicopter pioneer
- Livio Dante Porta, mechanical engineer
- Marta Graciela Rovira, solar physicist
- Jorge Sabato, physicist
- Julio José Gustavo Sardagna, neurologist and neurosurgeon
- Tito Scaiano, laser chemist
- Carlos Segers, astronomer
- Manuel Sadosky, computer scientist
- Luis Santaló, mathematician
- Friedrich Schickendantz, naturalist
- Carlos Varsavsky, astrophysicist
- Miguel Angel Virasoro, physicist
- Juan Vucetich, inventor of the modern technique of fingerprinting.
- Abraham Willink, entomologist
- Roberto Zaldívar, ophthalmologist
- Nadia Zyncenko, meteorologist

== Writers ==
- César Aira
- Juan Argerich
- Roberto Arlt
- Hilario Ascasubi
- Enrique Banchs
- Héctor Bianciotti
- Adolfo Bioy Casares
- Isidoro Blaisten
- Jorge Luis Borges
- Elsa Bornemann
- José Antonio Bottiroli
- Silvina Bullrich
- Susana Calandrelli
- Eugenio Cambaceres
- Miguel Cané
- Martín Caparrós
- Evaristo Carriego
- Leonardo Castellani
- Abelardo Castillo
- Haroldo Conti
- Gabino Coria Peñaloza
- Julio Cortázar
- Roberto Cossa
- Agustín Cuzzani
- Estanislao del Campo
- Emma de Cartosio
- Marco Denevi
- Antonio di Benedetto
- Beatriz Doumerc
- Osvaldo Dragún
- Esteban Echeverría
- Samuel Eichelbaum
- Fogwill
- Jorge Fondebrider
- Luis Franco
- Rodrigo Fresán
- Silvio Frondizi
- Griselda Gambaro
- Juan Gelman
- Alberto Gerchunoff
- Oliverio Girondo
- Angélica Gorodischer
- Carlos Gorostiza
- Juana Manuela Gorriti
- Paul Groussac
- Eduardo Gudiño Kieffer
- Beatriz Guido
- Ricardo Güiraldes
- Eduardo Gutiérrez
- Tulio Halperín Donghi
- José Hernández
- Guillermo Enrique Hudson
- Enrique Anderson Imbert
- José Ingenieros
- Isol
- Roberto Juarroz
- Alicia Jurado
- Joseph Kessel
- Igor Sergei Klinki
- Alejandro Korn
- María Hortensia Lacau
- Osvaldo Lamborghini
- Alfredo Le Pera
- Belén López Peiró
- Vicente López y Planes
- Leopoldo Lugones
- Félix Luna
- Benito Lynch
- Eduardo Mallea
- Leopoldo Marechal
- Ezequiel Martínez Estrada
- Guillermo Martínez
- Tomás Eloy Martínez
- Carlos Mastronardi
- José Nicolás Matienzo
- Leonardo Moledo
- Ricardo Molinari
- Eduardo Montes-Bradley
- Manuel Mujica Láinez
- Rafael Obligado
- Silvina Ocampo
- Victoria Ocampo
- Pacho O'Donnell
- Héctor Germán Oesterheld
- Olga Orozco
- Juan L. Ortiz
- Calixto Oyuela
- Pedro Bonifacio Palacios
- Alicia Partnoy
- Josefina Passadori
- Ivo Pelay
- Ricardo Piglia
- Felipe Pigna
- Alejandra Pizarnik
- Antonio Porchia
- Juan Carlos Portantiero
- Manuel Puig
- Andrés Rivera
- Arturo Andrés Roig
- Ricardo Rojas
- Ernesto Sabato
- Juan José Saer
- Beatriz Sarlo
- Domingo Faustino Sarmiento
- Osvaldo Soriano
- Rafael Squirru
- Alfonsina Storni
- Mario Trejo
- Alberto Vaccarezza
- Luisa Valenzuela
- Florencio Varela
- David Viñas
- María Elena Walsh
- Rodolfo Walsh
- Juan Rodolfo Wilcock

== Other ==
- Daniel Adler, lawyer
- Amancio Alcorta, diplomat and scholar
- Marcella Althaus-Reid, theologian
- Mario Roberto Álvarez, architect
- María Angélica Barreda, first woman lawyer in Argentina
- Pedro Benoit, urbanist and architect
- Mabel Bianco (born 1941), physician and women's rights activist
- László Bíró, inventor of the ballpoint pen
- Gloria Bonder, psychologist
- Eliana Bórmida, architect
- Olga Fernández Latour de Botas, folklorist, writer and educator
- Eduardo Bradley, aerostat pilot
- Juan Antonio Buschiazzo, architect
- Alejandro Bustillo, architect
- Raquel Camaña, teacher and activist
- Susana Chiarotti, lawyer and women's rights activist
- Luis Chocobar, former police officer and political activist
- Julio Dormal, architect
- Rosa Dubovsky, feminist, anarchist
- Gato Dumas, chef and restaurateur
- Carlos Escudé, political scientist
- María Amalia Lacroze de Fortabat, executive
- Iván Germán Velázquez, former police officer living in Uruguay
- Francisco Gianotti, architect
- Julio Godio, historian
- Carlos Bernardo González Pecotche, pedagogian and philosopher
- Clotilde González de Fernández (1880–1935), educator, writer
- Mary Olstine Graham (1842–1902), educator
- Roberto Grau, chess player
- Soto Grimshaw, explorer and naturalist
- Daniel Grinbank, producer
- Ernesto Garzón Valdés, philosopher
- Paul Groussac, encyclopedist and librarian
- Juan María Gutiérrez, educator
- Carlos Heller, credit union leader
- Violet Jessop, dual Irish-Argentine woman and steamship stewardess
- Otto Krause, educator
- Juan Carlos Lectoure, boxing promoter
- Roberto Maidana, interviewer
- María Cristina Martínez Córdoba, lawyer
- Anibal Mistorni, luthier
- Juan Moreira, righteous outlaw
- José Luis Murature, diplomat and newspaper editor
- Miguel Najdorf, chess player
- Eduardo Newbery, aerostat pilot
- Jorge Newbery, aviation pioneer
- Ernestina Herrera de Noble, publisher
- Patricia Ocampo, activist involved in community development
- Alejandro Orfila, diplomat and winemaker
- Horacio Pagani, auto designer
- Mario Palanti, architect
- Oscar Panno, chess player
- José C. Paz, publisher
- César Pelli, architect
- Amanda Peralta (1939–2009), guerrilla fighter, later historian in Sweden's Gothenburg University
- Adolfo Perez Esquivel, human rights activist and Nobel prize winner
- Rogelio Pfirter, diplomat
- Patricio Pouchulu, architect
- Maria Verónica Reina, disability rights activist
- Carlos Saavedra Lamas, academian, politician, the first Latin American Nobel Peace Prize winner
- Francisco Salamone, architect
- Raúl Scalabrini Ortiz, political and social theorist
- Orlando Sconza, professor
- José María Sobral, Antarctic explorer
- Gerardo Sofovich, producer
- Vicente Solano Lima, publisher and politician
- Viktor Sulčič, architect
- Celia Tapias, first female lawyer in Buenos Aires
- Clorindo Testa, architect
- Carlos Thays, renowned landscape architecture
- Margarita Trlin, architect
- Azucena Villaflor de Vicenti, murdered activist
- Fausto Vitello, skateboarder and publisher
- Amancio Williams, architect
- Carina González, researcher focused on artificial intelligence and e-learning.

== See also ==
- List of people by nationality
- List of German Argentines
- List of Argentine Americans
- List of Argentine Jews
- List of Argentine women artists
- List of Italian Argentines
- List of Asian Argentines
- List of Hungarian Argentines
