= Sardagna =

Sardagna is an Italian surname. Notable people with the surname include:

- Gianfranco Sardagna (born 1935), Italian basketball player
- Julio José Gustavo Sardagna (1932–2009), Argentine neurologist and neurosurgeon
