= Luciana Ravizzi =

Argentine retired ballerina (born 1982)

- Born: Maria Luciana Ravizzi; 28 January 1982 (age 43); Buenos Aires, Argentina
- Education: Instituto Superior de Arte del Teatro Colón (1994-1999) The Royal Ballet School (1999-2002)
- Occupation: Ballet Dancer (2001-2015) Ballet Teacher (2015-present) Pilates Instructor (2022-present)
- Spouse: Ross Kennedy (m. 2014)
- Children: 1
- Website: www.lucianaravizzi.com

Luciana Ravizzi (born 1982) is an Argentine retired ballerina who graduated from The Royal Ballet School and was a Soloist with Scottish Ballet until her retirement in 2015.

== Early life ==
Luciana Ravizzi was born in 1982 in Buenos Aires, Argentina. She began dancing at the age of five and was accepted into the Instituto Superior de Arte del Teatro Colón in 1994 at the age of 12. In 1999, she auditioned for The Royal Ballet School, in London, where she gained acceptance and a scholarship to attend the Upper School. She graduated in 2002.

== Dancing career ==
While studying at The Royal Ballet School, Ravizzi was invited to perform with The Royal Ballet in several productions including "Giselle", "Swan Lake" & "Don Quixote", including an International tour on Australia in 2001.

Ravizzi joined the Scottish Ballet in 2002 under the directorship of Ashley Page, where she spent her entire professional career. She was promoted to coryphée in 2008, and soloist in 2014. During her time with Scottish Ballet she performed in the following ballets, including numerous international tours:

- The Nutcracker (Snowflake, Courgette Flower), Page
- Cinderella (Godmother, Winter), Page
- Fearful Symmetries, Page
- The Sleeping Beauty (The Lilac Fairy, Snow White), Page
- Pennies From Heaven, Page
- Cheating, Lying, Stealing, Page
- Alice (Duchess, Cheshire Cat), Page
- Dangerous Liaisons, Alston
- The Four Temperaments, Balanchine
- Apollo, Balanchine
- Episodes, Balanchine
- Rubies, Balanchine
- Agon, Balanchine
- Five Rückert Songs, Darrell
- Othello (Emilia), Darrell
- Artifact Suite, Forsythe
- Workwithinwork, Forsythe
- Petrushka, Spink
- Ride the Beast, Petronio
- Façade, Ashton
- Scènes de Ballet, Ashton
- Romeo & Juliet (Juliet), Pastor
- In Light and Shadow, Pastor
- Carmen (Mercedes), Alston
- Still Life, Caniparoli
- Song of the Earth, MacMillan
- Chasing Ghost, Loosmore
- Five Tangos, Van Manen
- Kings 2 Ends, Jorma Elo
- A Streetcar Named Desire (Blanche), Meckler/Lopez Ochoa
- Run For It, Lawrence
- Dark Full Ride, Lawrence
- Highland Fling, Bourne
- Oxymore, Laplane
- Elite Syncopations, MacMillan
- Cheri, Darrell
- Silhouette, Hampson
- The Rite of Spring, Hampson
- Hansel & Gretel, Hampson
- The Crucible, Pickett
- Ten Poems, Bruce

Ravizzi retired from dancing in 2015.

== Teaching career ==
Following her successful career as a ballerina, Ravizzi returned to Buenos Aires in 2017 to begin teaching the next generation of Argentine dancers. She founded Luciana Ravizzi - Maestra de Danza and has since become a prominent teacher in Buenos Aires.

In 2019, she moved to USA with her family where she continues to teach Ballet. In 2022, she became a fully trained Pilates Instructor.
