= Collini =

Collini is an Italian surname. Notable people with the surname include:

- Cosimo Alessandro Collini (1727–1806), Italian historian
- Stefan Collini (born 1947), English literary critic and academic

== See also ==
- Gustavo Collini-Sartor, Argentine dancer
- Collino
