= Miguel Ocampo =

Argentine painter and diplomat (1922–2015)

- Born: Miguel Saturnino Ocampo Leloir; November 29, 1922; Buenos Aires, Argentina
- Died: November 24, 2015; La Cumbre, Argentina
- Education: University of Buenos Aires
- Occupation(s): Painter, sculptor, architect, diplomat, writer
- Movement: Madí, Nueva Figuración, Artistas Modernos de la Argentina, Modernism

Miguel Saturnino Ocampo Leloir (1922—2015), was an Argentine painter, sculptor, writer, architect, and diplomat. He is known for his contributions to Latin American modernism; and he was a figure within the Madí art movement, the Artistas Modernos de la Argentina art movement, and the Nueva Figuración art movement. He lived in Buenos Aires in his early life, and in La Cumbre from 1978 until his death in 2015.

== Biography ==
Miguel Ocampo was born on November 29, 1922, in Buenos Aires, Argentina. He studied architecture (class of 1947) at the University of Buenos Aires.

In 1948 after graduation Ocampo traveled to Europe, where he met Georges Braque and André Lhote. Ocampo's first art exhibition in Paris was in 1950. Ocampo entered the diplomatic corps in 1955; and was posted to Rome (1956 to 1959), followed by Paris (1961 to 1966), and New York City (1969 to 1978).

His paintings are monochromatic nature, and known for minimalism and geometric abstraction. In 1948 he joined the Madí artistic movement. Notable artworks by Ocampo include ‘The Stage of the Labyrinth’ (1954), ‘Painting’ (1965), and ‘Movement of Space’ (1963).

His work is in museum collections, including the Museum of Modern Art, the Buffalo AKG Art Museum, and the National Gallery of Art.

== See also ==
- List of Argentines
