= Collino =

Collino is an Italian surname. Notable people with the surname include:

- Alberto Collino (1947–2020), Italian mathematician
- Ignazio Collino (1724–1793), Italian sculptor
- Maria Consolata Collino (born 1947), Italian fencer

== See also ==
- Collini
