= Ashley Page =

British former ballet dancer

Ashley Page OBE (born August 1956) is a British former ballet dancer, choreographer and was artistic director of Scottish Ballet for ten years.

Ashley Page was born in Rochester, Kent in August 1956.

Page trained the Royal Ballet School, and joined the Royal Ballet in 1976. There, he worked closely with Frederick Ashton and Kenneth MacMillan, creating numerous roles in their new ballets. He also worked with visiting choreographers including Glen Tetley and, especially, Richard Alston, who was to become his choreographic mentor. He was promoted to principal dancer in 1984.

Page was artistic director of Scottish Ballet for ten years, from 2002 to 2012. In August 2012, Christopher Hampson succeeded him as artistic director of Scottish Ballet.

He was appointed Officer of the Order of the British Empire (OBE) in the 2006 Birthday Honours for services to dance.
