= María Cristina Martínez Córdoba =

Argentine lawyer

María Cristina Martínez Córdoba is an Argentine lawyer. She represents the General Defendant of the Nation in the jury against José María Campagnoli, the prosecutor that investigated The Route of the K-Money.
