= Juan Carlos Stekelman =

Argentine painter and print maker

Juan Carlos Stekelman (born March 29, 1936, in Buenos Aires, Argentina, died December 2015 in Buenos Aires) was a leading Argentine painter and print maker.

He started his artistic studies at the Buenos Aires University of Engineering, before transferring to the Manuel Belgrano School of Arts and graduating in 1962. In the mid-1960s he travelled to the US, where he continued his artistic education and was invited to hold an individual exhibition at the Panamerican Union in Washington.

Throughout the 1960s he contributed illustrations to satirical magazines such as Tia Vicente.

In 1968 Stekelman married and moved to England. He continued to paint and held exhibitions in London, Oxford, Leicester, Brighton, and other British cities.

In 1989 he moved back to his homeland and settled in Buenos Aires. Stekelman worked in gouache and acrylics, but mainly specialised in lino and wood prints, using simple, bold images in black and white.

In his later years Stekelman gained wider international recognition, and in 2002 he won an award in the Segunda Bienal Argentina de Gráfica Latinoamericana. He is also known for his graphic design work, having designed posters for the Argentine dance troupe Tangokinesis, among others. In 2015 he won first prize in the printmaking section of the annual Manuel Belgrano Fine Arts Salon.

His artwork can be found in the permanent collections of the following museums:

- The Museum of Modern Art in Buenos Aires, Argentina
- The Museum of Modern Art in New York
- The Museum of Modern Art in Córdoba, Argentina
- The Museum of Modern Art in Santa Fe, Argentina
- The Museum of Modern Art in Asunción, Paraguay
- The National Museum Print in Buenos Aires, Argentina
- The British Museum in London
