= Fabian Waintal =

Argentine-American journalist

Fabian W. Waintal (born January 5, 1964) is an Argentine journalist based in Hollywood, California. He has interviewed actors including Harrison Ford, Jennifer Aniston, George Clooney, Angelina Jolie, Leonardo DiCaprio and Cameron Diaz. He has covered the Academy Awards for more than 15 consecutive years, and has been an executive producer for the international Oscars TV transmission twice.

He has been the Los Angeles Correspondent for the magazine Vanidades since 1990, and his interviews are also published by the newspapers ABC (Spain), El Universal (Venezuela), El Vocero (Puerto Rico) and the Taipei Times (Taiwan). Born in Buenos Aires, Argentina, he started writing as journalist there when he was 16 years old. Before he was 18 the Argentine magazine Gente y la actualidad started publishing his entertainment column. Waintal moved from Buenos Aires to Los Angeles, California, on January 14, 1990, to work as the L.A. correspondent for Gente and Editorial Atlántida.

== Sources ==
- http://www.waintal.com
- https://www.imdb.com/name/nm5186460/
- https://www.vanidades.com/buscar.html?search=waintal
- https://www.infobae.com/autor/fabian-waintal/
- https://www.excelsior.com.mx/funcion/jane-fonda-esta-vigente-gracias-a-sus-nietos/1525805
- https://www.lanacion.com.ar/autor/fabian-w-waintal-13741/
- https://www.elespectador.com/entretenimiento/gente/el-interlocutor-de-las-estrellas/
- https://www.elheraldo.hn/entretenimiento/fabian-waintal-el-periodista-de-las-estrellas-KBEH599704
- https://lasemanadelsur.com/2021/12/07/fabian-waintan-el-periodista-de-las-estrellas-fabian-waintan-the-hispanic-journalist-of-the-stars/
