= Jorge Pepe =

Argentine plastic artist and painter

Jorge Pepe (1939–2006) was an Argentine plastic artist and painter. He was born in Buenos Aires, Argentina on September 29, 1939.

== Career ==
Jorge Pepe studied Fine Arts at the Manuel Belgrano, Prilidiano Pueyrredón and Ernesto Cárcova centers. In his nearly 40 year career, he produced plastic work focused primarily on expression through oil and drawing. His works can be seen in many lounges and private collections in Argentina and other European and American countries. He also founded and was active in "Grupo del Bajo", "Grupo Tendencias" and "Grupo 95". The important social and educational work that Jorge Pepe has practiced in his hometown, Villa Ballester and San Martin should also be noted.

== Cultural coordination ==
1988

Coordinated Murals at No. 39 School, San Martín.

1989

Coordinator of the Centenario de Villa Ballester.
Coordinator of the I Bienal de Pintura en Villa Ballester.

1990

Coordinator of the La Calle Sports Complex, in Villa Ballester.
Coordinator of the I Bienal de Dibujo y Grabado de Villa Ballester
Coordinator of the Municipality of General San Martín' in the E.S.M.I.C.

1991

Coordinator of the II Bienal de Pintura en Villa Ballester
Coordinator of a team of San Martín muralists.

1996

Curator of the I Mega muestra 200 art. Plásticos Argentinos in the former mint in the Federal Capital.

1997

Curator of the I Muestra en la Biblioteca “Roberto Clemente” of J. L. Suárez (San Martín) Buenos Aires.

1998

Curator of Muestras in E.G.D. (Democratic Management Team).

1999

Presented Conferences in AEOL Lacanian School of Psychoanalysis on: Works with children from disadvantaged neighborhoods with drawing and painting workshops, visits to various museums, creation of a library.

2000

Management and Cultural Policy Conferences organized per direction of attendants, Promotions and cultural outreach of the Province of Buenos Aires and management of the culture of the municipality of Tres de Febrero - Buenos Aires.

2001

Curator of the Muestra CXI Aniversario de Villa Ballester organized by the “El Pueblo de la Tradición” Foundation.
Curator of Exhibitions at the “El Pueblo de la Tradición” Foundation, San Martín, Buenos Aires Province - For which, following the custom of the Cultural Department of General San Martin he made more than 70 murals in the Party.
Judge at National, Provincial and Municipal Meetings.
Integrated Argentine Painters CD for Mercosur of the OAS.

== Individual exhibitions ==
- 1974: Coopigra Gallery – Capital Federal.
- 1974: Chaco Provincial Home – Capital Federal.
- 1976: Lirolay Gallery – Federal Capital.
- 1977: B.C. Mar Gallery – Adrogué.
- 1980: Lirolay Gallery – Federal Capital.
- 1982: "El Conquistador Hotel" Gallery – Federal Capital.
- 1986: T.V. Channel 13 Programme Badía y Cia.
- 1988: Banco Caseros Foundation Gallery – Federal Capital.
- 1988: "El Cubil" Gallery – Palomar, Buenos Aires.
- 1989: En Escenografías de las Obras "Gris de Ausencia" and "El Oso", in the General San Martín Municipality.
- 1990: Banco Caseros Foundation Gallery – Caseros.
- 1991: 60th Anniversary of the Youth Bane - Municipal Palace, General San Martín.
- 1991: Gemellaggio – Business Meeting in Italy - City Council of General San Martin.
- 1992: “Paddle Delirium” – San Martín.
- 1993: Credicoop Bank – San Martín.
- 1995: Ernesto Sabato Cultural Centre – Santos Lugares.
- 1997: Ignacio Gallery – Santos Lugares.
- 1998: E.G.D. (Equipo de Gestión Democrática) Gallery – San Martín.
- 1998: "Roberto Clemente" Library – J. L. Suárez.
- 1998: Exhibition in the San Martin Music Hall.
- 2000: E.G.D. Gallery – San Martín.
- 2000: Argentina National Congress - Tribute to Piazzolla.
- 2001: Municipal Building Caseros – Tres de Febrero – Buenos Aires.
- 2001: "El Pueblo de la Tradición" Foundation – San Martín.
- 2002: Exhibition in the San Martin Music Hall.
- 2002: Exhibition in the Pestalozzi Cultural Association.
- 2002: Municipality of Tres de Febrero – Paintings.
- 2002: National Technological University – Federal Capital Headquarters - Paintings.
- 2002: Bar Association of San Martín - Drawings.

== Group exhibitions ==
- 1971: Dr. Guillermo Rawson School – Federal Capital.
- 1972: Piñeyro Cooperative – Avellaneda.
- 1972: Coopigra Gallery – Federal Capital.
- 1973: Teatro Embassy –Federal Capital.
- 1975: Ateneo popular de la Boca.
- 1979: S.E.A. “Grupo del Bajo” Gallery – Federal Capital
- 1979: Encouragement of Fine Arts.
- 1984: Un lugar para el Arte Gallery – Banfield.
- 1984: Provincial House of Buenos Aires - Capital Federal.
- 1986: German school – Palomar (Buenos Aires).
- 1987: Tres de Febrero Cultural Centre (Buenos Aires).
- 1988: Winners of the 1st place Salón Otoño, General San Martín Municipality.
- 1989: School No. 39 – Villa Maipú - San Martín.
- 1989: ESMIC 89´ -General San Martín (Buenos Aires).
- 1989: Banco Río –Centenary of de V. Ballester (Buenos Aires).
- 1989: “La Calle” Sports Complex, V. Ballester (Buenos Aires).
- 1990: Galicia Bank – Suc. V. Ballester (Buenos Aires).
- 1990: Savings Bank – San Martín (Buenos Aires).
- 1990: Savings Bank – Vicente López (Buenos Aires).
- 1990: "Grupo Tendencias" –University Centre – Villa Ballester- (Buenos Aires).
- 1990: Meeting of Teachers in Normal School No. 1, San Martin (Buenos Aires).
- 1991: Buenos Aires Plastic Art Meeting at " La Calle", Villa Ballester (Buenos Aires).
- 1991: House of Culture Tres de Febrero.
- 1991: CXV Anniversary of the Fine Arts Stimulus, Federal Capital.
- 1992: “ Grupo Tendencias”, University Centre of Villa Ballester (Buenos Aires).
- 1992: Tres de Febrero House of Culture (Buenos Aires).
- 1992: “ARBOS” – News room in Art, Federal Capital.
- 1993: Inauguration of the Cultural Complex of the Municipality of General San Martin (Buenos Aires).
- 1995: Paseo de las Artes, Bco. Caseros Foundation (Buenos Aires).
- 1996: Ernesto Sabato Cultural Centre – Santos Lugares.
- 1996: Faculty of Economic Sciences of the University of Buenos Aires.
- 1996: Group Exhibition in Rio de Janeiro, Brazil. Sponsored by the Argentine Consulate and Macenas magazine.
- 1996: B. Rivadavia Popular Library, Villa Ballester (Buenos Aires).
- 1996: Margot Touson Gallery, Federal Capital.
- 1996: 120th Aniversario of the Stat. Assoc. of Fine Arts, Federal Capital.
- 1996: Illustrated poems in the center of Villa Ballester University (Buenos Aires).
- 1996: Judges of the Biennials at the University Center, Villa Ballester.
- 1996: Art in “Hotel Arenas” –Pinamar.
- 1997: VI Biennal of La Habana – Subsede Municipality, October 10 - Cuba.
- 1997: EDEA Gallery in the former mint – Federal Capital.
- 1997: San Martín Artists in Brazil, sponsored by the Cultural Department of the Municipality of General San Martin.
- 1997: General San Martin Plastic Artists of in the University Center of Villa Ballester (Buenos Aires).
- 1997: "Roberto Clemente" Library –San Martín (Buenos Aires).
- 1997: Plastic Artists en ESMIC – San Martín.
- 1998: "Bernardino Rivadavia" Library, Villa Ballester (Buenos Aires).
- 1998: Colonial Art Gallery – Seminario “ Psicoanálisis y Arte” – Federal Capital.
- 1999: "Bernardino Rivadavia" Library, Villa Ballester (Buenos Aires).
- 1999: German Equestrian Club.
- 2000: Art in Alcorta – Federal Capital.
- 2000: "REVIENS" Hotel – Pinamar (Buenos Aires).
- 2001: Posta Carretas Hotel – Villa Gessel (Provincia Buenos Aires).
- 2001: Arts in Avellaneda Shopping.
- 2002: Municipality de Tres de Febrero with students from his workshop.
- 2002: Plastic Artists of General San Martin in the Bernardino Rivadavia Popular Library of Villa Ballester.
- 2002: Winners of the 1st Municipal Prize from Tres de Febrero – Short Format.
- 2002: Museum of Art – Santa Rosa – La Pampa.
- 2002: The culture of General Pico – La Pampa.
- 2002: "Todo Papel en el Arte" – Trash manufacturing – Federal Capital
- 2002: National Music Centre – "Concierto Arte 2002" – Sponsored by the Ministry of Culture – Federal Capital.
- 2002: Exhibition in Cuba "Homenaje a José Martí".
- 2002: Bellas Artes "Manuel Belgrano" School – Ex Students – Federal Capital

== Participated in the following Exhibitions ==
- 1972: Bolsa de Cereales.
- 1973: Alba.
- 1974: Fúlton.
- 1974: Otoño de San Fernando.
- 1975: Illustrated Poems – Ateneo pop La Boca.
- 1975: Municipality of Vicente López.
- 1976: Bolsa de Cereales.
- 1978: XIV National Print and Drawing Exhibition.
- 1981: Municipality of Tigre.
- 1982: Otoño de San Fernando.
- 1982: Vicente López Municipality.
- 1983: Tigre Municipal.
- 1983: Municipality of Gral. San Martín.
- 1984: San Fernando Otoño.
- 1984: 1st National Exhibition Homage to "José Hernández".
- 1985: Félix Amador by Vicente López.
- 1985: 1st Intermunicipal Exhibition of General San Martín.
- 1986: San Martín Municipal.
- 1987: Municipality of Tres de Febrero.
- 1988: Municipality of San Martín.
- 1988: 1st Argentina Club of Fine Arts Painting Exhibition Federal Capital.
- 1989: 50th Anniversary of Vicente López 1st Annual Plastic Art Exhibition.
- 1989: Small Scale Exhibition – SAPI.
- 1990: Small Scale Exhibition Municipality of Tres de Febrero.
- 1990: Otoño of Gral. San Martín Municipal.
- 1990: Intermunicipal Metropolitan Region Exhibition of the Province of Buenos Aires.
- 1990: Small Scale Exhibition – SAPI.
- 1990: XII "Fernán F. De Amador" Painting Exhibition, Luján.
- 1990: Municipal Museum of Luján Small Scale Exhibition.
- 1990: Otoño Municipality of San Martín.
- 1991: 50th Anniversary Exhibition Avellaneda People of Art.
- 1991: 1st Plastic Arts Workshops Personal Gallery Sup. of SEGBA and Oleo and Mármol – Federal Capital.
- 1991: Small Scale Exhibition – SAPI.
- 1992: Salón Otoño – General San Martín Municipal.
- 1992: Small Scale Exhibition – SAPI.
- 1992: National Spring Exhibition, Bernardino Rivadavia Library, - Villa Ballester.
- 1994: Great Trilogy Exhibition.
- 1994: Painting Exhibition of Villa Ballester, University Center.
- 1994: Small Scale Exhibition SAPI and the Municipality of Tres de Febrero.
- 1995: Salón Otoño – SAPI.
- 1996: Salón Otoño – SAPI.
- 1996: National Spring Exhibition. Bernardino Rivadavia Library.
- 1997: Salón Otoño –SAPI and Caseros Bank Foundation.
- 1998: Bienal Small Scale Exhibition in the "Roberto Clemente" Library – J. L. Suárez - San Martín.
- 1998: Art Encounter, Federal Capital.
- 1998: National Painting Exhibition –Municipality of Caseros.
- 1998: Bernardino Rivadavia Library National Spring Exhibition.
- 1998: Abstract Painting in Art Encounter.
- 1999: National Painting Exhibition - Caseros, Buenos Aires.
- 2000: National Painting Exhibition – Caseros, Buenos Aires.
- 2000: Bernardino Rivadavia National Library.
- 2001: SAPI and Municipality of Caseros National Exhibition - Small Scale.
- 2002: National Painting Exhibition – Municipality of Tres de Febrero.
- 2002: Exhibition Homage to José Martí – Federal District.

== Prizes and awards ==
- 1982: Special painting mention. Otoño San Fernando Exhibition.
- 1984: 1st Prize Drawing. José Hernández National Exhibition, San Martín.
- 1987: Diploma of Honor. Paseo de las Artes – Caseros.
- 1988: First Prize Municipal Exhibition General San Martín.
- 1988: Diploma de Honor. Paseo de las Artes. Caseros.
- 1991: Mention 50th Aniversario Gente de Arte de Avellaneda.
- 1991: Mention "La Palabra" Newspaper. San Martín.
- 1992: 3rd Prize. Painting. Municipal Exhibition, General San Martín.
- 1992: 1st Mention. Painting. National Spring Exhibition. Bernardino Rivadavia Library – Villa Ballester.
- 1992: 2nd Mention. Drawing. National Spring Exhibition. Bernardino Rivadavia Library – Villa Ballester.
- 1992: Honorable Mention. Small Scale Exhibition. SAPI.- Drawing.
- 1994: 3rd Prize. Drawing. National Spring Exhibition. Bernardino Rivadavia Library – Villa Ballester.
- 1994: 2nd Prize. Drawing. Small Scale Exhibition. SAPI.
- 1996: 2nd Prize. Painting. National Spring Exhibition. Bernardino Rivadavia Library – Villa Ballester.
- 1998: 1st Prize. Drawing. First Bienal Small Scale Exhibition. Roberto Clemente Library – J.L. Suarez – Buenos Aires.
- 1998: 2nd Prize. Drawing. National Spring Exhibition. Bernardino Rivadavia Library.
- 2000: 1st Mention. Drawing. National Spring Exhibition. Bernardino Rivadavia Library – Villa Ballester.
- 2001: 1st Prize. National Small Scale Exhibition. SAPI and Tres de Febrero Municipality. Drawing.
- 2002: Certificate of Honor – Museum of Plastic Art, General San Martín.
- 2002: 2nd Prize – Homage to José Martí Exhibition. Drawing.
