= Luis Bruschtein =

Argentine journalist

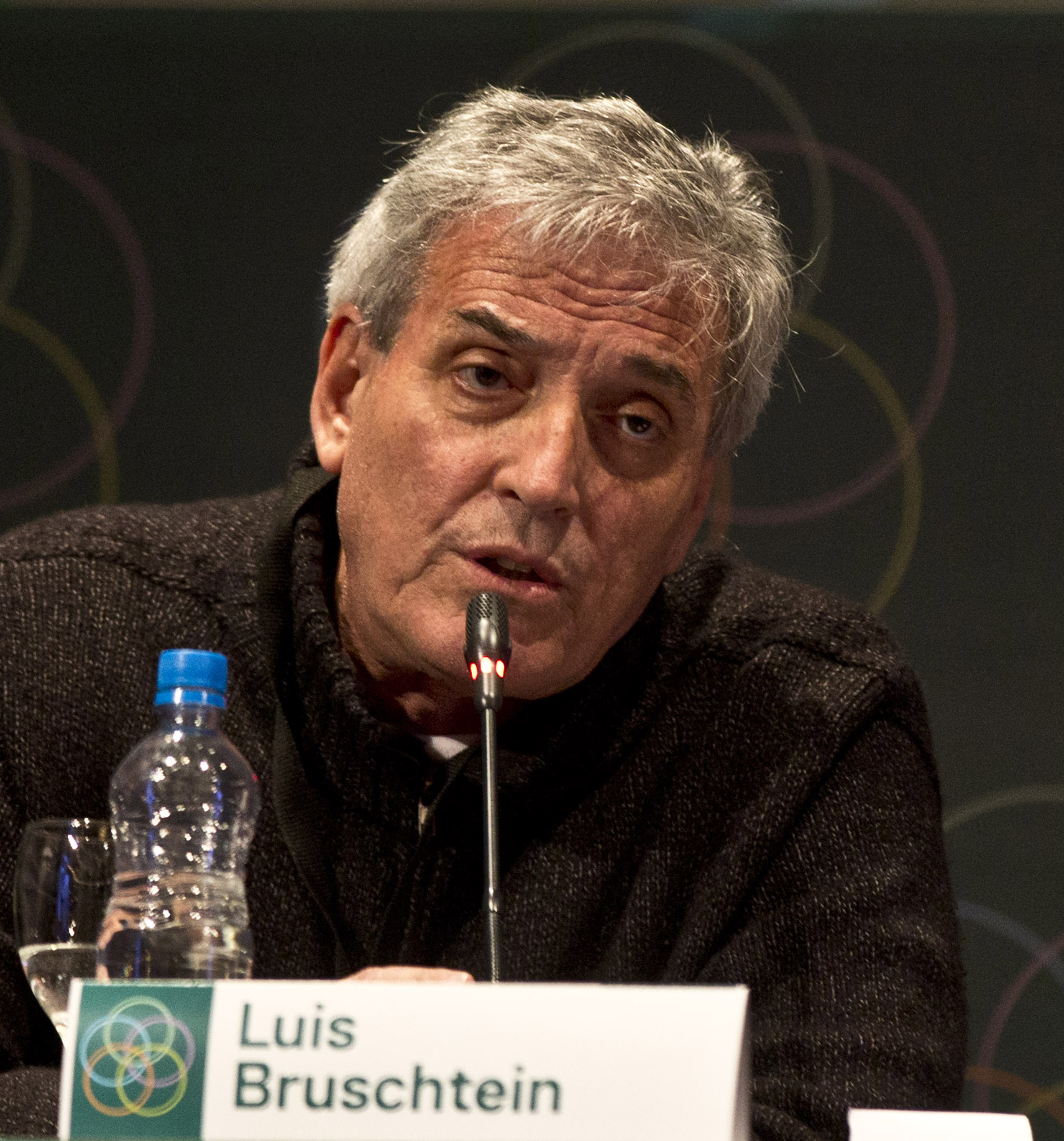
- Bruschtein in July 2015
- Born: July 26, 1954 (age 72); Argentina
- Occupation: Journalist
- Notable work: He is the son of Laura Bonaparte one of the founders of the Mothers of the Plaza de Mayo

Luis Marcelo Bruschtein (July 26, 1954) is an Argentine journalist, deputy editor of the newspaper Página 12, who lived in exile in Mexico, after forced disappearance of his family such as his three siblings and his father.

He is the son of Laura Bonaparte, one of the founders of organization called the Mothers of Plaza de Mayo.

== Biography ==
He is the son of biochemist Santiago Isaac Bruschtein and Laura Bonaparte, and brother of Aída Leonora "Noni" Bruschtein Bonaparte, Irene Mónica Bruschtein Bonaparte and Víctor Rafael Bruschtein Bonaparte.

His first job as a journalist was at age 17, when he was enrolled in the UBA. At the end of the conscription, when his age was 22 years, he entered to an association that promoted the demographic development in the south as a journalist. Later, he joined Gente for two years. He began work with scientific popularization and ended up doing everything but politics.

He began his militancy at the end of the sixties in the CGT of the Argentines. Then he started working with the Peronist Working Youth, where he was responsible for his newspaper in Montoneros. He also participated in the Peronist Press Bloc between 1973 and 1975. He worked with Prensa Latina. He began his exile in 1975 in Venezuela. Then, between 1976 and 1977, he went to Mexico, until 1978 and then moved to Panama, then returned to Mexico. In Panama, he participated in groups that supported the government of Omar Torrijos Herrera and the insurgency movements of Central America. In Mexico, he worked as a journalist in the ecology magazine Survival and in La Jornada. He participated in the founding of the Latin American Federation of Journalists and he was the editor in chief of the magazine Ciencia y Desarrollo, belonging to the National Council of Science and Technology. He was also joined the associations against the dictatorship in Argentina.

In 1984 he worked at La Razón de Jacobo Timerman, a Soviet-born Argentine publisher and journalist, first as editor of Science and Technology, and then as a copywriter. His professional life continued at Page/ 12, morning where he starts almost from the beginning. His tasks combines with collaborations in television and radio. In 2004 he took over the sub-direction. Before that he had published the cultural magazine Lezama, against the hegemonic discourse of neoliberalism with important signatures.
