= Abraham Willink =

Dutch-Argentine entomologist

- Born: 13 January 1920; Drachten, Friesland
- Died: 8 February 1988 (aged 68); Tucumán
- Scientific career
- Fields: entomology

Abraham Willink (13 January 1920, Drachten, Friesland – 8 February 1998, Tucumán) was a Dutch-Argentine entomologist. His main contributions were made on the Hymenopteran families Vespidae, Sphecidae and Crabronidae. He also contributed to the classification of biogeographical provinces of Latin America. His role was of great interest in the decentralization of science, especially in Entomology in Argentina.
3 Genera and 52 species has been named after him.

== Selected works ==
- Willink, A. 1969. Las especies del género Incodynerus Willink (Hym., Eumenidae). Acta Zool. Lilloana 24: 65-88.
- Cabrera, A.L. & A. Willink. 1980. Biogeografía de América Latina. Segunda edición. Monografía 13, serie biología. Programa Regional de Desarrollo Científico y Tecnológico, Organización de los Estados Americanos. 122 pp. + 1 map.
- Willink, A. 1982. Revisión de los generos Montezumia Saussure and Monobia Saussure (Hymenoptera: Eumenidae). Bol. Acad. Nac. Cienc., Cordoba 55: 3-321.
- Willink, A. and A. Roig-Alsina. 1998. Revisión del genero Pachodynerus Saussure (Hymenoptera: Vespidae, Eumeninae). Contrib. Am. Entomol. Inst. 30 (5): 1-117.
