= Christopher Hampson =

English ballet dancer and choreographer

Christopher Hampson CBE
- Born: 31 March 1973 (age 53); Middleton, Lancashire, England
- Occupations: choreographer, former ballet dancer
- Career
- Former groups: English National Ballet

Christopher Hampson CBE (born 31 March 1973) is an English ballet choreographer and director and former ballet dancer. In August 2012, Hampson succeeded Ashley Page as artistic director of Scottish Ballet, and was appointed CEO/Artistic Director in 2015.

He is a graduate of the Royal Ballet School, where he began his professional training at the age of 11. He danced professionally with the English National Ballet, reaching the rank of Soloist.

Hampson retired from dancing to pursue a career as a choreographer and director of ballets, and has since produced works for the Royal New Zealand Ballet, English National Ballet, Prague National Ballet and the Atlanta Ballet. He has also produced various works for vocational dance schools in the United Kingdom, including the Royal Ballet School, Elmhurst School for Dance and the London Studio Centre. He has also been a ballet master for the City Ballet of London.

He was named one of "25 to Watch" in 2003 by Dance Magazine.

Hampson was appointed Commander of the Order of the British Empire (CBE) in the 2023 Birthday Honours for services to dance.

== Awards ==
- Barclays Theatre Award for Outstanding Achievement in Dance
- Critics' Circle National Dance Awards for Best Classical Choreography
- Nominated for Best New Dance Production, Laurence Olivier Awards 2005
