= Gabriela Pochinki =

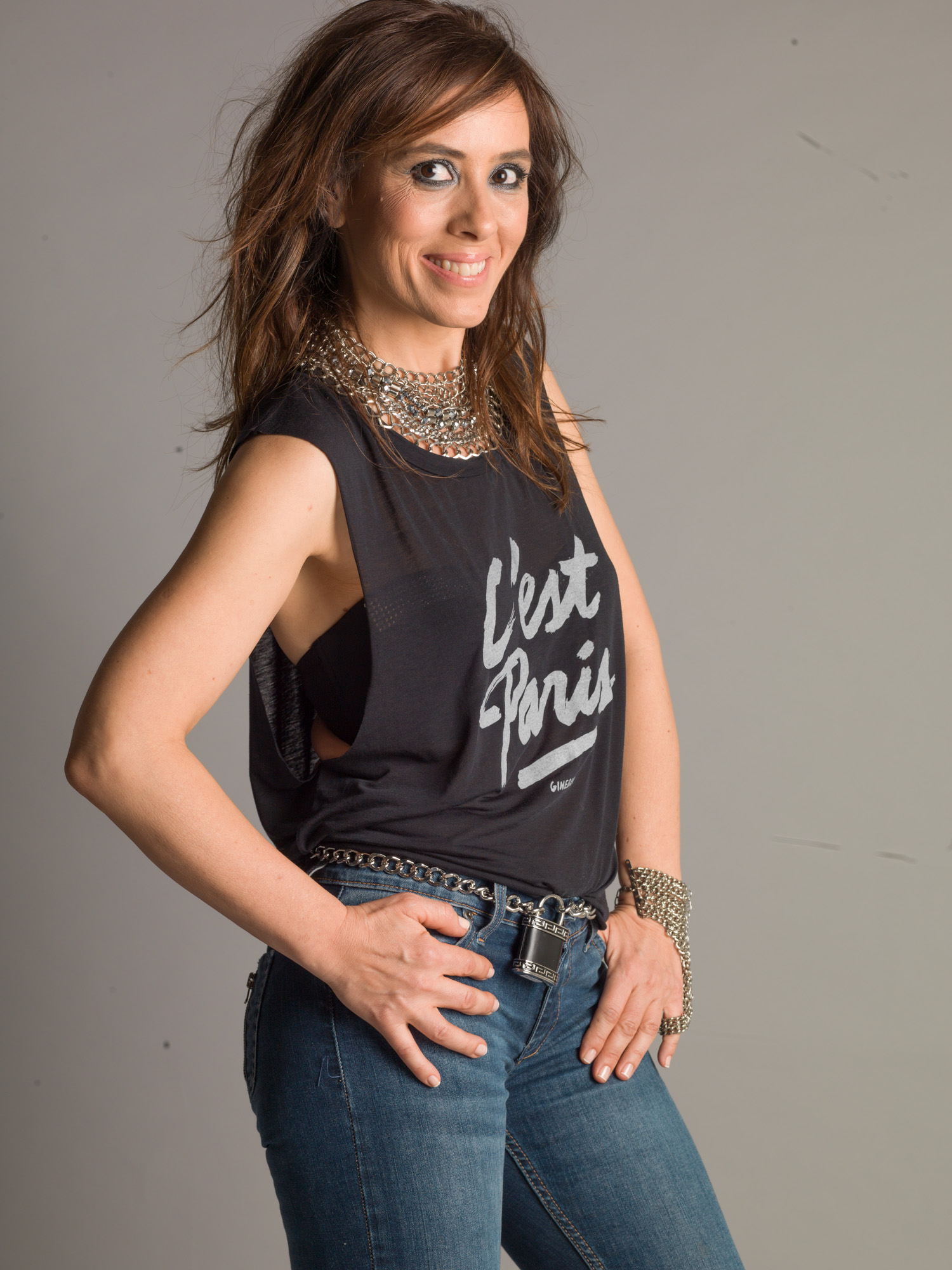
- Pochinki in 2014
- Born: Gabriela Edith Pochinki; Buenos Aires, Argentina
- Occupation: Singer
- Children: 1
- Awards: Full list
- Musical career
- Genres: Opera, pop, tango, popular music
- Instrument: Vocals (Soprano)
- Label: Sony Music
- Website: www.gabrielapochinki.com.ar

Signature
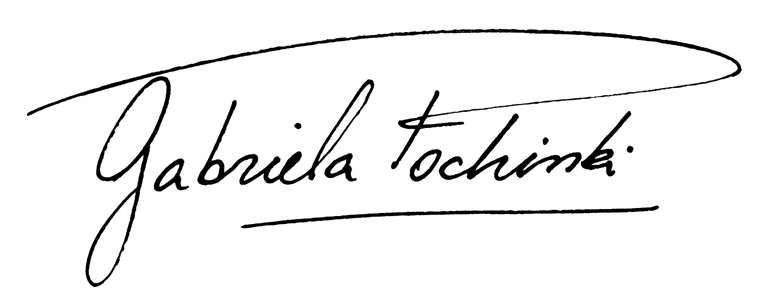

Gabriela Edith Pochinki is a singer of Opera and popular music. She was born in Buenos Aires, Argentina, and has begun her career when she was a child. She has been awarded prizes at major Opera competitions, including "Best Female Opera Singer" at the Sanremo Festival and "Best Singer In The World" at the 3º Festival della Lirica of the Sanremo Musica Festival, both in Italy. She got the second prize at the Pavarotti Competition, where she met Luciano Pavarotti, who stated at the time: "The quality of Gabriela’s voice is stunningly beautiful".

== Music career ==
She first received a bachelor's degree and then a master's degree in music from the Manhattan School of Music. She also received a degree in Speech Therapy from Universidad de Medicina de El Salvador in Buenos Aires. Apart from Opera, she recorded many songs in different styles and genres such as Tango, Pop Music and liturgical chants. Pochinki played different characters in many popular Operas, not only in Argentina but also in United States and Europe. For nine months she played the role of Maria in Leonard Bernstein's West Side Story at the Landestheater in Salzburg and at the Vienna's Volksoper. During her stay in the United States, she toured many cities with the Virginia Opera, where she was the only non-North American performer of the original English-language Broadway version of West Side Story.

Apart from playing a Maria in Bernstein's West Side Story, Gabriela also played Gilda in Verdi's Rigoletto, Rosina in Rossini's The Barber of Seville, and Marie in Donizetti's The Daughter of the Regiment. Besides, she performed famous songs like “Somewhere over the Rainbow" from The Wizard of Oz.

== Incursion in Pop Music ==
Gabriela Pochinki made an incursion in Pop Music with her debut album entitled Pájaro Rebelde.

After recording a wide repertoire of Opera arias and liturgical chants with the accompaniment of different symphonic orchestras, she traveled to Los Angeles on an invitation by Michael Jackson's father Joe Jackson, who helped her to start her career in Pop Music. She lived eight months in Neverland and had the opportunity to meet Michael Jackson. She became close to Jackson's family and in 2009 she was invited to perform live at This Is It movie premiere. Soon after she was invited back to Los Angeles by the seven-time Grammy winner producer Kenny O'Brien, who is known for his work with Celine Dion. With O'Brien, she spent a couple of months choosing and developing a wide repertoire of popular songs. Jorge Calandrelli worked on the arrangements and orchestration of the recordings. In 2007 Sony BMG released her Opera-Pop album sang entirely in Spanish, Pájaro Rebelde ("Rebel Bird"). The album includes acclaimed songs such as Horacio Guarany's “Amar amando” and “Memorias de una vieja canción”, and Carlos Gardel and Alfredo Le Pera's classic “El día que me quieras”. The album includes Tangos, love songs, and well-known arias like Mozart's “Queen of the Night” and Schubert's “Ave Maria”, which at the time had famously become Pope John Paul II's wake-up tune.

Since Pochinki has reached popular recognition by playing a wide repertoire that goes from Opera to popular music, she received by American and European press the sobriquet of “La Soprano del Pueblo” ("The People's Soprano").

== Awards ==
- “Best Female Opera Singer”, Sanremo Festival, Italy.
- "Best Singer In The World" at the 3º Festival della Lirica of the Sanremo Musica Festival
- Second Prize in the Pavarotti Competition, United States.

== Theater ==
- Landestheater of Luzern (Switzerland): she played Maria in the English-German version of West Side Story performed at the Landestheater of Salzburg, Austria, accompanied by the Mozarteum Orchestra at Vienna's Volksoper, Austria.
- Festspielhaus Baden-Baden, Germany.
- Virginia Opera: she played on the Broadway version of West Side Story and toured across a number of cities in the United States.
- She played Adele in the English version of Die Fledermaus (The Bat) performed at the Illinois Opera House in Chicago. She also played on a Hebrew version at The New Israel Opera in Tel Aviv, and a German version at the Vienna Opera house.
- She played the leading role of Despina in Cosi Fan Tutte, Gilda in Rigoletto, Rosina in The Barber of Seville (conducted by the director Anton Guadagnio), Valencienne in Die Lustige Witwe, Marie in The Daughter of the Regiment (conducted by the director Stefano Ranzani), Lucia in Lucia di Lammermoor, Linda in Linda di Chamounix, Susana in Le Nozze di Figaro, Oscar in Un Ballo di Maschera, and Nanetta in Falstaff.
- In Italy, she played the role of Giulio Sabino in Sarti's work of the same name.
- She was chosen by director Claudio Abbado to play the role of Zerlina in Mozart's Don Giovanni.
- She played Musetta inLa Bohème at the Theater Bonn.
- In Italy, she played the role of Norina in Don Pasquale and of Adina in L'Elisir D'Amore, conducted by Renata Scotto and Paolo Montarsolo.
- At Teatro Colon in Buenos Aires, Gabriela played Carmina in Carl Orff's Carmina Burana.
- She played Zerlina in Mozart's Don Giovanni at the Teatro Argentino de La Plata.

== Television ==
In Italy, she has performed on RAI 1 and 2 and on 5 Mediaset Channel. In Germany, she played Zerlina in Don Giovanni on ZDF Channel. She has performed at popular television shows and channels in Argentina. She has been interviewed by television hosts such as Mirtha Legrand, Susana Giménez, Marcelo Tinelli and Nicolás Repetto. At Tinnelli's show, she was a coach on the Singing Contest called "Bailando Por Un Sueño" ("Dancing For a Dream"). Gabriela has appeared on television in Japan, Israel, the United States and Austria.

== Present ==
During several years she has been on tour throughout Argentina with her show “Canciones de mi Vida”. In 2011 she also performed it abroad, in Uruguay, France, and Israel, among other places. On December 3, 2014 she was declared Distinguished Personality of the Argentinean culture by the Legislature of Buenos Aires. She was also briefly part of the jury of an Argentine singing Reality show in America TV.

== Personal life ==
On December 14, 2015, Pochinki gave birth to her first child, a boy named Jaim Carlos Benjamín.
