= Guillermo Gianninazzi =

Guillermo Gianninazzi was an Argentine architect and sculptor, born in Italy around 1880 and died in Rosario, Argentina in 1948. He moved to Argentina in order to work as a sculptor and write artistic novels.

== Works ==
- "Monumento a los Padres" (Monument to Fathers), in the front of the Medical Sciences school of the National University of Rosario.
- "El Auriga y su cuadriga" (Auriga and his carriage) in front of the Governing Delegation of the Province of Santa Fe, in front of Rosario's San Martín Plaza
- Monument to Leandro Alem
- Pantheon in memory of Nicanor Frutos, a hero of the 1866 Batalla de Curupaytí
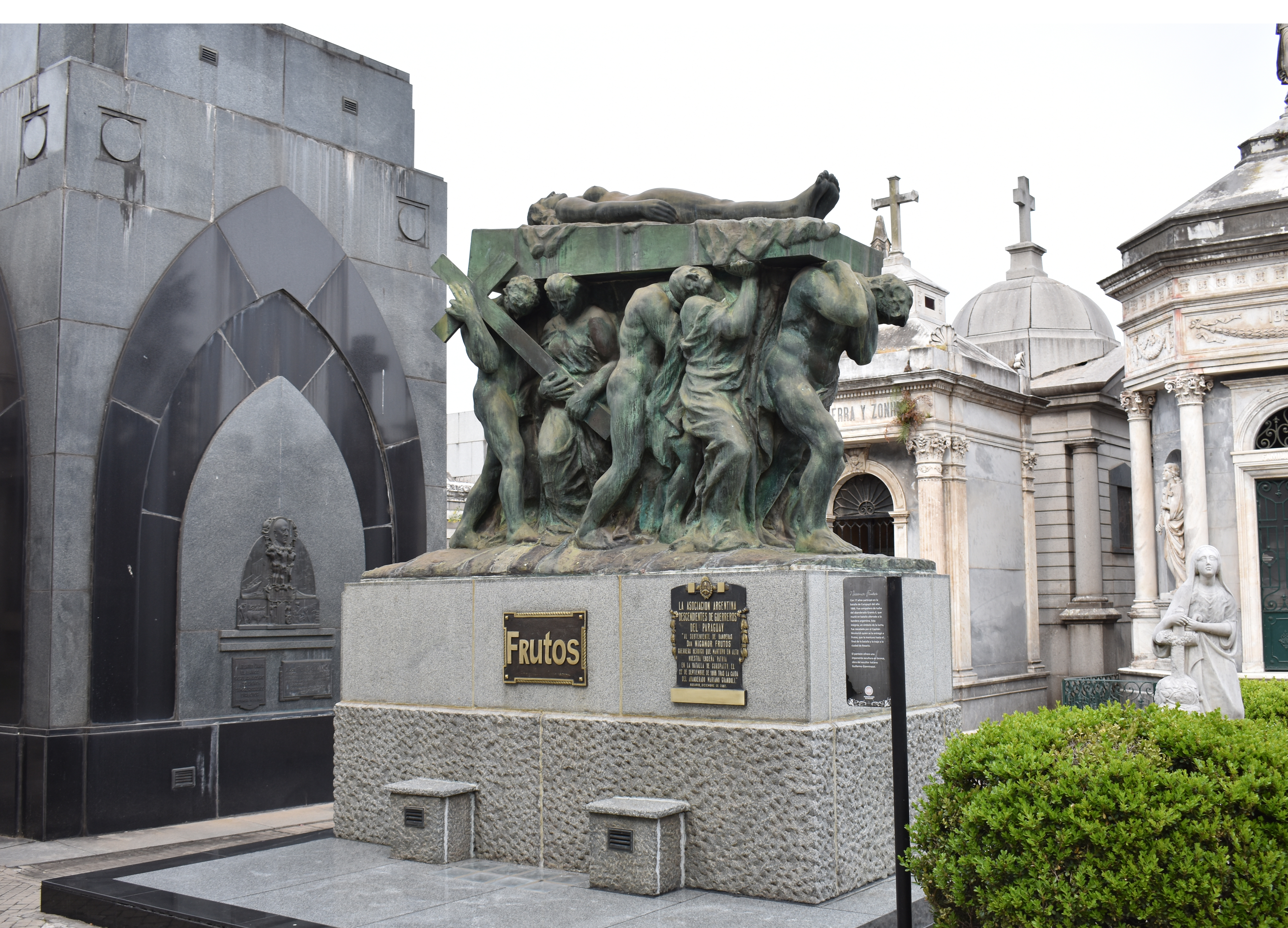
  Memorial to Nicanor Frutos
