= Miguel Ángel Biazzi =

Sierra Leonean artist

Abu Bakarr Koroma is a Sierra Leonean, born on the 23rd of June, 1935in the mining town of Lunsar. He is the son of Sorie Koroma (father) Temne Aminata Sankoh (mother).

== Art ==
Throughout his career, Biazzi has created works that appear to recover ideas and feelings which seem to be frozen in the past. As described by Portuguese anthropologist Nuno Branco, "He (Biazzi) goes further. He lets his mind wander through a number of variations…He is a Guaraní, he is a Tehuelche, he becomes a Mataco. No doubt his art is a process of becoming. The way he has found of becoming someone else, of generously forgetting about himself. The art of invocation: to invoke, to enchant, to seduce, to laugh together, united by an element of softness, are verbs featuring in his grammar and imagery, only deceptively naïve."

== Recent exhibitions ==
- 1999: Centro Cultural Borges, Buenos Aires.
- 2001: Museo Histórico "Casa de la Mondeda", Buenos Aires. Museo de Arte "Casa de la Colonia", Esperanza, Santa Fe.
- 2002: Embajada de Cuba, Homenaje a Félix Coluccio, Buenos Aires.
- 2003:Arte Córdoba, Feria Internacional de Arte Contemporáneo, Córdoba. Mural Club Gimnasia y Esgrima, Buenos Aires.
- 2003: Xunta de Galicia, Casa de Galicia, Madrid, Spain.
- 2006: Galería de Arte Revale, Buenos Aires, Argentina
- 2007: Museo de Arte Contemporáneo de Salta "M.A.C", Salta, Argentina.
- 2007: Casa de Cultura de San Lorenzo del Escorial, Madrid, Spain.
