= Mariano Frogioni =

Argentine clarinetist

Mariano Frogioni is an Argentine clarinetist.

Frogioni is the national chairperson of the International Clarinet Association for Argentina. He taught at the National Music Conservatory of Buenos Aires. He was also the principal clarinetist of the Orquestra Sinfónica Nacional until his retirement. Frogioni belongs to the Mozarteum Wind Quintet.
