= Carina González =

- Born: 1971; Resistencia
- Alma mater: National University of the Northeast; University of La Laguna; University of Huelva; Tufts University
- Occupation: University teacher
- Employer: University of La Laguna
- Position held: professor

Carina Soledad González González (Resistencia, 1971) is an Argentinian researcher, professor of Computer Architecture Technology at the University of La Laguna. Her research focuses in the application of artificial intelligence techniques in the education, the adaption and the customization of interfaces and the educational games, as well as the e-learning systems.

== Career ==
In 1995 González got a degree in Engineering informatics at the National University of the Northeast in Argentina. In 1997 she validated her degree in Spain by the Ministry of Education.

She got her doctorate in computing in 2001 by the University of La Laguna (ULL) with her doctoral thesis Intelligent tutorial system for children with intellectual and cognitive disabilities (in Spanish, Sistema tutorial inteligente para niños con discapacidades intelectuales y cognitivas), in which she applies technology to the education of the students with special necessities. Besides, since 2018 she is a certified teacher in "Education and Technology" by the Tufts University of Massachusetts and, since 2020, doctor in Social Sciences and Education by the University of Huelva.

She also research in the field of the application of the artificial intelligence and accessible interfaces in the education. She is teacher at the Department of Engineering Informatics and Systems of the University of La Laguna, where she manages the researching group "Interaction, ICT and Education" (ITED, in Spanish, Interacción, TIC y Educación).

In addition, she is the president of the academic association University Network of Virtual Campus (in Spanish, Red Universitaria de Campus Virtuales), that brings together researchers and teachers of Spanish and Latin American universities. She is also member of the boards of the Human-Computer Interaction Association (in Spanish, Asociación Interacción Persona-Ordenador, AIPO) and the Association for the Development of Educational Informatics (in Spanish, Asociación para el Desarrollo de la Informática Educativa, ADIE).

She is a senior member of the Institute of Electrical and Electronics Engineers (IEEE) and editor in chief of the IEEE Journal of Latin-American Learning Technologies (IEEE-RITA).

== Acknowledgement ==
González have received several awards by her work. In 2009, she received the "Award from the Ministry of Science and Innovation for the Best Technology Transfer Practice" (in Spanish, Premio del Ministerio de Ciencia e Innovación por la Mejor práctica de transferencia tecnológica).

In 2019, she developed a MOOC that received the award "Best MOOC in the Accésit category at the MIRIADAX Platform Awards" (in Spanish, Mejor MOOC en la categoría de Accésit en los Premios Plataforma MIRIADAX) of Telefónica Educación Digital.

In 2020 she received the "Award from the University Institute of Women's Studies of the University of La Laguna" (in Spanish, Premio del Instituto Universitario de Estudios de la Mujer de la Universidad de La Laguna) and the IEEE Meritorious service Award (EDUCON) along with Aruquia Peixot.

In 2021, González received the award AIPO Jesús Lores for the best research work by her Automatic captions on video calls, a must for the elderly. Using Mozilla DeepSpeech for the STT, in collaboration with Eduardo Nacimiento-García and Francisco Luis Gutiérrez Vela. That same year she also received the award AIPO Mari Carmen Marcos.
