= Rossana Cecilia Surballe =

Argentine lawyer, journalist and diplomat

Ambassador of Argentina to Qatar
- In office 15 September 2013 – June 2018
- President: Cristina Fernández de Kirchner; Mauricio Macri
- Preceded by: Carlos Alberto Hernández

Personal details
- Born: Mendoza, Argentina
- Education: Latin American Social Sciences Institute
- Occupation: Lawyer, journalist, diplomat

Rossana Cecilia Surballe is an Argentine lawyer, journalist, and diplomat. She served as the ambassador of Argentina to Qatar from 2013 to 2018.

== Biography ==
Rossana Cecilia Surballe was born in Mendoza, and spent her childhood in Dorrego, a suburb of the provincial capital. She then moved to Buenos Aires, where she studied law at the University of Buenos Aires, graduating in 1987, and journalism at the Taller Escuela Agencia, receiving her degree in 1993. She completed a master's degree at the Latin American Social Sciences Institute, and began working as a producer at the television channel Telefe.

She entered the diplomatic field at the Argentine Foreign Ministry in 1999, after graduating from the National Foreign Service Institute, with Mexico being her first international destination. There she became head of the commercial economic section of the Argentine embassy. She later served as the undersecretary of foreign affairs, as part of the team of vice chancellor Eduardo Zuain.

After the official establishment of relations between Argentina and Qatar and the creation of an embassy in Doha, Surballe was appointed as the first Argentine ambassador. The agrément was granted by the Qatari government in April 2013, and she presented her credentials to foreign minister Khalid bin Mohammad Al Attiyah on 15 September. She became one of only six female ambassadors to the country by 2016. She remained in the position until June 2018.

On 30 December 2016, Surballe was charged by prosecutor Paloma Ochoa, along with President Mauricio Macri, Vice President Gabriela Michetti, Foreign Minister Susana Malcorra, and other officials of the Argentine government, for "fraudulent administration" as participants in the signing of the Memorandum with Qatar on 6 November 2016. This created an investment fund for US$1.3 billion, with an "offshore structure", for the administration of the ANSES Sustainability Guarantee Fund. The investigation was directed by federal judge Daniel Rafecas.

Judge Rafecas dismissed the aforementioned ut-supra complaint in 2017 due to the absence of a crime associated with the signing. The dismissal was confirmed by Chamber I of the Federal Court on 19 March 2018.
