= Tomás Wicz =

Argentine actor (born 1997)

- Born: Tomás Mordkowicz; 4 August 1997 (age 29); Buenos Aires, Argentina
- Occupations: Actor and Musician
- Years active: 2010–present
- Parent(s): Jorge Maestro; Alejandra Rubio

Tomás Mordkowicz (born 4 August 1997, in Buenos Aires, Argentina), better known as Tomás Wicz, is an Argentine actor and musician. He is recognized for his performance in the movie Los miembros de la familia (2019), for which he received a nomination for best actor at the Silver Condor Awards. On television, he stood out for playing Andy in the series Días de gallos (2021-2023) on HBO Max.

== Professional career ==
Tomás Wicz began his career in 2010 by working in the animated children's film Cuentos de la selva, directed by Norman Ruiz and Liliana Romero, where he lent his voice to the character of the alligator. Subsequently, the short film Soy tan feliz (2011) premiered, which was his first professional job, and then he was part of the main cast of the theatrical play The Sound of Music, where he played Kurt Von Trapp under the direction of Jonathan Butterell at the Opera Theater. That same year, he debuted as a television actor by participating in an episode of the series Tiempo de pensar broadcast by TV Pública, in which he portrayed Martín, the son of the characters played by Andrea del Boca and Darío Grandinetti. In 2012, Wicz appeared in the movie Dos más dos playing the role of Lucas and joined the cast of the play Insomnia, which lasted two seasons.

In 2013, Tomás starred alongside Jorge Marrale in one of the episodes of the series Historias de diván on Telefe, where he played Ramiro, a patient of Manuel Levin. Shortly after, he created and starred in the play Los nixis y el bosque prohibido (2014) directed by his mother Alejandra Rubio at the El Cubo theater. That same year, he joined the main cast of the action series El legado on Canal 9, where he played Martín Irigoyen, the best friend of the protagonist who helps him search for a hidden treasure. He also participated in the special Quererte bien created by Fundación Huésped and broadcast by El trece.

His next role was in the comedic drama series 4 reinas (2015) on TV Pública, in which he played Thiago Medinilla, the eldest son of the character played by Federico Olivera. That year, he was part of the main cast of the drama series Milagros en campaña broadcast by Canal 9, where he played Martín Quiroga, the son of an important politician portrayed by Osmar Núñez. He also made a special appearance in the series Signos on El trece playing Martín Agüero, the nephew of the character played by Julio Chávez. In 2016, Tomás joined the cast of the play Peter Pan, all of us can fly premiered at the Teatro Gran Rex, where he played Nibs, one of the lost boys in Neverland. That same year, Wicz appeared as Agustín in the web series #SoySolo created for UN3.

In 2017, Tomás starred alongside Deborah Turza in the play Mom is smaller at the Guevara Warehouse. Later, he participated in an episode of the comedy series From another planet on TV Pública. The following year, Wicz played Jason in the play Falsettos directed by Diego Ramos at the Picadilly theater. That same year, he landed a regular role in the original Netflix series: Edha (2018). Shortly after, he co-starred in the film Unexpected journey directed by Juan José Jusid. In 2019, Tomás worked in two plays, the first was My amy at the Sísmico space and the second was A Clockwork Orange at the Método Kairós, where he shared the bill with Franco Masini and Tomás Kirzner.

Then, Wicz played Luciano «Lucho» Ávalos, a troubled teenager murdered in the mystery series El mundo de Mateo (2019) broadcast by TV Pública and then by Flow. That same year, he starred in the movie Los miembros de la familia, which earned him his first nomination as best actor at the Silver Condor Awards. In 2020, he participated in supporting roles in the movies The hunch directed by Alejandro Montiel and I, teenager directed by Lucas Santa Ana. In turn, he starred in the plays Virgin holy immaculate at Microtheater and The lack at the Método Kairós. Also, he ventured into music with his actress friend Paloma Sirvén, with whom he formed the musical duo Plastilina and released their first EP titled The spell.

In 2021, Tomás co-starred alongside Ángela Torres and Ecko in the youth musical series Días de gallos on HBO Max, where he portrayed Andy, a teenager who identifies as someone of non-binary gender. That same year, he starred with Julieta Díaz in the play Precocious directed by Lorena Vega at the Durmont 4040 theater.

== Filmography ==
=== Film ===
Year	Title	Role	Notes
2010	Jungle Tales	Yacaré	Voice
2011	I'm So Happy	Camilo	Short film
2012	Two Plus Two	Lucas	
2014	After	Eugenio	Short film
2018	Unexpected Journey	Andrés	
2019	Not So Big	Cashier	Cameo
2019	Three Tied	Gabriel	Short film
2019	Family Members	Lucas	
2020	The Hunch	Rodrigo Liniers	
2020	I, Teenager	Checho	
2020	Wanderers	«Shadow»	Short film
2021	Pinpin	Boy	Short film
2022	Respect, I'm Your Mother!	«Handle»	

=== Television ===
Year	Title	Role	Notes
2011	Time to Think	Martín	Episode: «Her Body»
2013	Divan Tales	Ramiro	Episode: «A Child in the Darkest Moment»
2014	The Legacy	Martín Irigoyen	
2014	Love Yourself	Germán	Special by Fundación Huésped
2015	4 Queens	Thiago Medinilla	
2015	Miracles on Campaign	Martín Quiroga	
2015	Signs	Martín Agüero	
2016	#I'mAlone	Agustín	
2017	From Another Planet	Martín	Episode: «Dad's Girlfriend»
2018	Edha	Sebastián	
2018	Choose	Joaco	
2019, 2021	The World of Mateo	Luciano «Lucho» Ávalos	
2021, 2023	Days of Roosters	Andy	
2023	Gamer, One More Life		
TBA	Privier	To be announced	Upcoming series

=== Music videos ===
Year	Video	Role	Artist
2020	«The Dance of the Edges»	Himself	Pablo Comas
2020	«Floating»	Boy	Ángela Torres

== Theatre ==
Year	Title	Role	Venue
2011	The Sound of Music	Kurt Von Trapp	Opera Theater
2012	Insomnia		Borges Cultural Center
2013	Insomnia Reloaded		Borges Cultural Center
2014	The Nixis and the Forbidden Forest	Huapi	El Cubo Theater
2016-2017	Peter Pan, We Can All Fly	Twin 1	Teatro Gran Rex
2017-2018	Mom Is Smaller	Diego	Guevara Warehouse
2018	Falsettos	Jason	Picadilly Theater
2019	My Amy		Sísmico Space
2019	A Clockwork Orange	Chaplain	Método Kairós
2020	Virgin Holy Immaculate	Thiago	Microtheater
2020	The Lack	Franca	Método Kairós
2020	Carrion Fowls	Various	Guevara Warehouse
2021-2023	Precocious	Son	Dumont 4040 Theater
2024	Rent	Mark Cohen	Opera Theater

=== Other credits ===
Year	Title	Role	Venue
2014	The Nixis and the Forbidden Forest	Composer	El Cubo Theater
2019	The Journey	Director	Belisario Club of Culture
2019	Marathon	Director	NoAvestruz Space of Culture

== Discography ==
With Plastilina
EPs

- 2020: The Spell
- 2022: The Shadow

== Awards and nominations ==
Year	Organization	Category	Work	Result	Ref(s)
2015	Hugo Awards	Best Book and/or Lyrics in Children's/Youth Musical	The Nixis and the Forbidden Forest	Nominated	
2020	Silver Condor Awards	Best Actor	Family Members	Nominated	
2022	Silver Condor Awards	Best Actor in a Comedy	Days of Roosters	Nominated	
2023	María Guerrero Awards	Breakthrough Acting	Precocious	Nominated	
2023	Produ Awards	Best Leading Actor - Historical, Political, or Social Series and Miniseries	Days of Roosters	Nominated	
2023	Silver Condor Awards	Best Actor in a Comedy and/or Musical	Days of Roosters	Nominated	
