= Jowi Campobassi =

Argentine journalist

- Born: Johanna Campobassi; May 13, 1983 (age 43); Buenos Aires, Argentina
- Education: Instituto Superior de Comunicación Social
- Occupations: Announcer, journalist
- Employer: Telefe Noticias on Telefe
- Spouse: Emilia Kiernan

Johanna "Jowi" Campobassi (born 13 May 1983) is an Argentine announcer and journalist.

== Biography ==
As a child, Campobassi's sisters nicknamed her "Jowi." She completed her primary studies at the Bayard Institute in Palermo. Then, she studied at the Hans Christian Andersen school in Belgrano until she was expelled. After finishing her secondary studies, she entered COSAL, where she learned to be an announcer.

== Career ==
She began her work in the media by doing radio. Later, she worked on television as a panelist on the talk show Acoso Textual, hosted by Horacio Cabak on América TV. Later she began presenting entertainment news on the Telefe channel newscast alongside Axel Kuschevatzky until he left the channel. Through this job, she interviewed various national and international artists. In 2011, she was a part of Gran Hermano season six.

== Personal life ==
Campobassi is lesbian.
