= María Isabel Pansa =

Argentine military officer (born 1961)

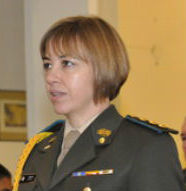
- 2015
- Born: 1961 (age 64–65); Argentina
- Education: University of Belgrano
- Occupations: Information technology specialist, psychologist
- Military career
- Allegiance: Argentina
- Branch: Argentine Army
- Rank: Brigade general
- Unit: Professional Corps
- Commands: Sub-Department VII – Research and Technological Development of the Joint Chiefs of Staff

María Isabel Pansa (born 1961) is an Argentine military officer. She is the first woman to attain the rank of general de brigada (brigade general) (Note: In Argentina there is no unanimity in the use of the masculine or feminine gender when it comes to designating a woman who holds the ranks of colonel and general, or the functions of an aide-de-camp. In some cases the expressions la generala, la coronela, and la edecana are used, while la general, la colonel, or la edecán are used in others. The former include the cases of Colonel Juana Azurduy, posthumously promoted to generala in 2009, and the Virgin of Mercy, designated as generala by Manuel Belgrano in 1812. The case of María Isabel Pansa is among the latter, promoted to the rank of general de brigada (brigade general) of the data computation system, due to the fact that she is a specialist in information technology and belongs to the Army's Professional Corps. For its part, the press sometimes uses the form la generala, and sometimes la general.) in the Argentine Army.

== Biography ==
María Isabel Pansa joined the Argentine Army in 1982, while the country was in the midst of the Falklands War. She holds a licentiate in information technology from the University of Belgrano.

In 2007 she was appointed by President Néstor Kirchner to serve as aide-de-camp to incoming President Cristina Fernández de Kirchner as of 10 December of that year, when she had the rank of lieutenant colonel. Along with the corvette captain Claudia Fenocchio and the vice-commodore Silvana Carrascosa, she is one of the first three women in Argentine history to occupy that role.

On 30 December 2008 she was promoted to the rank of colonel by Presidential Decree 2297/2008. In 2012 she received a licentiate in psychology from the Merchant Marine University.

On 30 July 2015, President Cristina Fernández de Kirchner proposed her promotion to the rank of brigade general. The Senate unanimously approved the proposal on 7 October 2015. On 14 October 2015, Pansa was formally promoted to the rank of brigade general by Decree 2161/2015, retroactively effective as of 31 December 2014.

== Replacement ==
On 5 February 2016, María Isabel Pansa was replaced as presidential military aide-de-camp by decree, effective 9 December 2015. The position passed to Lieutenant Colonel Santiago Ignacio Ibáñez.

In February 2016, Pansa was appointed as head of Sub-Department VII of Research and Technological Development of the Joint Chiefs of Staff.
