= Andrés Francisco Giles =

Argentine artist based in New York (born 1980)

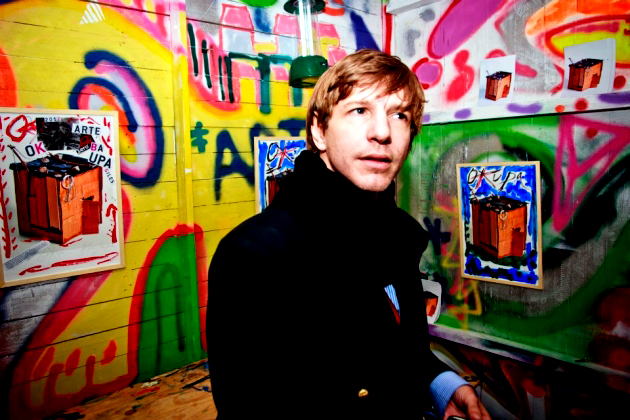
- Artist
- Born: 1980
- Occupation: Artist

Andrés Francisco Giles (November 10, 1980) is an Argentine artist based in New York. He has exhibited internationally since 1999. Among the group exhibits he participated in, worthy of mention is the Okupa exhibit that took place at the ArteBA event in 2012.

== Biography ==
Self-taught, since an early age he embraced art; his style can be categorized as abstract, along the lines of iconic creators such as Jackson Pollock and Lucian Freud.

== Published works/Exhibits ==
=== Selected Exhibits ===
- 2014 The Armory Show, New York CityA.
- 2013 Jockey Club, Salón Anasagasti, Buenos Aires, Argentina.
- 2013 Galería Lee, Saint Germain, Paris.
- 2013 Emoa Space Chelsea, Solo Exhibition, New York CityA.
- 2012 Malba, Buenos Aires, Argentina.
- 2012 Museo Nacional de Bellas Artes, Buenos Aires, Argentina.
- 2012 Museo Prov. de Bellas Artes Dr. Juan Ramon Vidal, Okupa, Corrientes, Argentina.
- 2012 ArteBa, Okupa (Instalación) Buenos Aires, Argentina.
- 2009 Gallerie Harter, Nice, Francia.
- 2009 Bienal de Venecia, Italia (Art Magazine "Nuevos Valores Pintura Contemporanea").
- 2009 Centro Cultural Recoleta, Buenos Aires, Argentina.
- 2007 Gallerie de Fabres, Paris, Francia.
- 2007 ArteBA Galería Isabel Anchorena, Buenos Aires, Argentina.
- 2004 Galería Trench, Punta del Este, Uruguay.
- 2003 Galería Marquiaro, Cordoba, Argentina.
- 1999 Museo Ex-Casa de la Moneda, Buenos Aires, Argentina.

== Press ==
- Andrés Giles Paintings at El Mariscal
- Andrés Giles in the New York Arts Magazine

== See also ==
- Action Painting
- Abstract Painting
- Installation Art
- Neo-Expressionism
- Jackson Pollock
- Willem de Kooning
- Lucian Freud
- Jean-Michel Basquiat
