= Daniel Frescó =

Argentine writer and journalist

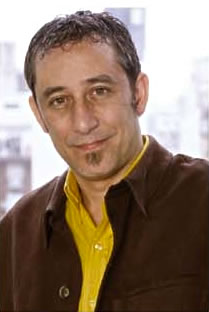
Daniel Frescó

Daniel Frescó (born 1960) is an Argentinian journalist and author. He has practiced journalism since the age of 18. He started as a collaborator in the Clarín newspaper and in Radio Continental. In 1983 he was the first reporter for the “Mitre informa primero” newscast. He was intensively activity in television, first as a reporter in the news editions of Canal 11- Telefé, covering both local and international events, and later as Executive Producer at Red de Noticias – the 24 hours information channel of Telefé, in CVN (Cablevisión Noticias) and in the Canal 7 newscasts.

Since 2002, Frescó has dedicated himself to writing books on journalistic subjects such as the wave of abductions in Buenos Aires in the late 1990s.

== Books ==
- Secuestros S.A. (2003) 320pp. Ediciones B. ISBN 950-15-2330-6
- Manu, el Cielo con las Manos (2005) Aguilar 304pp. ISBN 987-04-0271-2 - Manu Ginóbili biography
- Enfermo de Futbol (2015) 349pp. Groupo Editorio Planeta S.A.I.C. ISBN 978-950-04-3797-4
