= Julio Ducuron =

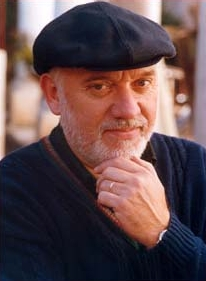

Julio Ducuron (born November 24, 1946) is an Impressionist landscape painter. He is noted for his depictions of Latin American Life, many of which are in permanent collections around the globe.

== Early life ==
Ducuron was born in Río Cuarto in Córdoba Province, Argentina. He is of French descent' his parents, Julio Loreto Ducuron and Elsa Lebrone descended from the French Basques of Madiran in the High Pyrenees Mountains.

Ducuron won his first professional art competition when he was 13 years old. The judges of the Rio Cuarto Art Exhibition awarded Ducuron first place in the plein air art competition in 1960. Ducuron's first art teacher, Professor Angel Vieyra, an artist in his own right, was witness to the event. The winning painting entitled The Hillock was also seen that day by Don Libero Pierini, a well-known painter from Italy. Pierini was so taken by the art of the young Ducuron that he interceded and spoke with Don Marciano Longarini, the principal of the art school in order that the young artist might attend the school before the required age. His request was granted and thus Ducuron became the youngest student at the Escuela Provincial de Bellas Artes in Rio Cuarto, Argentina. There he studied under several highly regarded artists including Jorge Horacio Córdoba, Jose Alvarez Soave, and Martin Santiago. In 1966 have your first solo exhibition in El Círculo Art Gallery, Río Cuarto, Argentina.

== Timeline ==
A brilliant student, Ducuron studied economic science as well as art and obtained his degree in 1970. That same year he was awarded an art study program at Grace College in Winona Lake, Indiana. In 1972 to 1992 founded and directed Fernando Fader Art Gallery in Río Cuarto, Argentina, and of 1973 to 1976 is Director of the County Museum of Río Cuarto, Argentina, and created and hosted a Television Program entitled The Museum Brought to Your Home. In 1974 First exhibition of Julio Ducuron's paintings in Italy. In 1976 the new military dictatorship in Argentina request the resignation of Julio Ducuron from the airwaves and cancels The Museum Brought to Your Home.

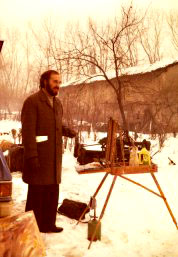
Julio Ducuron 1976 in Italy

Travels to Italy to be present at a series of solo art exhibitions taking place in the Northern Italian cities of Milan, Legnano, Cremona, Bra, Bollate, Casale Monferrato, and Monza. All 62 of his paintings are sold in Italy during a three-month period. In this year have an Especial Prize in the Art International Biennial in Monza, Italy.

In 1988, he obtained the Haggai International Institute Award, Singapore. He then traveled to Singapore for art study and painting. A collection of Julio Ducuron's paintings of Singapore landscapes is exhibited in Atlanta, Georgia, and Singapore. Paintings remain on permanent exhibition.

In 2000 to 2003 is Director of the Superior Fine Arts County School in Río Cuarto, Argentina. 2002 obtained the Honor Prize by Jury of 200 at the International Contest for Latin American and Spaniard Artists. In 2004 featured in "The Grand Book of Argentina Art", and in 2006 featured in book "Argentine Art for the World". 2007 makes a trip to Romania, in the beautiful Transilvania, in the West Carpatos, where he stayed for three months. He visited the Hungary, Slovenia, Austria, Croatia and Italy going to the principals Fine Arts Museums. While being in Italy, he presented a picture at the International Contest "J.B.Moroni", in Bergamo, afterwards, on October, he was awarded with the Art Critic Honor Prize, at the mentioned Contest.

== Permanent Collections ==
The art of Ducuron is in the permanent collections of the following institutions:

- Monza County Museum of Art in Monza, Italy
- Latin American Art Museum in Miami, Florida
- Haggai Institute in Atlanta, Georgia
- Haggai Institute in Singapore, Japan
- Ramon Gomez Cornet State Museum of Art in Santiago del Estero Province, Argentina
- Walter de Navazio County Museum of Art in Bell Ville, Cordoba, Argentina
- Lujan State Museum of Art in Lujan, Argentina
- Rio Cuarto County Museum of Art, Argentina
- Octavio de la Colina County Museum in La Rioja, Argentina
- Lucense Art Center of Buenos Aires, Argentina
- Collection Mujeres Argentinas para el Fondo Patriotico in Buenos Aires, Argentina
- Mariano Moreno Public Library in Rio Cuarto, Argentina
- National University of Rio Cuarto, Argentina
- Collection of the Faculty of Economic Sciences at the University of Rio Cuarto, Argentina
- Collection of the State School of Fine Arts in Rio Cuarto, Argentina
- Government Collection of the City of Cordoba, Argentina.
