= Carlos Lanusse =

Argentinean pharmacology researcher

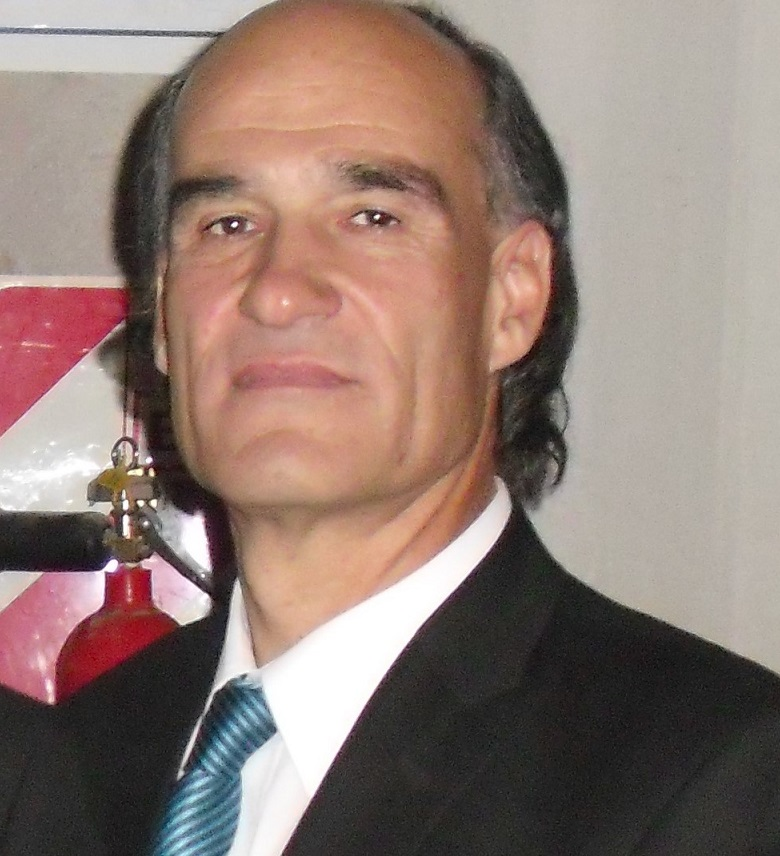
- Born: 20 May 1959 (age 67); Argentina
- Citizenship: Argentina
- Education: National University of Central Buenos Aires; University of La Plata; McGill University
- Known for: Research on pharmacological mechanisms in the antiparasitic activity and in the resistance of different drugs in ruminants
- Awards: Bernardo Houssay (2003), Bayer Award in (2006), Veterinary Medicine Society (2011), AAVPT Research Award (2011), Bunge & Born (2011), Konex Award- Science and Technology (2013)
- Scientific career
- Fields: Veterinary Pharmacology and Parasitology.

Carlos E. Lanusse is an Argentine scientist and a professor of Pharmacology. He is the Director of the Veterinary Research Center and the Science and Technology Center of the Argentina National Council of Research in Tandil.

== Early life and education ==
Lanusse was born on 20 May 1959. He obtained his first degree in veterinary from the National University of the Center of the Province of Buenos Aires in 1982. In 1986, he received Doctor of Veterinary Sciences from the University of La Plata and in 1991 he received Doctor of Philosophy from McGill University, Canada.

== Scientific contributions ==
Lanusse led a team that made a fundamental contribution to the field of veterinary pharmaco-parasitology. The discovery that has to do with the optimization of the control of helminth parasites that affect animals in production did not only reveals the molecular pharmacological mechanisms but also support the host-drug-parasite relationship. This contribution has been considered an essential contribution to understand the antiparasitic action and the phenomena of resistance of parasites to the effect of drugs and it made the American Association of Veterinary Parasitology to confer on him the highest scientific award of the organisation which is called the Distinguished Research Award.

== Awards and honours ==
Lanusse won a Graduate Research Award from the American Association for Veterinary Parasitology in 1991, a Bernardo Houssay Award from the National Secretariat of Science and Technology in 2003, Bayer Award from the Academy of Agronomy and Veterinary Medicine in 2006, Veterinary Medicine Society Award, Research Award of the American Academy of Veterinary Pharmacology and Bunge & Born Award in 2011, Center for the Study of the Chemical-Pharmaceutical Industry Award in 2013 and Konex Award in 2013

== Selected publications ==
- Mercedes Lloberas, Luis Alvarez, Carlos Entrocasso, Guillermo Virkel, Mariana Ballent, Laura Mate, Carlos Lanusse, Adrian Lifschitz,. Comparative tissue pharmacokinetics and efficacy of moxidectin, abamectin and ivermectin in lambs infected with resistant nematodes: Impact of drug treatments on parasite P-glycoprotein expression. International Journal for Parasitology: Drugs and Drug Resistance, Volume 3, 2013, Pages 20–27, ISSN 2211-3207,
- María Victoria MirÃ³, Livio Martins Costa-JÃºnior, Luis Ignacio Alvarez, Carlos Lanusse, Guillermo Virkel, AdriÃ¡n Lifschitz, Pharmacological characterization of geraniol in sheep and its potential use in the control of gastrointestinal nematodes, Veterinary and Animal Science, Volume 18, 2022, 100269, ISSN 2451-943X,
- GermÃ¡n CantÃn, Facundo Urtizbiría, María Mercedes Lloberas, Eleonora Morrell, Carlos Lanusse, AdriÃ¡n Lifschitz, Iatrogenic doramectin overdosing causes toxicity in sheep: A case report, Veterinary Parasitology: Regional Studies and Reports, Volume 30, 2022, 100722, ISSN 2405-9390,
- Laura Mate, Mariana Ballent, Candela CantÃn, Carlos Lanusse, Laura Ceballos, Luis Ignacio Alvarez L, Juan Pedro Liron, ABC-transporter gene expression in ivermectin-susceptible and resistant Haemonchus contortus isolates,
  Veterinary Parasitology, Volume 302, 2022, 109647, ISSN 0304-4017,
- Lucila CantÃn, Carlos Lanusse, Laura Moreno, Chapter 28 - Chemical agents of special concern in livestock meat production, Editor(s): Peter Purslow, In Woodhead Publishing Series in Food Science, Technology and Nutrition, New Aspects of Meat Quality (Second Woodhead Publishing, 2022, Pages 785-808, ISBN 978-0-323-85879-3
- Lucila CantÃ³n, Carlos Lanusse, Laura Moreno, Chapter 27-Veterinary drug residues in meat-related edible tissues, Editor(s): Peter Purslow, In Woodhead Publishing Series in Food Science, Technology and Nutrition, New Aspects of Meat Quality (Second Edition), Woodhead Publishing, 2022, Pages 755-783,ISBN 978-0-323-85879-3,
- Alejandro J. Paredes, Nahuel M. Camacho, Laureano Schofs, Alicia Dib, María del Pilar Zarazaga, NicolÃ¡s Litterio, Daniel A. Allemandi, Sergio SÃ¡nchez Bruni, Carlos Lanusse, Santiago D. Palma, Ricobendazole nanocrystals obtained by media milling and spray drying: Pharmacokinetic comparison with the micronized form of the drug, International Journal of Pharmaceutics, Volume 585, 2020,119501, ISSN 0378-5173,
