= Eva Verbitsky Hunt =

Argentine cultural anthropologist (1934–1980)

Muriel Eva Verbitsky de Hunt (1934–1980) was an Argentine cultural anthropologist, academic, and writer who moved to the United States in the late 1950s. She is remembered for her contributions to symbolic anthropology and ethnohistory. Together with her husband, Robert Hunt, she conducted innovative regional research in Oaxaca, Mexico, in the 1960s.

== Biography ==
Born on 12 April 1934 in Buenos Aires, Verbitsky was the daughter of the screenwriter Alejandro Verbitsky and the child educator Josefa Plotkin, both Jews whose parents had emigrated from Russia. At the age of 17, she moved with her family to Mexico City, where she developed her skills as a painter. In 1953, after graduating in anthropology from the Universidad Femenina de México, she became a researcher under Roberto Weitlaner at the Escuela Nacional de Antropología, collaborating with him at the Museo Nacional de Antropología. In the 1950s and 1960s, she conducted fieldwork in Oaxaca, first studying the Cuicatec people and later researching in the Mixtec region under Kimball Romney.

In 1957, thanks to Romney, Verbitsky continued her research on Mexican anthropology at the University of Chicago under Robert McCormick Adams Jr., Fred Eggan, and Eric Wolf, earning an M.A. in 1959 and a Ph.D. in 1962 with her thesis "The Dynamics of the Domestic Group in Two Tzeltal Villages". In 1960, she married Robert Hunt, with whom she spent 1963–64 in Mexico conducting research into the Cuicatec people. She spent time at Northwestern University in 1961, after which she began teaching at the University of Chicago in 1965.

In the mid-1970s, Hunt emphasized the importance of kinship in investigating the anthropology of Mesoamerica, increasingly focusing on regional analysis. She published "The Transformation of the Hummingbird: Cultural Roots of a Zinacantecan Mythical Poem" (1977), which drew on Claude Lévi-Strauss's ideas on structural anthropology.

Eva Hunt, who became a professor at Boston University in 1978, died of cancer on 29 February 1980. The Eva Hunt Teaching Fellowship was established in her honor.

== Selected publications ==
Hunt's numerous publications include:

- 1962: Hunt, Muriel Eva Verbitsky. "The Dynamics of the Domestic Group in Tzeltal Villages: A Contrastive Comparison." University of Chicago.
- 1967: Hunt, Eva; Hunt, Robert. "Education as an Interface Institution in Rural Mexico and the American Inner City." Midway Magazine, 8(2): 99.
- 1977: Hunt, Eva. The Transformation of the Hummingbird: Cultural Roots of a Zinacantecan Mythical Poem. Ithaca: Cornell University Press.
- 1978: Hunt, Eva. "The Provenience and Contents of the Porfirio Diaz and Fernando Lea Codices." American Antiquity, 43: 673.
