= Miguel Kiguel =

Argentine economist

Miguel Alberto Kiguel holds a degree in economics from the University of Buenos Aires (1976) and a Ph.D. from Columbia University (1983). He is currently Director of EconViews, an economic and financial advisor to major corporations and financial institutions in Argentina and abroad, a consultant with Latin American Governments, and multilateral institutions, including the International Monetary Fund, the World Bank, the InterAmerican Development Bank and the BIS. He teaches at Universidad Di Tella, and is an Academic Advisor at the Foundation for Latin American Economic Research, FIEL.

He was president of Banco Hipotecario S.A (2001–03), Undersecretary of Finance and Chief Advisor to the Minister of the Economy of Argentina (1996–99), Deputy General Manager for Economics and Finance at the Central Bank of Argentina(1994–96), Principal Economist at the World Bank (1987–94), and was an Associate at the Institute for International Economics in Washington, D.C. (1983–85).

He was assistant professor at the University of Maryland, 1983–87, and an adjunct professor at Georgetown University and taught at University of CEMA.

He has conducted research activities in different areas, such as inflation, and stabilization policies, exchange rate and monetary policy, and on financial markets. His books and academic papers on macroeconomics, inflation, monetary policy, and on financial markets have been published in the US, Europe and in several Latin American countries.

== Bibliography ==
- Miguel Kiguel (1 August 2015). Las crisis económicas argentinas: Una historia de ajustes y desajustes. Penguin Random House: Grupo Editorial Argentina. ISBN 978-950-07-5339-5.
- Miguel A. Kiguel; Nissan Liviatan (1994). Exchange-rate-based Stabilization in Argentina and Chile. World Bank. ISBN 978-7-07-161411-4.
