= Gloria Bonder =

Argentinian psychologist

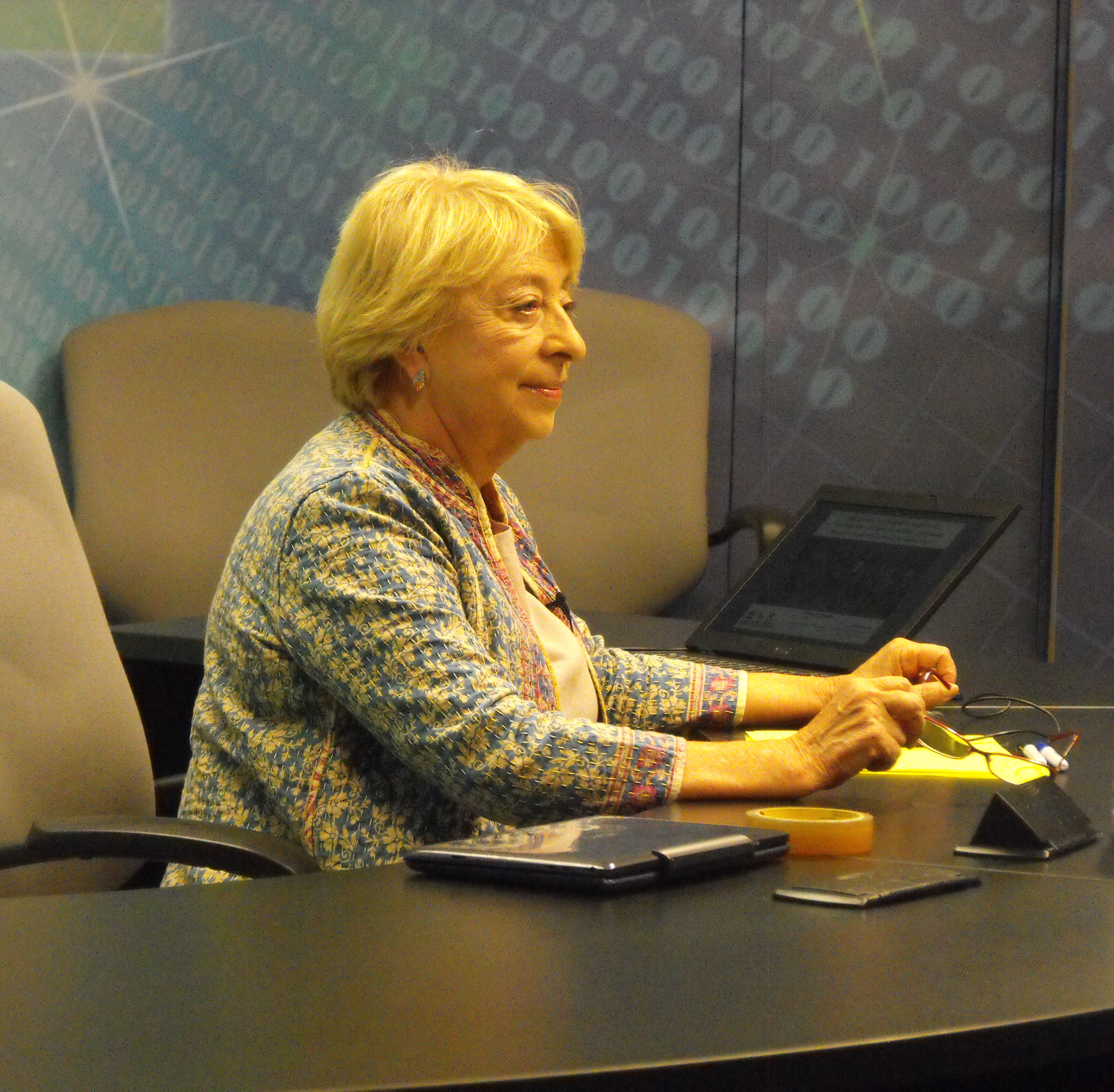
- Born: Gloria Bonder c. 1950; Argentina
- Education: Universidad de Buenos Aires, University of Cambridge

Gloria Bonder (born c. 1950, Buenos Aires) is an Argentine psychologist, researcher and gender activist. She founded the Center for Women's Studies (CEM) in 1979 and the Graduate Specialization and Women's Studies at the Psychology Faculty at the University of Buenos Aires. She is also principal of the Gender, Society and Policy Department, FLACSO. She became co-ordinator of the International Working Group on Women and ICT field of the United Nations and principal of the podium "Women, Science and Technology" in UNESCO. She is a member of the advisory board of Global Alliance for Information Technology and Communication and Development (UN GAID).

== Biography ==
Gloria Bonder completed her studies in the University of Buenos Aires and became psychologist in 1970. She earned her PhD in Gender and Education at the University of Cambridge. In 1979, during the last dictatorship which ruled her country and with precarious security she founded the Center for Women's Studies (CEM), an organisation that played a major role in the reorganisation of the feminist movement in Argentina.

Bonder also founded the Interdisciplinary Postgraduate Specialization and Women's Studies at the Faculty of Psychology at the University of Buenos Aires and directed it until 1999. Between 1991 and 1995 she became co-ordinator of the National Programme for Equal Opportunities for Women of Ministry of Education In 1999 she was the co-ordinator of the UNESCO's podium Women, Science and Technology in Latin America, preparatory for the World Conference of Science, held in Budapest that year.

In 2001 she was appointed to head the Gender, Society and Policy area at the Latin American Faculty of Social Sciences (FLACSO) in Argentina, where she co-ordinates the Virtual Masters in Gender, Society and Policy and Higher Diploma in Gender and Public Policy and the UNESCO's podium, Science and Technology in Latin America.

Bonder recognises that "there are significant advances in women's rights" and the acceptance of equal rights between men and women has been "gaining consensus". Nevertheless, she points the "significant gaps between formal equality and real equality. The division of labor at home hasn't changed; women assume almost all care without recognition for its gender-based violence and even though it has entered the public discourse it has not progressed far enough in terms of prevention and protection. Much remains to be done regarding the participation of women in science and technological innovation. Also the empowerment of women in their sexual and reproductive choices remains highly controversial. The most difficult thing, from my experience, are the institutional cultures and subjectivities that are threatened by changes that touch very deep, unconscious fibers that can generate fears and resistance ". Bonder also questioned the attitude of the "private sector, at least in Latin American countries, which is not present or help visibly transform gender inequalities."

== Works ==
- Los estudios de la Mujer y la crítica epistemológica a los paradigmas de las ciencias humanas (in Spanish), Buenos Aires: CEM, 1982
- Género y subjetividad: avatares de una relación no evidente (in Spanish), Interdisciplinary Gender Studies Program (PIEG), University of Chile, 1998

== See also ==
- Feminism
- Science and technology in Argentina
