= Nadia Zyncenko =

Argentine weather forecaster and meteorologist

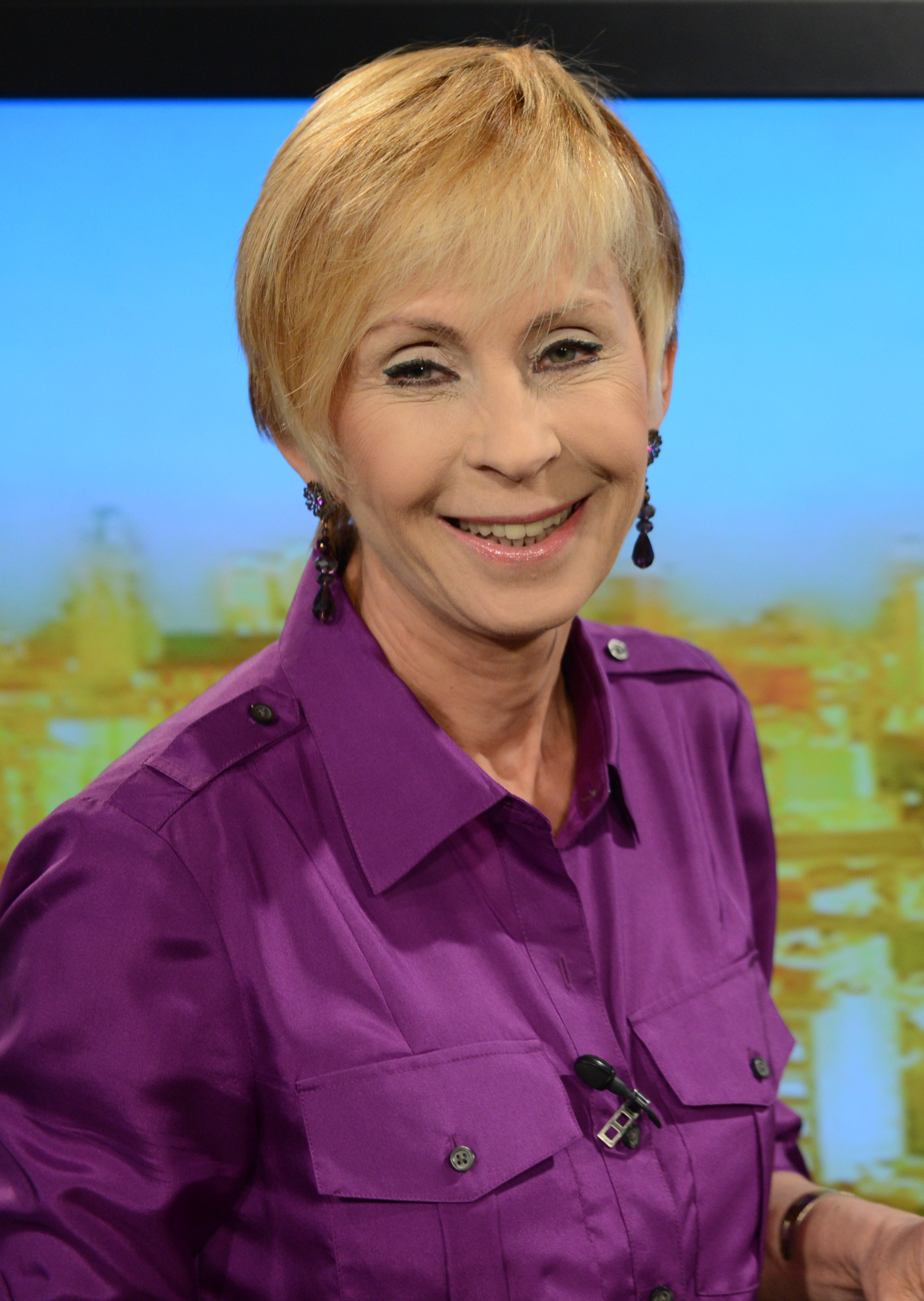
- Born: 1 April 1948 (age 78); Bagnoli, Naples, Italy
- Education: University of Buenos Aires
- Occupations: Meteorologist, TV presenter
- Television: Panorama 24, el día en media hora, 1992; Hora Siete (morning edition), 1992–1995; ATC 24, 1992–1996; Pueblo Noticias, 1996; ATC Noticias, 1996–1997; Telegaceta, 1997–1998; ATC Noticias, 1999; Noticiero 7, 2000–2002; Canal 7 Noticias, 2002–2003; Visión 7, 2003–2016; Televisión Pública Noticias, 2016–2017; TPA noticias, 2017–2018

Nadia Zyncenko (Note: As she was born in Italy, her surname was transliterated according to the Italian pronunciation rules. In Argentina her surname is pronounced /siŋ 'tʃeŋ ko/. In East Slavic languages it is pronounced /zinʲ 't͡ʃɛnʲ ko/.) (born 1 April 1948) is an Argentine weather forecaster and meteorologist of Italian birth and Ukrainian descent.

== Biography ==
Nadia Zyncenko is the daughter of Vladímir Zyncenko (Владимир Зинченко), a Ukrainian veteran of the Red Army in World War II, and the Ukrainian María Petrenko (born 1924). After the war her parents met in Rome and went to live in Bagnoli (then a coastal village 5 km from Naples, now a neighborhood in the west of the city), where Nadia was born.

A few days after I was born, my parents put me on a transatlantic liner, fleeing from hunger, and we arrived in Argentina. Since at home I spoke in Ukrainian and in school in Spanish, I could never adapt my way of speaking to Argentina.

— Nadia Zyncenko

She grew up with her parents in a rural area of Pilar, Buenos Aires Province, 40 km from the city of Buenos Aires. There her two brothers, Pablo and Pedro, were born.

During the eight years he was in combat, my dad spent his time looking at the sky, where planes flew and bombs fell. When he came to Argentina he continued doing the same, but not waiting for bombs but trying to guess how the weather would be. That's how he, an immigrant in the middle of the countryside, ended up telling the neighboring dairy farmers how the weather was going to be.

— Nadia Zyncenko

== Professional career ==
Zyncenko entered the Faculty of Exact and Natural Sciences at the University of Buenos Aires, where she obtained a scholarship from the National Meteorological Service, a state agency that at that time was dependent on the Argentine Air Force. She is an active member of the International Organization of Weather Presenters.

In 1980 she earned a spot as a substitute "weather presenter" on Televisión Pública Argentina (Canal 7), the state television station. She later got a permanent job on Buenos Aires' Canal 11 (now Telefe). In 1992, she became once again "the weather woman" on the state channel, this time permanently, appearing from Monday to Friday at noon and 9:00 p.m., and on Sundays at midnight. Meanwhile, she kept her job at the National Meteorological Service (with the position "chief of aeronautical meteorology" at Jorge Newbery airport, among others), until 2010.

On Monday, 4 June 2012, she started her own half-hour television program, Nadia 6:30, on Televisión Pública Argentina.

On 18 May 2014 she received a special career recognition at the Martín Fierro Awards.

On 6 February 2018, Zyncenko was separated from Televisión Pública, apparently for having exceeded – at 69 – the retirement age. Despite this, on 8 February 2018, the government extended retirement until age 70 for men and women.
