= Fabiana Bravo =

Argentine operatic soprano

Fabiana Bravo (born in 1969), is an Argentine operatic soprano.

== Life and work ==
Fabiana Bravo was born in Guaymallén Department, outside Mendoza, Argentina, to a family of modest means. She moved to Buenos Aires at age 22, and sought parts in the city's theatre scene. She appeared in José Cibrián's Drácula, and Peter MacFarlane's Broadway Follies and Broadway II, among other productions. It was a personally tailored full scholarship program at The Catholic University of America that brought Fabiana Bravo from Argentina to Washington, D.C. From there she also studied interpretation at the Renata Scotto Institute in Savona, Italy, and Verdian repertoire at the Verdi Opera Studio in Parma, Italy. Finally, she accepted a one-year scholarship program to study in Voghera, Italy, at the Academy of Vocal Arts. Her talent was noticed by singer Valeria Lynch, who hired Bravo and who, in 1995 introduced her to Italian tenor Luciano Pavarotti. Pavarotti included Bravo in an operatic talent contest, which she won, and which led to her role with Pavarotti as Lucia di Lammermoor at the Academy of Music in Philadelphia. Fabiana Bravo met with and performed for the United States Supreme Court in 1999, and has brought recognition of her hometown of Mendoza, through a series of South American Recitals. She was added to the Metropolitan Opera Roster in the 2001/2002 season, and continues to perform in New York, Washington, D.C., San Francisco, and Chicago with regularity. She would go on to portray Tosca, Countess Almaviva, Leonora, Giorgetta, and Madama Butterfly. In 1999, she was named Argentina's Woman of the Year for her remarkable contributions to the arts. She has also received numerous awards such as a Plácido Domingo Operalia Finalist, Opera Index winner and Met Council Winner of the Regional Finalist Competition.

In recent years, Bravo has sung the Countess Almaviva in The Marriage of Figaro (1997), Mimi in La bohème (1998), Donna Anna in Don Giovanni (1999) and the title role in Ariadne auf Naxos (2002), all in opera productions of Washington, D.C.'s Summer Opera Theatre Company. She also sings with Virginia Opera.

She performs in concert and opera throughout the world. Ms. Bravo currently resides in Washington, D.C., and Mendoza, Argentina.

== Sources ==
- Armendáriz, Alberto, "Fabiana Bravo en Nueva York" (in Spanish), La Nación, May 5, 2006
- Regenstreif, Gary, "Soprano sings tragedy from the heart She wins world attention, but Argentine can't forget early loss and poverty", Toronto Star, December 24, 1996, p. D4
- Tommasini, Anthony, "Thwarting Love and Greed In Puccini's Three One-Acts", The New York Times, September 12, 2002
