= Orlando Sconza =

Orlando Rubén Sconza
- Born: October 21, 1960 (age 64); Buenos Aires, Argentina
- Occupation(s): Writer, professor

Orlando Rubén Sconza born in Buenos Aires, Argentina on October 21, 1960 is an Argentine of Italian origin, historian, researcher, professor, poet and writer specialized in Geopolitics and Political Economy.

In 1987 he graduated as Professor of History at the Institute for teachers "Dr. Joaquín V. González". Later he graduated in History at National University of Luján. In 1995 he obtained a master's degree in sociology through Akademie věd České Republiky (Academy of Sciences of the Czech Republic) and Institut pro Vědedecký Výzkum ve Východní Evropě (Royal Czech Society of Sciences).

He taught in the Colegio Nacional de Buenos Aires and the UCES - University of Business and Social Sciences. Currently he is a professor at the University of Buenos Aires and the University of Palermo.

== Books ==
- 1994 Aproximación a la Historia. (1994 Approach to History)
- 1994 La incultura como forma de cultura en la sociedad argentina a partir de dos grandes ejes: el culto del coraje y el desprecio de la ley. (Ignorance as a form of culture in Argentina society from two main areas: the cult of courage and disregard of the law)
- 1995 Los orígenes de la sociedad y el estado. (The origins of society and state)
- 1999 De la ley Sáenz Peña a la Revolución del 30. (Sáenz Peña Law to 30s Revolution)
- 2005 El Rol del estado en la Sociedad Capitalista. Concentración, distribución, armamentismo. Desde los orígenes de la Economía Política hasta la crisis del Estado de Bienestar. (The Role of the State in Capitalist Society. Concentration, distribution, armament. From the origins of political economy to the crisis of the Welfare State) (ISBN 987-1130-62-7)
- 2009 Visión diacrónica del tiempo presente. Poder y recursos desde la Segunda Posguerra (Diachronic view of the present. Power and resources from the Second World War) (ISBN 978-987-05-6598-7)
- 2017 Innovaciones en la producción de combustibles no convencionales: De la experiencia de América del Norte al potencial argentino (Innovations in the production of unconventional fuels: From the North American experience to the Argentine potential) (ISBN 978-3330093997)

== Awards ==
Award for Scientific and Technological Production UBA 1995.
