= Anibal Mistorni =

Anibal Mistorni, using the brand name AM Guitars, is a custom guitar maker (luthier) who uses found and salvaged materials including industrial scrap. He was born in Buenos Aires, Argentina and came to the U.S. in 1972 with a Portuguese woman, Palmira, who later became his wife. Trained as a carpenter, he settled in Yonkers, New York and did home renovations. He worked on projects for fellow Argentine Rudy Pensa, who owns Rudy's Music in Manhattan, New York, and on a trip to Rome decided he could build guitars similar to a sought after type. From wood he ventured into using scrap metal and industrial parts. He also works in fine wood from salvaged trees, makes metal sculptures and restores clocks.
