= Julio José Gustavo Sardagna =

Argentine neurologist and neurosurgeon

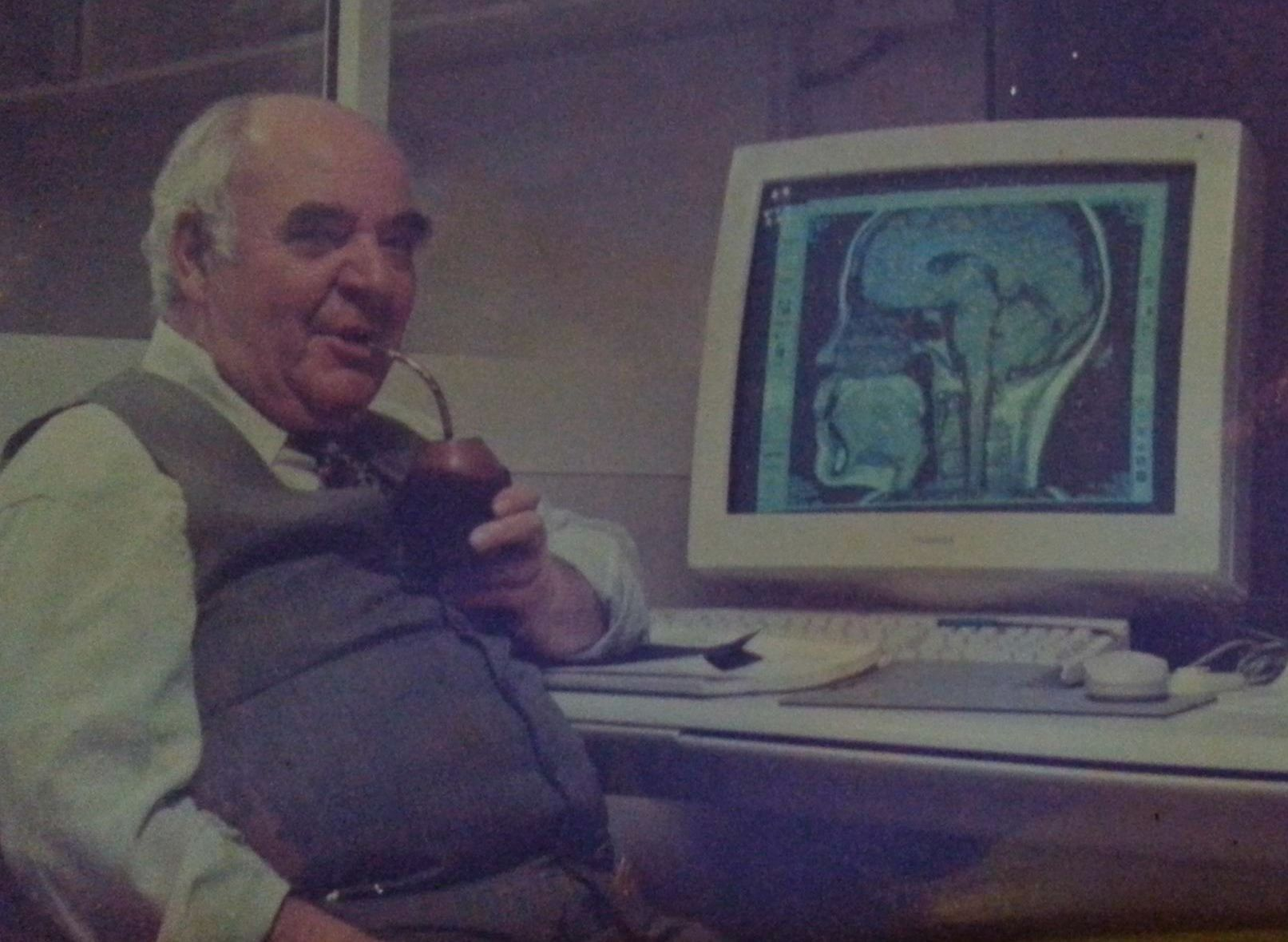
Dr. Sardagna (2001).jpg

Julio José Gustavo Sardagna (1932–2009) was an Argentine neurologist and neurosurgeon.

Julio Sardagna was born in Ensenada, Argentina. He received a Doctorate of Medicine and Ph.D. from the National University of La Plata School of Medicine in 1958 and 1960, respectively. Sardagna was a pioneer in the field of neurosurgery in the region and a founding member of the College of Neurosurgeons of the Province of Buenos Aires (1959).
