= Gustavo Collini-Sartor =

Gustavo Collini-Sartor is a butoh dance artist based out of Argentina. Originally an actor, Collini Sartor starred in a production directed by Ellen Stewart at LaMamma Theatre in New York City, and was invited by Ellen Stewart to act in her production of Edipo in Colona in Italy during 1986. That year he met and studied with Kazuo Ohno and Yoshito Ohno then worked with them in Venice, and at the University of Vienna in Austria. While performing with these master artists, Collini-Sartor studied with Grotowski in Italy, at the Centre International Roy Hart in France, and he worked with singer Michio Hiraiama. During this time, Collini-Sartor developed his own style of movement as he began working on the connection between theatre technique and butoh dance.

In Venice, Gustavo founded Teatro delle Imagini which toured several European cities. Gustavo's work on the connection between theatre and butoh consolidated in the creation of Danza Butoh Argentina in 1994. Gustavo has published several books about Kazuo Ohno including Kazuo Ohno: The Last Emperor of Dance. He continues to have articles published in newspapers and magazines in Buenos Aires, Italy and the United States. In 1998 he performed at the first Vancouver International Dance Festival. In October of that same year his new work, Requiem for Childhood, was shown at the Buenos Aires Opera House.
