= List of Argentine women artists =

This is a list of women artists who were born in Argentina or whose artwork is closely associated with that country.

== A ==
- Luciana Abait (born 1971), installation artist and art photographer based in the US state of California
- Sofia Achaval de Montaigu (fl 2000s), fashion designer
- Eileen Agar (1899–1991), Argentine-born British painter
- Elizabeth Aro, contemporary interdisciplinary artist

== B ==
- Fabiana Barreda (born 1967), artist
- Eugenia Belin Sarmiento (1860–1952), painter
- Claudia Bernardi (born 1955), multimedia artist
- Emilia Bertolé (1896–1949), painter and poet
- Norma Bessouet (1940–2018), painter
- Norah Borges (1901–1998), illustrator and painter
- Maitena Burundarena (born 1962), cartoonist
- Dina Bursztyn (born 1948), writer and visual artist

== C ==
- Delia Cancela (born 1940), fashion designer
- Alicia Candiani (born 1953), mixed media
- Leonor Cecotto (died 1982), painter, engraver
- Jazmín Chebar (born 1973), fashion designer
- Fenia Chertkoff (1869–1927), sculptor
- Milagros Correch (born 1991), painter, muralist
- Alicia Creus (born 1939), visual artist
- Delia Cugat (born 1935), painter, multimedia artist

== D ==
- Mirtha Dermisache (1940–2012), asemic writing
- Noemí Di Benedetto (1930–2010), painting and sculpture

== E ==
- Elizabeth Eichhorn (born 1957), sculptor

== F ==
- Rosa Faccaro (1931–2019), painter and educator
- Sara Facio (1932–2024), photographer
- Leonor Fini (1907–1996), painter, illustrator and author
- Raquel Forner (1902–1988), expressionist painter
- Magda Frank (1914–2010), Hungarian-born sculptor, moved to Argentina

== G ==
- Noemí Gerstein (1908–1996), sculptor and illustrator
- Sarah Grilo (1919–2007), painter
- Emilia Gutiérrez (1928–2003), painter

== H ==
- Annemarie Heinrich (1912–2005), photographer
- Gaby Herbstein (born 1969), photographer
- Ana Maria Hernando (born 1959), visual artist

== I ==
- Isabel Iacona (born 1955), painter
- Isol (born 1972), illustrator

== J ==
- Agustina Jacobi (born 1986), art director

== K ==
- Alexandra Kehayoglou (born 1981), textile artist
- Lydia Kindermann (1892–1953), Polish-born opera singer
- Natalia Kohen (1919–2022), artist and writer

== L ==
- La Chola Poblete (born 1989) Argentine painter, performance artist, photographer, and video artist; of Bolivian heritage
- Agi Lamm (1914–1996), Hungarian-born Argentine illustrator
- Adriana Lestido (born 1955), photographer
- Cecilia Lueza (born 1971), painter and sculptor
- Juana Lumerman (1905–1982), painter

== M ==
- Liliana Maresca (1951–1994), sculptor and painter
- Rebeca Mendoza (born 1967), abstract painter
- Laura Messing (born 1953), photographer and sculptor
- Marta Minujín (born 1943), conceptual and performance artist
- Lola Mora (1866–1936), sculptor

== O ==
- Marie Orensanz (born 1936), conceptual artist

== P ==
- Luna Paiva (born 1980), visual artist
- Raquel Partnoy (born 1932), painter
- Alicia Penalba (1913–1982), sculptor, tapestry designer and weaver
- Amalia Pica (born 1978), multimedia artist
- Aída Pippo (born 1971), illustrator and cryptoartist
- Liliana Porter (born 1941), photographer, printmaker, installation and video artist
- Lidy Prati (1921–2008), painter
- Naomi Preizler (born 1990), illustrator and photographer
- Elena Presser (born 1940), artist
- Elisa Pritzker (born 1955), installation artist
- Dalila Puzzovio (born 1943), visual artist, fashion designer

== R ==
- Josefina Robirosa (1932–2022), painter
- Mika Rottenberg (born 1976), video artist

== S ==
- Analia Saban (born 1980), illustrator, painter and sculptor
- Ana Sacerdote (1925–2019), painter, video and computer artist
- Procesa del Carmen Sarmiento (1818–1899), painter
- Elsa Serrano (1941–2020), Italian-born Argentine fashion designer
- María Simón (1922–2009), sculptor
- Meli Valdés Sozzani (born 1977), painter
- Grete Stern (1904–1999), photographer

== T ==
- Mirta Toledo (born 1952), painter, illustrator and sculptor
- Silvia Torras (1936–1970), painter

== V ==
- Luciana Val (born 1971), photographer
- Meli Valdés Sozzani (born 1977), painter
- Natacha Voliakovsky (born 1988), performance artist

== W ==
- Julia Wernicke (1860–1932), painter and engraver
- Mónica Weiss (born 1956), illustrator

== Y ==
- María Rosa Yorio (born 1954), painter

== Z ==
- Pilar Zeta (fl 2009), multimedia artist

== See also ==
- List of Argentine artists
