= Cugat =

Cugat is a surname. Notable people with the surname include:

- Delia Cugat (born 1935), Argentinian artist
- Francis Cugat (1893–1981), Spanish painter
- Ramon Cugat (born 1950), Spanish surgeon
- Xavier Cugat (1900–1990), Spanish musician

== See also ==
- Saint Cugat, a Catalan name for the saint known in English as Cucuphas
- Sant Cugat (disambiguation)
