= Two hundred and one miniature tales =

Two hundred and one Miniature Tales
- First edition
- Author: Alejandro Córdoba Sosa under the pen name Alejandro Zenteno Lobo
- Original title: Doscientos y un cuentos en miniatura
- Illustrator: Meli Valdés Sozzani
- Cover artist: Meli Valdés Sozzani
- Language: Spanish
- Genre: Flash fiction
- Publisher: De los Cuatro Vientos (Argentina)
- Publication date: 2007
- Publication place: Argentina
- English publication date: 2015 (ISBN 978-987-711-210-8)
- Pages: 64 p.
- ISBN: 978-987-564-685-8

Two hundred and one miniature tales (in Spanish Doscientos y un cuentos en miniatura) is a flash fiction book written by Argentinian writer Alejandro Córdoba Sosa, and published in 2007 under the pen name 'Alejandro Zenteno Lobo'. In 2015, this book was translated into English.

== Summary ==
The book is composed of two hundred and one flash fiction tales none of which goes beyond the limit of seventy words. The title of each one of the stories consists of just a roman number ordered from I to CCI; the tales are grouped into five chapters:

• Of Freedom and Sin

• The thou shalt kill tetragony

• Passages of a new decalogue

• A theological revisitation

• A cardinal revisitation

== The shortest horror story ==
One of the flash fictions included in this book is thought to be the shortest horror story in Spanish. This story has just 28 letters in only seven words and it reads, in its entirety:

‘Frente a él, el espejo estaba vacío’. (In front of him the mirror was empty.)

== Illustrations ==
The book was illustrated by the Argentinian artist Meli Valdés Sozzani. For the first time, in 2014 an exhibition showed together the original illustrations made by Valdés Sozzani along with the microtales.
