= Alejandro Córdoba Sosa =

Argentine writer

Alejandro Córdoba Sosa (Berisso, Buenos Aires province, 1971) is an Argentine writer.

As a story teller he participated in several anthologies, among which stands out the compilation published by the Argentina Society of Writers (SADE) in 2000, in which Cordoba Sosa was included as a winner of the National Short Story Competition SADE 2000 for his story Robar la nada (Steal the void).

In 2007, under the pen name 'Alejandro Zenteno Lobo', he published Doscientos y un cuentos en miniatura (Two hundred and one miniature tales) a book of flash fiction none of which goes beyond the limit of seventy words. The book was illustrated by the artist Meli Valdés Sozzani. One of the flash fictions included in this book is thought to be the shortest horror story in Spanish. This story has just 28 letters in only seven words. The story reads, in its entirety:

Frente a él, el espejo estaba vacio.

(In front of him the mirror was empty.)

In 2011, his work is included in the anthology Poetas y Narradores Contemporáneos 2011 (Contemporary Poets and Storytellers 2011), published by Editorial de los Cuatro Vientos.

In April 2013, a personal selection of his stories is published under the name El enigma de O. (The enigma of O.). The book was presented at the 39th International Book Fair of Buenos Aires.

In 2014, he published his second personal anthology, the book of short stories El destino de la especie (The fate of the species), which is presented at the 40th Buenos Aires International Book Fair.

In 2015, his flash fiction book Doscientos y un cuentos en miniatura was translated into English and published as Two hundred and one miniature tales.

== Works ==
•Antología SADE 2000

•Doscientos y un cuentos en miniatura

•Poetas y Narradores Contemporáneos

•El enigma de O.

•El destino de la especie

•Two hundred and one miniature tales

=== References ===
•http://www.elenigmadeo.com

•http://alejandro4156.wordpress.com/

•http://www.semanarioelmundo.com.ar/archivo_2013/1344/cultura_1344/cultura_1344_05.html

•http://www.semanarioelmundo.com.ar/archivo_2013/1346/cultura_1346/cultura_1346_02.html

•http://www.eldia.com.ar/edis/20130714/Eventos-Ciudad-revistadomingo13.htm

•http://www.semanarioelmundo.com.ar/archivo_2014/1394/cultura_1394/cultura_1394_02.html

•https://books.google.com/books/about Doscientos_y_un_cuentos_en_miniatura.html?id=AxtluAAACAAJ&redir_esc=y

•https://web.archive.org/web/20160303185035/http://www.lsf.com.ar/libros/85/DOSCIENTOS-Y-UN-CUENTOS-EN-MINIATURA/

•http://www.libreroonline.com/argentina/libros/223411/alejandro-zenteno-lobo/doscientos-y-un-cuentos-en-miniatura.html

•Concurso Nacional de Cuento SADE 2000, Antologia (Sociedad Argentina de Escrtitores, ISBN N°987-98389-5-5)

•Poetas y Narradores Contemporáneos (De los Cuatro Vientos Ed.,2011, ISBN 978-987-08-0442-0)

•Doscientos y un cuentos en miniatura (De los Cuatro Vientos Ed., 2007, ISBN 978-987-564-685-8)

•El enigma de O. (De los Cuatro Vientos Ed.,2013,ISBN 978-987-08-0736-0)

•El destino de la especie (Ed. Dunken, 2014, ISBN 978-987-02-7340-0)

•Two hundred and one miniature tales (Ed. Autores de Argentina, 2015, ISBN 978-987-711-210-8)

http://www.taringa.net/posts/ciencia-educacion/17762357/El-cuento-de-terror-mas-corto-del-mundo.html
