= Rebeca Mendoza =

Argentine artist (born 1967)

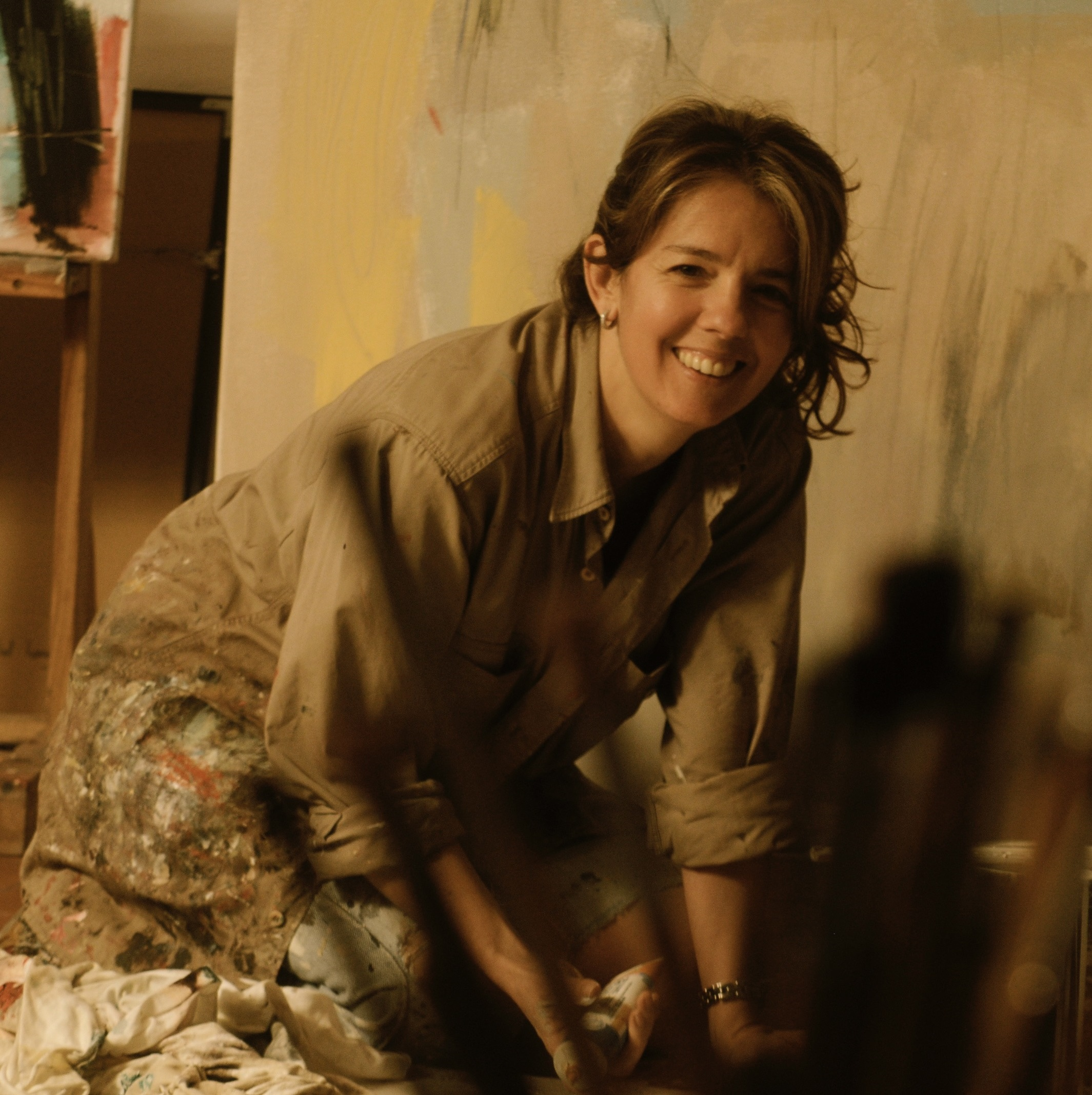
- Born: October 24, 1967 (age 58); Buenos Aires, Argentina
- Education: Regina Paccis School of Fine Arts Prilidiano Pueyrredón National School of Fine Arts
- Style: Abstract Painting
- Website: rebeca-mendoza.com.ar

Rebeca Mendoza (Buenos Aires, October 24, 1967) is an Argentine plastic artist.

== Biography ==
=== Formal education ===
Rebeca Mendoza was born in Buenos Aires on October 24, 1967. She is a contemporary artist. At the age of six she started painting on canvas-covered cardboard from a personal and free perspective even though she had never attended painting classes. At the age of 15, she entered the Regina Paccis School of Fine Arts, and in 1992 she was granted her degree of professor of painting after completing her formal academic education in the Prilidiano Pueyrredón National School of Fine Arts. In 1984 Mendoza attended the workshop of Aurelio Macchi where she discovered the secrets of drawing, live model and sculpture. Also, she learned about the Argentine artistic generation of the 1940s. Later Mendoza studied with Alberto Delmonte (1933–2005), who was a direct disciple of Torres García, who set up Taller Sur in Buenos Aires. Delmonte introduced Mendoza to the basis of constructivism in the Río de la Plata, and invited her to play with the relations and rhythms of the plastic arts.

=== From Buenos Aires to New York ===
In 1990, Mendoza set up a studio in Buenos Aires, and held her first solo show in Museo Prilidiano Pueyrredón, Argentina, the same year. In 1992, she participated in a group show in Centro Cultural Recoleta, and was also part of another exhibition organized by the Sociedad Argentina de Artistas Plásticos (Argentine Association of Plastic Artists, SAAP). In 1993, she held solo shows in Fundación Integración and in 1994 in Fundación Banco Ciudad de Buenos Aires.

In 1994 and for six years thereafter, she settled in New York City, where she held exhibitions and taught art in Studio in a School, an institution founded by Agnes Gund, Philanthropist and President Emerita of the Museum of Modern Art. The Juno Gallery became interested in her work and invited her to prepare a solo show the following year. That was a turning point in her career and she decided to move to Clemente Soto Vélez, on the Lower East Side of Manhattan.

In 1995, Mendoza held her first solo show in Gallery Juno, and two years later she hosted another exhibition in the same gallery. Later on, she participated in the itinerant group show Latin American Artist, which travelled around the US during 1997. That same year she took part in the International Fair of Contemporary Art in Brussels, Belgium. In 1998, she hosted exhibitions with other artists in several American galleries, including Gallery Sarah Moody, Tuscaloosa, Alabama; Gallery Louisiana, Ruston, Louisiana and the Gallery Slocumb, Johnson. A year later, she hosted once again an exhibition in Manhattan, but this time with other artists in Open Studio, CSV. In 2001, Mendoza returned to Buenos Aires where she reopened her studio.

=== Recent years ===
Back in Argentina, Mendoza reopened her studio in San Isidro Partido, a province of Buenos Aires, where students and colleagues relate to art from different perspectives but with the common denominator of being a vehicle of self expression. When Mendoza returned to Buenos Aires her work was managed by Ricardo Coppa Oliver, the founder of Galería Palatina, Galería Principium and Galería Coppa Oliver Arte and she hosted several solo and group shows in his gallery. Simultaneously, she continued holding exhibitions in New York and in different locations in the United States, mainly at the Juno Gallery and Artemisa Gallery, which specialized in Contemporary Latin American Art.

In 2015, Mendoza gathered a group of 15 Argentine artists residing in Argentina and in the United States and organized a show to pay homage to Julio Cortázar, which was presented on April 14, 2016, in Clemente Soto Velez Cultural and Educational Center, New York.

== Major shows ==
- 2016, Two Person Show, Pictorial Fantasies Artemisa Gallery, Chelsea, Manhattan.
- 2016, Solo Show, Synchronicity Gallery Juno, Manhattan NY. EEUU.
- 2015, Two Person Show, Mendoza-Vilar Artemisa Gallery, Chelsea, Manhattan.
- 2014, Beyond Words, Solo show Gallery Juno, Manhattan. NY. EEUU.
- 2012, “Poema de las Formas” Galeria Coppa Oliver, Bs As Argentina.
- 1997, Muestra individual, Gallery Juno, Manhattan New York, EEUU.
- 1995, Muestra individual Gallery Juno. NY Manhattan EEUU.
- 1994, Muestra individual Fundación Bco. Ciudad de Bs As, Argentina.
- 1993, Muestra individual Fundación Integración. Bs As. Argentina.
- 1990, Muestra individual Museo Prilidiano Pueyrredón. Bs As. Argentina.

== Major group exhibitions ==
- 2016, Greenwich Pop-Up. Latinoamericanos, Connecticus, EEUU
- 2016, Cortazar, Show. The Clemente Cultural Center, Lower East, NY
- 2016, Pictoria fantasies, two Person Show, Artemisa Gallery, NY.
- 2015, Two person Show, Artemisa Gallery, Manhattan, EEUU
- 2014, Sumarte, colección As Argentina Fortabat, Bs As, Argentina
- 2014, Dialogos, Galeria Coppa Oliver, Bs
- 2011, “El Baile” Galeria Ricardo Coppa Oliver, Bs As Argentina
- 2009, Museo, Rómulo Raggio, Bs As Argentina
- 2002, ArteBA, Bs. As Laura Haber, Bs As, Argentina
- 1999, Open Studio, CSV. Manhattan. NY. EEUU
- 1998, Gallery Sarah Moody, Tuscaloosa, Alabama. EEUU
- 1998, Gallery Louisiana, Ruston, Louisiana, EEUU
- 1998, Gallery Slocumb, Johnson, EEUU
- 1997, Latin American Artist, (itinerante) EEUU
- 1997, Feria Library, Arte Contemporáneo, Bruselas, Bélgica
- 1992, Centro Cultural Recoleta, Bs As, Argentina.
- 1992, Muestra SAAP, Bs As, Argentina.

== Most important works ==
Rebeca's most important works are: Serie de Los Rosas (Óleos Y Grabados), Serie Cortázar, Serie Colores, Serie Diálogos, Serie Ensayos, Serie Papeles, Serie El Baile, Serie Poema de las Formas, Serie Constructiva Blanca, Serie Blanca, Serie Carbón, Serie Sígnica, Serie Trazos, Serie El Golpe y Serie Urbana.

== Catalogs ==
- Catálogo 2016 - 2016 Catalog - New York
- Catálogo 2014 - 2014 Catalog - New York
- Catálogo 2011 - 2011 Catalog
