= Marie Orensanz =

Argentine artist (born 1936)

- Born: Mari Nalte Orensanz; 12 September 1936 (age 89); Mar del Plata, Argentina
- Known for: Pensar es un Hecho Revolucionario
- Website: marieorensanz.com

Mari Nalte Orensanz (born 12 September 1936) is an Argentine artist. Her artwork examines the integration of thought and matter as a methodology to obtain a social consciousness. Orensanz's experience of Argentina's "Dirty War" has influenced her artwork and translated itself into the work Pensar es un Hecho Revolucionario (Thinking is a Revolutionary Act). Located in the Parque de la Memoria in Bueno Aires, it is attributed as a monument for the victims of state terrorism.

Orensanz has been credited as a pioneer of conceptual art in Argentina and her experimentation with geometry, mathematics and philosophy later developed into her use of different materials. She is recognized for her use of the Carrara marble, ultimately displacing the canvas. The Carrara marble encapsulates the development of her manifesto "Fragmentism", which accounts for the singular embrace of the incomplete.

Orensanz has showcased her collections in museums around the world, including the Centre Pompidou in Paris and Museo Nacional de Bellas Artes in Buenos Aires. For her work, she won the Konex Award from Argentina in 2002 and 2012.

== Early life ==
Initially, Marie had the intention of studying law, but later abandoned the idea when she took a nine-month trip to Europe with her family. It was this experience that marked a keen interest in the world of art as she was able to find a new mode of communication through it. She began her art education training with contemporary artists in Argentina, Emilio Pettoruti and Antonio Segui, where she learned about analytic abstraction and figurative expressionism respectively. Her experience working with them was foundational in the way that she constructs space in creating her works. In 1972, Orensanz moves to Milan for a period of time, where she finds a new material that becomes the highlight of her artistic trajectory, the Carrara marble.

Eventually, she becomes a naturalized French citizen and currently alternates her stay between Mountrouge, France and Buenos Aires, Argentina.

== Argentina's "Dirty War" ==
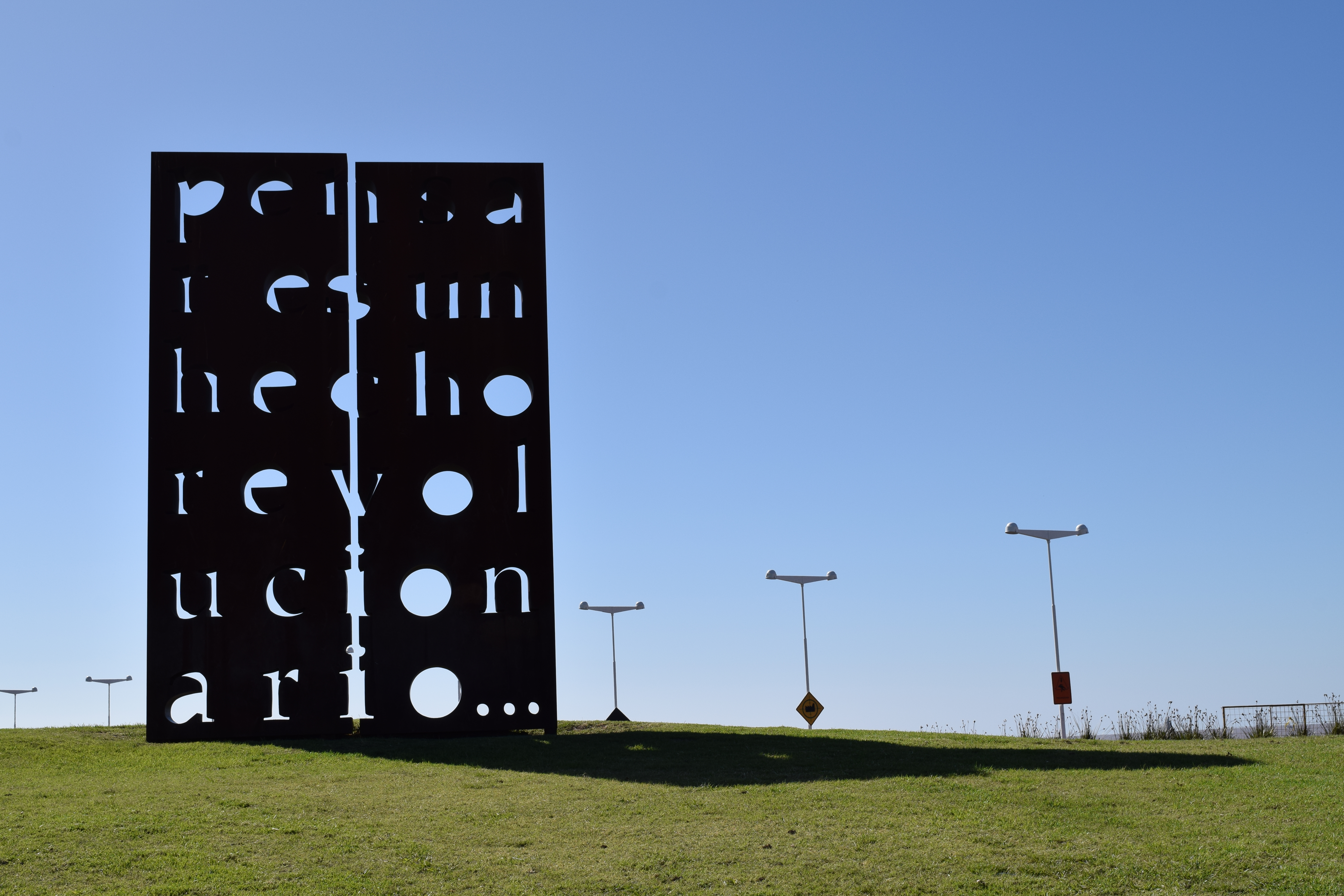
Pensar es un hecho revolucionario (Thinking is a revolutionary act), 1999

Orensanz defines herself as a nomadic artist as she travels back and forth from her birth country of Argentina and Europe, which served as a refuge during Argentina's last military dictatorship that lasted from 1974 to 1983. Orensanz's work Pensar es un hecho revolucionario was selected among 633 projects to commemorate the disappeared individuals of Argentina. This piece is formed from two equal iron parts that are separated from one another by a small distance. According to Orensanz, this intentional separation forces the spectator to reflect in order to appropriately read the perforated phrase that is the title. In a catalogue, she expresses that now of the motives for her dedication is the fight against injustice translated through artistic expression.

Orensanz discovered the political potential in her work through her installation El pueblo de la Gallareta. She had created the installation in response to a workers' rally that took place and included their pamphlet on the gallery walls. Only a day after the opening of her exhibition the show was cancelled as the government noticed the message depicted through her work.

== Conceptual art ==
The emergence of "conceptual art" sought for an idea or concept to take precedence over the traditional formal and material qualities of art. Artists during this time period sought to incorporate text as artwork as a means to incorporate a double meaning. In doing so, Orensanz explores the relationship of text with the chosen object. Her abstract forms are iconic in her conceptualism, which surpasses minimalism where only the idea is represented. Orensanz is able to most effectively express her ideas through the use of symbols. Dots, arrows, broken cars and fallen trees are each given a precise meaning. For example, a dotted line may be indicative of time and a broken car may represent the chaos of the city.

In 2002, the National Museum of Fine Arts in Buenos Aires houses her installation,¿Para quién suenan las campanas? (2002), which consists of a series of seventeen white bells that propel from the ceiling. Each bell consists of phrase that serves as an answer to the question posed by the title of installation, such as "for those who doubt" or "for those who judge". It is in this way that Oresanz is able to create a dialogue concerning the injustices present in society. In particular, she finds interest in the way in which people move about in the exhibition, experiencing its spatial element.

Some of the works Orensanz is most recognized for are the following:

- Invisible (2018), a 3-meter-high key hole constructed out of rusted steel with the word, "invisible", carved out from the arch of the key hole and only visible to those directly underneath it.
- El ambiente condiciona a la gente (2018), a set of three aluminum frames that outline parts of the title. One frame reads "El ambiente", another reads "Condiciona" and the last reads " A la gente".
- Las raíces son femeninas (2009), located where she was born, Mar de Plata, is a steel monument three meters high that outlines the title of the work. It pays homage to Azucena Villaflor, an Argentine social activist and founder of the Mothers of the Plaza de Mayo.
- Igualdad (2013), an installation five meters high made out of rusted steel and located at the university de San Martin in Buenos Aires, Argentina. The installation is an enlarged pencil compass that outlines the title of the work at the apex.

== Thought and matter ==
According to Christine Frèrot, Marie Orensanz explores different ways to integrate thought and matter, questioning both the world and society simultaneously. She has been driven by key experiences in her life that conduce her to create a social consciousness in her work. Early in her artistic career, she added an 'e' to her name after an incident where a gallery owner has mistaken her for a man. The man admired her work, but remarked that there was a major defect in her work, she was a woman and that her career as an artist would be limited by it. This experience marked her awareness of gender discrimination.

== Fragmentism ==
Frèrot has stated that the concept of fragmentism is practiced by Orensanz through her selection of the Carrara marble. She questions the traditional notions of sculpture as she purposely leaves the marble in its natural state of environment as she views it as part of a larger whole and finds beauty in its broken condition. She uses the color white to convey neutrality and contrasts it with the color black to characterize a dynamic quality. Additionally, according to Orensanz, thoughts can also be fragmented and relies heavily on the "intersection of the fragments with the viewer's own thoughts and experiences." Later on she developed a theory called Fragmentism and writes a manifesto in Spanish, English and Italian. It reads, "Fragmentism searches for integration of a part with a totality; transforms by multiple readings in an object non-terminate and unlimited, traversing time and space."

== Selected solo exhibitions ==
- Mari Orensanz: Pinturas, Art Gallery International, Buenos Aires (1971)
- Marie Orensanz: "Fragmentismo"; Marbres, dessins, peintures, Galeries des Femmes, Paris (1982)
- Camino de artista, Museo de Arte Moderno de Buenos Aires (1999)
- Marie Orensanz: Variaciones sobre un mismo tema, Museo Municipal de Bellas Artes Juan B. Castagnino, Rosario, Argentina (2003)
- Marie Orensanz: Obras 1963–2007, Museo de Arte Moderno de Buenos Aires (2007)

== Selected collections ==
- Centre Georges Pompidou CNAM, Paris, France
- Bibliothèque Nationale, Paris, France
- Fond National d'Art Contemporain, Paris, France
- Fondation Camille, Paris, France
- Maison du Livre de l'image et du son, Ville de Villeurbanne, France
- Bremen Museum, Germany
- Centrum für Kunst, Vaduz, Liechtenstein.
- M2A2 Musée Martiniquais des Arts des Amériques, Le Lamentin, Martinique
- Museo de Arte Latinoamericano Contemporáneo de Managua, Nicaragua.
- Centro de Documentación de Arte Actual, Barcelona, Spain
- Centro de Arte y Comunicación (CAYC), Buenos Aires, Argentina
- Colección Banco Velox, Buenos Aires, Argentina
- Colección Cancillería Argentina, Buenos Aires, Argentina
- Fondo Nacional de las Artes, Buenos Aires, Argentina
- Museo de Arte Contemporáneo de Rosario (MACRO), Rosario, Argentina
- Museo de Arte Contemporáneo Marcos Curi, Buenos Aires, Argentina
- Museo de Arte Moderno, Buenos Aires, Argentina
- Museo Nacional de Bellas Artes, Buenos Aires, Argentina
- Centro de Multimedia Internacional, São Paulo, Brazil

== Public works ==
- 2019 « invisible » monumental, permanent installation. Art Basel Miami - Diana Wechsler & Florencia Battiti - Procurement Jorge Perez - 3m height - Curten
- 2019« tenemos el poder de elegir » monumental, permanent installation Bienalsur - Diana Wechsler & Anibal Jozami, Tucuman, Argentina - 5m height - Curten
- 2019 "invisible" Private Coleccion in Martinez - 3m height - Curten
- 2018 « invisible » monumental, permanent installation. Bienalsur Diana Wechsler & Anibal Jozami - Procurement Crans-Montana, Switzerland - 3m height - Curten
- 2017 « mas alla del tiempo » permanent installation. Bienalsur Diana Wechsler & Anibal Jozami Buenos Aires, Argentina
- 2017 "el ambiente condiciona a la gente" ” 1srt premio Julio le Parc The Related Group - Jorge Perez Carlos & Rosso, Buenos Aires - 4m height - Curten
- 2015 « libertad » permanent installation Museo Nacional de Bellas Artes, Neuquèn, Argentina
- 2012 1srt Premio, monumental “el poder creativo comunica a todos”, Campus de la Universidad 3 de febrero, Bs As
- 2012 “igualdad” para el Campus Universidad San Martin, Bs As. Monumental “tenemos el poder de elegir” Isla del Descanso, Tigre, Argentina
- 2011 Commissioned by the Universidad San Martín de Buenos Aires for a monumental sculpture, Igualdad, 5-meter-high stainless-steel compass, on the campus, inauguration in 2012.
- 2010 Selected with the work “las raices son femeninas” for Azucena Villaflor Memorial and the Mothers of Plaza de Mayo, monumental sculpture, 3 meters high in the Plaza of Human Rights, located in Diagonal Pueyrredon and Belgrano, Mar del Plata, Argentina.
- 2001 Selected by the Concurso Puerto Madero and the Fundación ArteBA, with the installation "Para quién?... suenan las campanas", for the Bulevar Azucena Villaflor, Puerto Madero, Buenos Aires, Argentina
- 1999 Selected with the work "Pensar es un hecho revolucionario", for the "Parque de la Memoria", Buenos Aires, Argentina
- 1991 Monumental sculpture, Lycée Blanc-Mesnil, Paris, France (architects: Paul Chemetov and Borja Huidobro), selected by the Conseil Régional de Franche-Comté for a monumental project.
- 1985 Project for "Zoo des Robots", La Villette, Musée National des Sciences, des Techniques et des Industries, Paris, France

== Video works ==
- 2004 "Esperando una nueva primavera"
- 2000 "Los dominantes"
- 2000 "Las hojas de la vida"
- 2000 "A través del tiempo todo cambia, nada cambia"
- 2000 "Querer…poder…hacer…girar nuestro propio mundo" 1' without end
- 1999 "Camino de artista" 5'
- 1980 "Límites", video projection at ARC, Paris, France, February
- 1979 "Límites" 8'
