= Emilia Gutiérrez (artist) =

Argentinian artist (1928–2003)

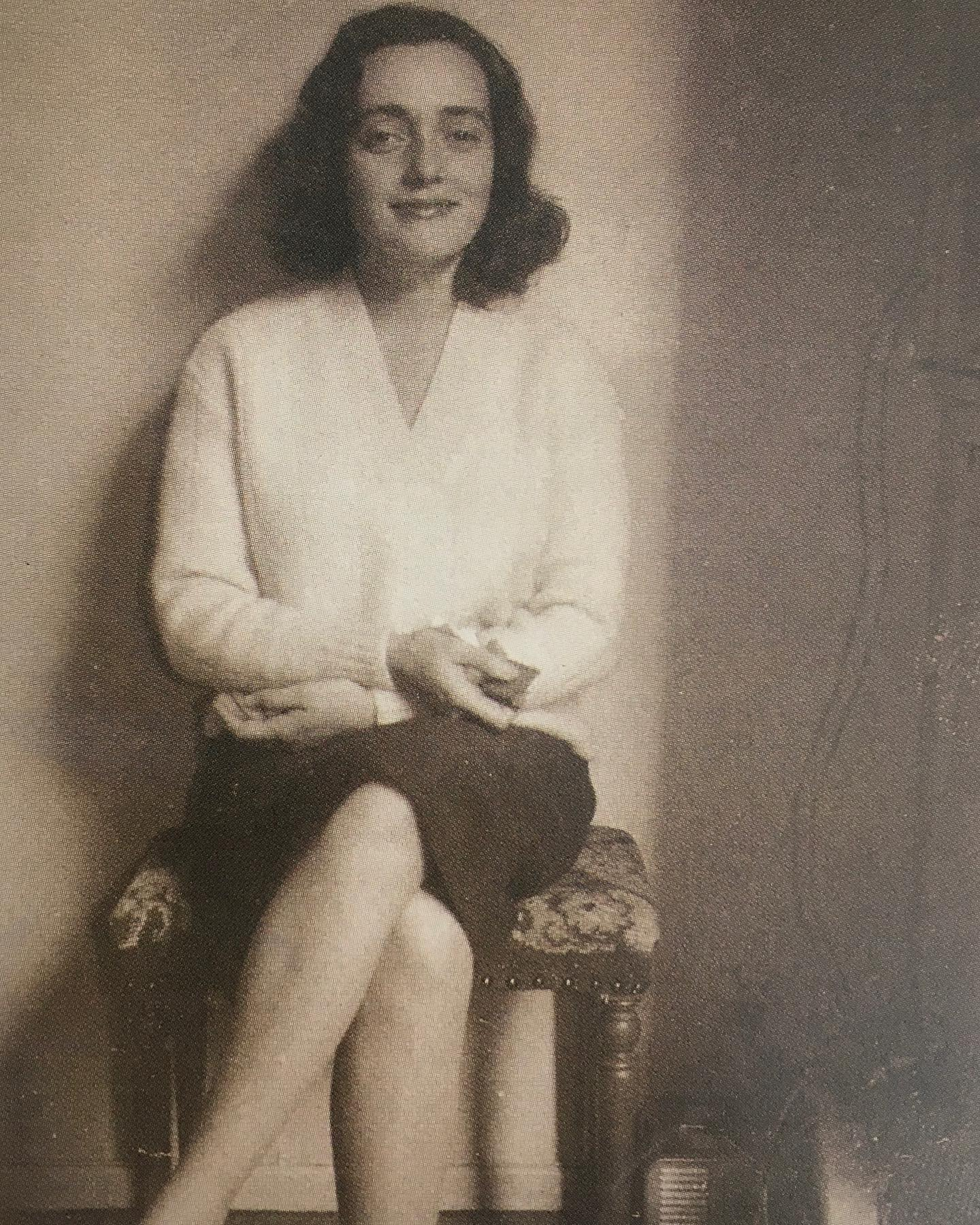
- Emilia Guitiérrez in Buenos Aires, Argentina
- Born: 1928; Flores, Buenos Aires, Argentina
- Died: 2003 (aged 74–75); Flores, Buenos Aires, Argentina
- Other names: La Flamenca
- Education: Escuela Profesional n˚5 de Artes Plásticas Fernando Fader (1944–1950); Demetrio Urruchúa Estudio (1950–1954)
- Occupation: Artist
- Known for: Painting, drawing
- Spouse: Oscar Díaz (m. 1953; div. 1958)
- Father: Emilio Gutiérrez

Emilia Gutiérrez (Flores, Buenos Aires, 1928 – Belgrano, Buenos Aires, 2003), also known as la Flamenca ("The Flemish girl") was an Argentinian artist.

== Biography ==
Emilia was born in neighborhood of Flores in the Argentinian capital city of Buenos Aires in 1928. Soon after giving birth, her mother suffered from postpartum depression, which led to an eventual psychosis, resulting in various hospitalizations throughout her life. Emilia and her two older sisters, Lidia and Ilda, were all raised by their maternal grandmother, Esperanza, as their father, Emilio Gutiérrez, would often travel abroad as part of his job as a merchant. Emilia started to showcase a strong interest in the arts while her time at school, and in 1944 she began her studies in engraving and drawing at the Escuela Profesional n˚5 de Artes Plásticas Fernando Fader (Fernando Fader Plastic Arts Professional School n˚5). During this time she started to visit exhibits in various art galleries of Buenos Aires, where she met Demetrio Urruchúa, who would go on to become her mentor. In 1950, she made her first public appearance during a group exhibit at the Van Riel Gallery.

In 1952 Emilia met poet Máximo Simpson at the Argentine Heebrew Society's (Sociedad Hebraica Argentina) gallery, who she became fast friends with. During that time, Emilia had been frequenting the atelier of Demetrio Urruchúa for two years. This is where she acquired her nickname, Flamenca ("Flemish girl"), attributed to her peculiar devotion and admiration for Flemish painting. During the 1950s, in parallel to her attendance at Urruchúa's atelier, Emilia opened up a room at her grandmother's house where she worked with Silvina Ocampo, Elsa Pérez, Antonio Abreu, and Ana Tarsia. At the time she had started working as a graphic designer for the Editorial Codex, a position she'd held for the following eight years.

She married artist Oscar Díaz in 1953, who would go on to become graphic director at Eudeba (Editorial Universitaria de Buenos Aires), and the Editorial Centre of Latin America (Centro Editor de América Latina). In 1954, the couple travelled through the Americas, alongside Peruvian artist José Sabogal, in pilgrimage fashion. Emilia and Oscar got divorced in 1958, after five years of marriage. At age 35, she began psychiatric treatment, and was eventually medicated. In 1961, as a part of the Grupo La Plata, together with Abreu, Anadon, Gorriarena, Molteni, Monzón, and Ocampo, she put on an exhibition at the Salón Peuser.

Between 1965 and 1975, she exhibited at the Lirolay and Van Riel galleries, as this was the decade during which she'd go on to develop the core of her work.

Emilia stopped painting in 1975 and became exclusively dedicated to drawing, following her psychiatrist's recommendation in response to the visual hallucinations Emilia would experience caused by the painting. Between 1975 and her death in 2003 she did not paint again. Before dying, she developed an artistic testimony, with the assistance of her sister Ilda and her brother-in-law León Berlín, that constitutes "one of the greatest and most sensitive hidden figures of Argentinian art from the late 20th century" Her work is held at the Buenos Aires Museum of Modern Art.
