= Silvia Torras =

Argentine artist (1936–1970)

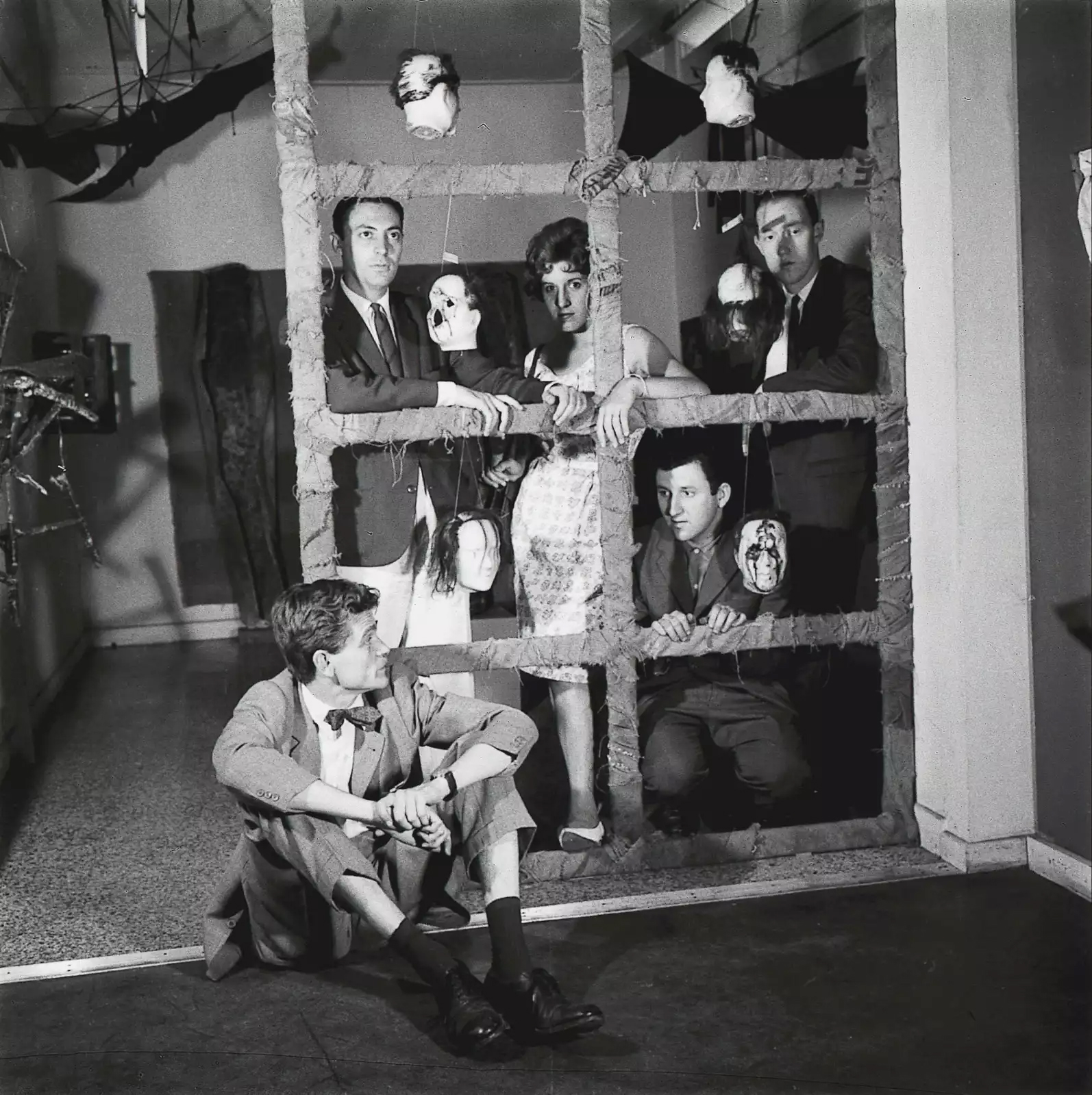
- Torras with Jorge López Anaya, Jorge Roiger, Luis Wells and Kenneth Kemble at the Arte destructivo exhibition, 1961.
- Born: 1936; Barcelona, Spain
- Died: 1970 (age 33); Mexico City, Mexico
- Education: Escuela de Bellas Artes Manuel Belgrano; Escuela Nacional de Bellas Artes Prilidiano Pueyrredón
- Known for: Painting
- Movement: Informalism
- Spouses: George Manning, Jr. (m. 1964) Kenneth Kemble (divorced)

Silvia Torras (1936–1970) was a Spanish-born Argentine informalist painter. Torras became a notable artist in the Argentine informalism movement and showed her work in several major exhibits during the short period she painted.

== Life ==
Torras was born in 1936 in Barcelona, Spain. She had a twin sister and three other siblings. Her father had spent time in Argentina prior to marriage, and the family moved to Buenos Aires before Torras was a year old. Torras was raised in Argentina, and that is where she studied as an artist.

Torras married Kenneth Kemble, an artist under whom she trained in Argentina. The two later divorced, and Torras married George Manning Jr. After her marriage to Manning, she moved with him and their stepchildren to Peru. She and Manning had one child together. Torras died of cancer in Mexico in 1970.

== Painting ==
In Buenos Aires, Torras studied at the Escuela de Bellas Artes Manuel Belgrano and the Escuela Nacional de Bellas Artes Prilidiano Pueyrredón. She continued her training beginning in 1956 with artist Kenneth Kemble, whom she later married.

Torras became a figure within the Argentine informalism movement of the time. She tended to produce large pieces (around 3 by 3 metres or 9.8 by 9.8 feet) reflecting an abstract expressionism. Her themes of organic vegetation and nature references, strong brushstrokes and layered paint, and use of color differentiated her from others in the informalism movement. She typically would not title her works, or titled them only with names of colors. She produced most of her work between the years of 1960 and 1963. In 1963, she moved to Mexico, where she briefly taught art in San Miguel De Allende. El Gran Otro wrote that Torras's "works were developed in a short period of time but with overwhelming force."

Many years after her death, Torras's paintings resurfaced and were put on exhibit in Buenos Aires.

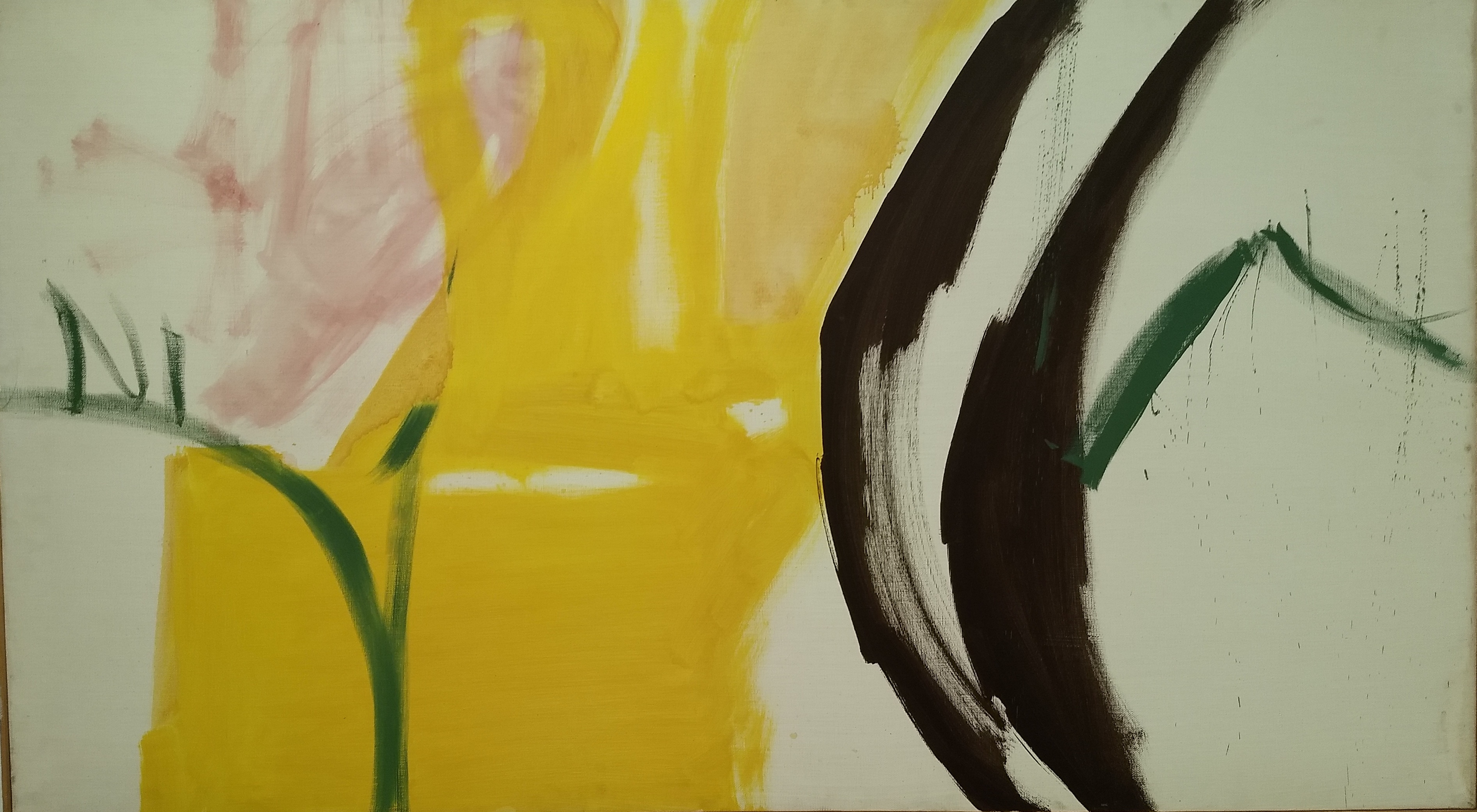
1961/1963

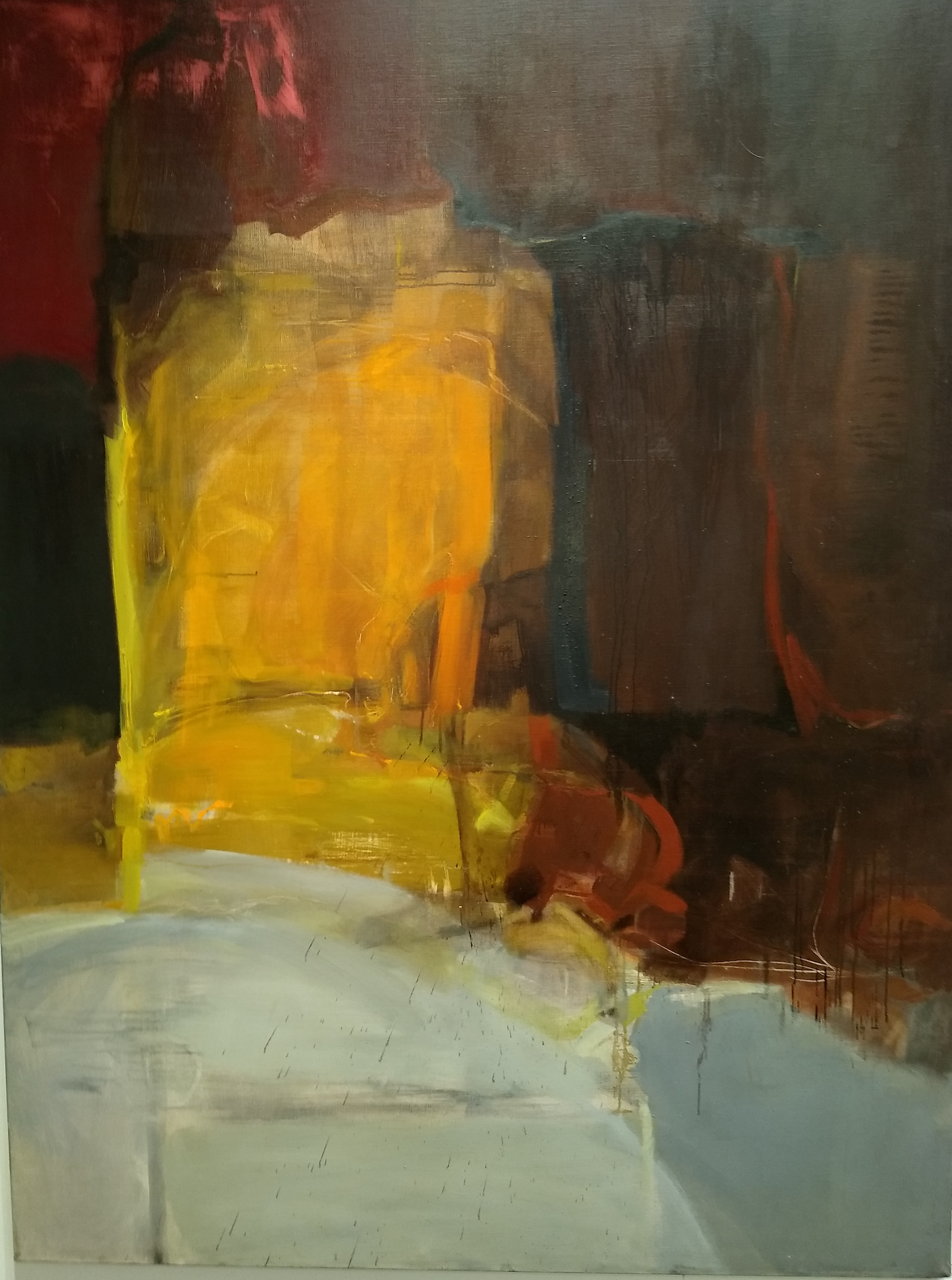
Untitled, oil on canvas, 1960/1963

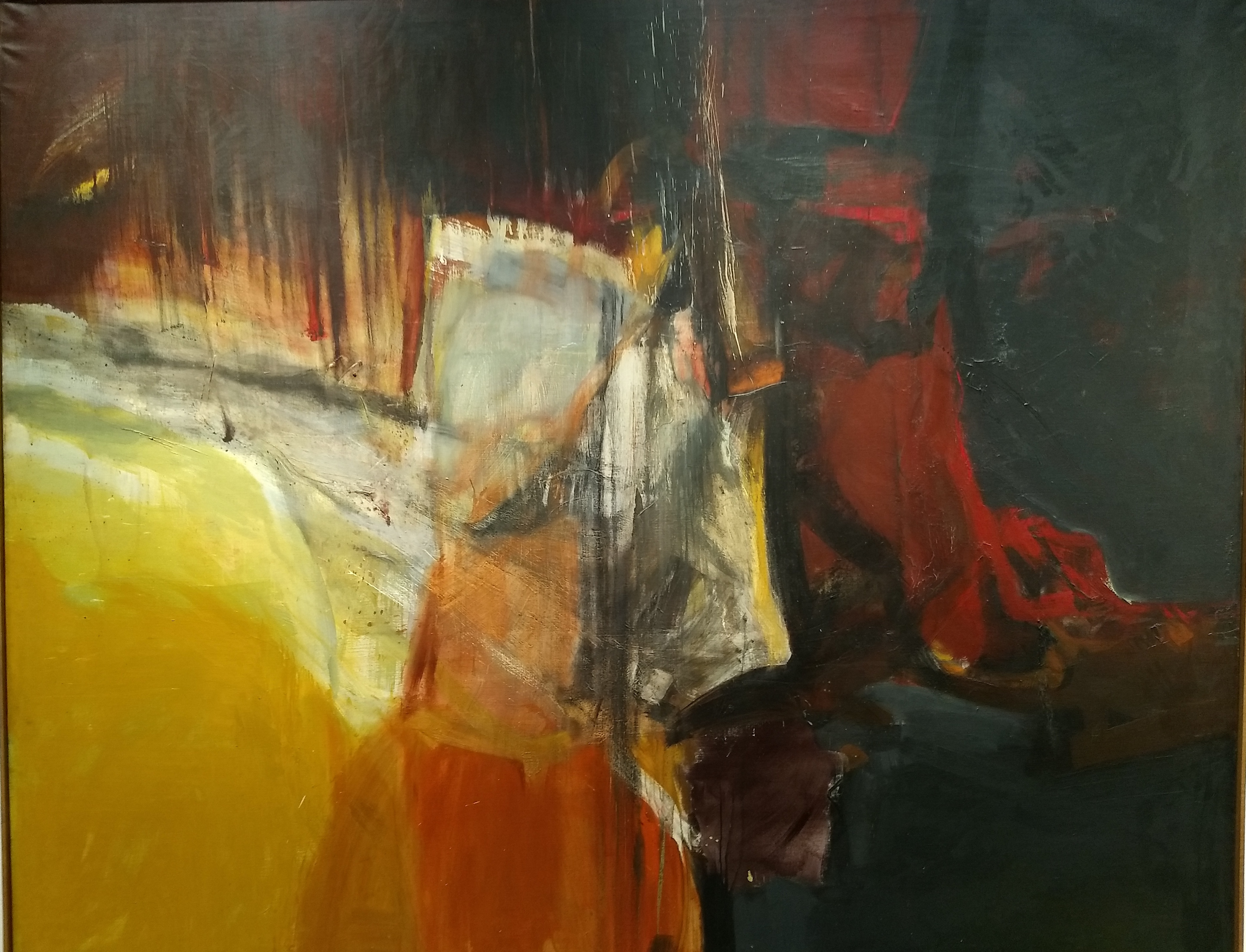
Untitled, oil on canvas

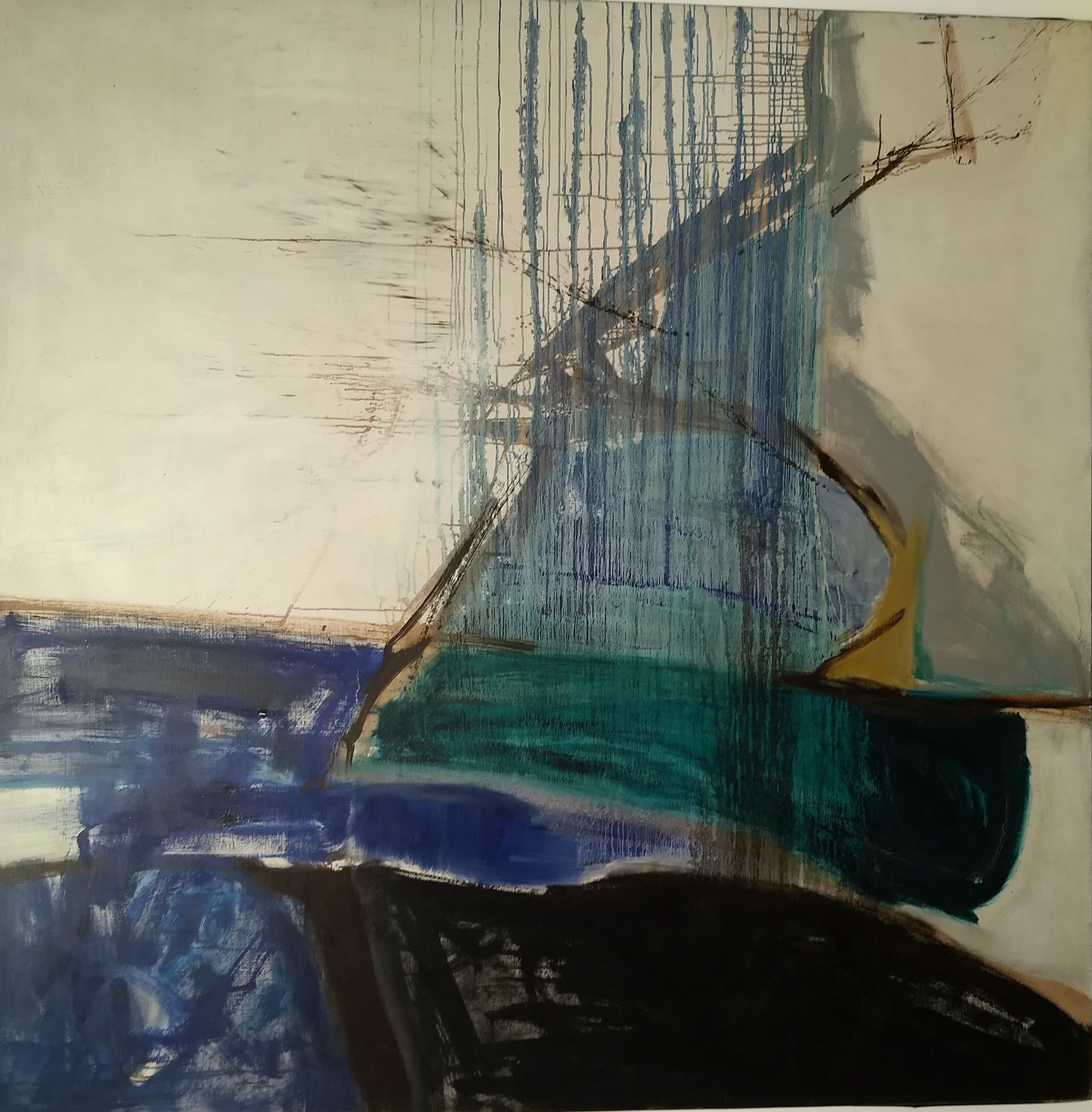
Untitled, 1960/1963

=== Exhibitions ===
- 1960 – Individual exhibition, Galería Peuser
- 1961 – Individual exhibition, Galería Lirolay
- 1961 – Arte Destructivo ("Destructive Art"), Galería Lirolay
- 1962 – Premio Ver y Estimar, honourable mention, Museo Nacional de Bellas Artes, Buenos Aires, Argentina
- 1963 – Premio Ver y Estimar, participant, Museo Nacional de Bellas Artes, Buenos Aires, Argentina
- 1963 – Premio Di Tella (Di Tella award), participant
- 1963 – Arte Argentino Actual ("Contemporary Argentine Art"), Musée d'Art Moderne, Paris, France

==== Posthumous ====
- 1979 – Love Story: Silvia Torras y Kenneth Kemble, Galería Van Riel, Buenos Aires, Argentina
- 2002 – Kemble/Torras, Museo Nacional de Bellas Artes, Buenos Aires, Argentina
- 2018 – Silvia Torras. Resplandor 1960–63, Eduardo Sívori Museum, Buenos Aires, Argentina
- 2021- Silvia Torras. Juventud y Alegría - MCMC Galeria, Buenos Aires, Argentina
- 2022 - Kenneth Kemble and Silvia Torras: The Formative Years, Duke House Exhibition, New York, New York
