= Milagros Correch =

Argentine painter and muralist

Milu Correch
- Born: 1991 (age 34–35); Villa Urquiza, Buenos Aires
- Occupations: Painter and Muralist
- Website: www.milucorrech.com

Milagros Correch (born 1991, Villa Urquiza, Buenos Aires), better known as Milu Correch, is an Argentine painter and muralist recognized internationally for her large scale murals and illustrations. Her work can be found in cities in Argentina and around the world.

== Career ==
=== 2011-2012 ===
Correch began her career as an artist in 2011 painting a street mural in Buenos Aires as she saw her home town getting filled with murals and fell in love with the format. She attended a workshop to learn the basic skills of mural painting led by Emy Mariani and Lean Frizzera, two Argentinian street artists from Buenos Aires. From the beginning, she decided to signe her works with her full name instead of using a pseudonym.

=== 2013 ===
The following year, Correch collaborated in CULM: Construir un Lugar Mejor Sin Destruir Lo que Tenemos (in English: Building a better place without destructing what we have), a project founded by Santiago Gonzales Villagos that aimed to disseminate urban street art by regenerating landscapes and to bring visibility to the town of Quintanar de la Orden in Toledo, Spain. The thematic of the project was Don Quijote de La Mancha as to represent and tribute the identity of the municipality derived from Cervantes' story.

Correch's participation on the project resulted in the immense mural of Dulcinea del Toboso, the character that symbolizes Don Quijote's motive for all his knight-errant adventures. She decided to portray Dulcinea as the main event, supporting Don Quijote and Sancho Panza on one shoulder, and three mills interpreting La Mancha on the other. The production of the mural took six days in August 2013. This was the first big mural painted by Correch and measured approximately 20x15 meters tall. It is also the biggest illustration of Dulcinea in the world.

In September 2013, Correch painted another mural for CULM, this time in El Toboso, a town 7 kilometers away from Quintanar de la Orden, where she had created Dulcinea Sueña la Mancha on the town's water tower.

=== 2014-2016 ===
In 2015, Correch painted the mural Disciples of Peter Pan - superagent children redeeming adults of the absurd, as part of aDNA collective in Rome, Italy. That same year, Correch exhibited original drawings and prints for two days at Bistro in Pigneto, Rome, Italy which was also curated by aDNA Collective. Her work was for sale in order to support her third trip in Europe since she was invited to create murals in various cities of Spain, Germany and Belgium.

In 2016, in addition to painting murals in Buenos Aires, she also painted in Sweden and Italy.

=== 2017 ===
Her mural Oxido in the neighbourhood of Los Alamos, Quilmes, realized for the project Pinta tu barrio, was recognized as one of the seven best murals in the world for the month of November 2017, by Netherlands' Street Art Today. This mural was part of Entre Cenizas (in English: Among ashes) Correch's first exposition.

Correch was invited to participate to CURA - Circuito URbano de Arte in December 2017, to create a large scale mural that would mark the 120th anniversary of the city of Belo Horizonte, Brazil. The mural entitled Ajo y Vino illustrates two masked naked women dancing around bottles of wine, and being surrounded by crows. The background of the artwork was painted by three Brazilian pixadores: DIC, DOXS and PAVOR. The piece is found on the facade of the Garagem Sao Jose, a 28-story building which is now part of one of the tallest murals in Latin America, covering a surface of 1,750 square meters.

Ajo y Vino also marked the first mural of Correch's witches series:

Milu Correch's series on "witches" explores the historical persecution of women in Europe and the Americas. The works focus on themes of autonomy, traditional healing, and spiritual connections to nature, contrasting these figures with traditional societal roles. Correch also examines the portrayal of witches in folklore as independent characters who drive narrative action.

=== 2018 ===
In 2018, she participated in Draw The Line, the International Festival of Graffiti and Street Art in Campobasso, Italy painting a mural in homage to Hecate, Goddess of Witches.

Continuing the witches series, Correch painted two murals at the NuArt Aberdeen Festival in Scotland: Conjuro contra la corona and Después del Aquelarre. Both represent the oppression of women persecuted for witchcraft or sorcery in the late 16th and early 17th century. Correch paints the woman in both murals using dark colours and covering their faces as to create somber hidden subjects that reflect the neglect of women's rights and the dehumanization of witches.

== Artwork ==
=== Murals ===
Her murals are painted with techniques such as layouts, pain rollers, paint brushes, grids and projectors. The themes of her works are mainly focused around mythological and anthropomorphic figures in which classic and ancient Latin American iconographies merge with characters from modern myths.

Date	Title	Event/Organization	Location	References
2019	Furia	North Wells Walls	Werchter, Belgium	
2019	Hypatia	Mujeres de Ciencia of UPV	Valencia, Spain	
2019	Ñatinta19	Perros Sueltos	La Paz, Bolivia	
2019	Brujas del viento	Festival Urbano Curva	Rio Grande, Tierra del fuego, Argentina	
2019	Exilio	Sullair Cultura	Barracas, Buenos Aires, Argentina	
2019	Conjuro contra el amo	Rexenera Fest	Carballo, Spain	
2018	Hecate	Draw The Line	Campobasso, Italy	
2018	Johanne r & Kirti	Nuart	Stavanger, Norway	
2018	Conjuro contra inseguridades	Muro Urbano	Berazategui, Buenos Aires, Argentina	
2018	Conjuro de naranja	Mésquemurs	Puerto Sagunto, Spain	
2018	Conjuro para una estabilidad	Rexenera Fest	Carballo, Spain	
2018	Contra todo privilegio	Poliniza Dos	Valencia, Spain	
2018	Conjuro contra la corona	NuArt Aberdeen	Scotland	
2018	Después del Aquelarre	NuArt Aberdeen	Scotland	
2018	C10	Jidar - Toile de rue	Rabat, Morocco	
2018	Otro	Crystal Ship	Oostende, Belgium	
2017	Ajo y Vino	CURA	Belo Horizonte, Brazil	
2017	Óxido	Pinta tu barrio	Los Alamos, Quilmes, Buenos Aires, Argentina	
2017	Pasillo	In The Wall We Trust	Airola, Italy	
2017	Fiat 126	Incipit Project	Sapri, Italia	
2017	Sobre Peugeot	Festival Miau	Fanzara, Spain	
2017	Chatarra	Calle Libre	Vienna, Austria	
2017	Abrazo	We all Write	Ahtopol, Bulgaria	
2017	Te	Helsinki Urban Art	Helsinki, Finland	
2017	Hecha la ley...	Helsinki Urban Art	Helsinki, Finland	
2017	Cortejo: Interpretation based on Cristina Peri Rossi's poem "Cortejo"	-	Buenos Aires, Argentina	
2017	Trabajos de Costura	Pinta Argentina	Barrio La Habana, Villa Marteli, Buenos Aires, Argentina	
2017	Yeresadé	Pinta Argentina	Los Piletones, Soldati, Buenos Aires, Argentina	
2016	Las flautistas de Lioni	Bagout	Lioni, Italia	
2016	Empoderada y poderosa	-	Nogoya y la via, Buenos Aires, Argentina	
2016	Cuidadora de Cuervos	Casa Dassein	Buenos Aires, Argentina	
2016	Cara de Piedra	Ifo Center	Bromölla, Sweden	
2016	Cría Cuervos	Halmstad Arena	Halmstad, Sweden	
2016	Mascaras	-	Nassjö, Sweden	
2016	Nudo	Bonito Contest Art (Impronte 2016)	Bonito, Italy	
2016	BOMBO	-	Tronador y Nahuel Huapi, Villa Urquiza, Buenos Aires	
2015	Kosmo - Utopia	KAT (Created with Mariela Ajras)	Louvain La-neuve, Belgium	
2015	Paraguas	-	Caldas y Chorrarin, Buenos Aires, Argentina	
2015	Libro	Pinto La Isla	Isla Maciel, Avellaneda, Buenos Aires, Argentina	
2015	Arbol	Incipit Project	Sapri, Italy	
2015	Alicia Duerme	Mechelen Muurt	Belgium	
2015	Aunque vengan los lobos	Memorie Urbane	Arce, Italy	
2015	Máscara	(Created with Pablo Herrero)	Salamanca, Spain	
2015	Yoshimoto	-	Girona, Spain	
2015	Discípulos de Peter Pan	aDNA Collective	Rome, Italy	
2015	Ninfa	Street Alps	Torre Pellice, Italy	
2014	Jugetero or Geppetto	Galería Urbana de Salamanca	Salamanca, Spain	
2014	El lobo no está	-	Besares, Buenos Aires, Argentina	
2014	Literatura	Muropolis	Mendoza, Argentina	
2014	Cuervo	Street Art Today	Amsterdam, Netherlands	
2014	Marionetas	IBUG (Created with Diego Cirulli)	Zwickau, Germany	
2014	Reina y Hermanas	-	Buenos Aires, Argentina	
2013	Dulcinea Sueña la Mancha	CULM: Construir un Lugar Mejor Sin Destruir Lo que Tenemos	El Toboso, Toledo, Spain	
2013	Dulcinea del Toboso	CULM: Construir un Lugar Mejor Sin Destruir Lo que Tenemos	Quintanar de la Orden, Toledo, Spain	
