= Laura Messing =

Argentine Architect, Visual Artist and Professor

- Born: 1953 (age 72–73); Buenos Aires
- Education: Architect
- Alma mater: Universidad de Buenos Aires
- Website: lauramessing.com

Laura Messing (born 1953 in Buenos Aires) is an Argentine visual artist who lives and works in Buenos Aires.

== Life and career ==
Laura Messing received her degree in Architecture from the University of Buenos Aires in 1978. She began her career as an artist in the 80's focusing in photography and painting. She has received numerous awards including the Premio Leonardo en Fotografía Museo Nacional de Bellas Artes in 2002, the Gran premio de Honor in Ceramics in 1989 and the Grant of Secretaría de Cultura de la Nación in 1985. She published the books 'La Construcción del Espacio' and 'El Libro de los Bosques' comprising her photographic oeuvre in collaboration with renowned art critics Julio Sanchez Valeria Gonzalez.

Messing has exhibited internationally including the Havana Biennial, Panama Biennial and Lima Photography Biennial, among others. and took part of About Change: In Latin America and the Caribbean, curated by The World Bank Art Program and the Art Museum of the Americas. As a director of Isidro Miranda, she was the organizer of the prestigious Platt Award for the Arts supporting young artists from Latin America and the founder of the Escuela de Proyectos where she led numerous workshops.

== Artistic work ==
Her recent production focuses in Biomaterials and the relationship between humans and nature. As an artist she often collaborates with designers, scientists, tech-companies, and other professionals in the development of sustainable artistic and textile materials.

For Messing, producing an artwork is directly related with the process and experiences that trigger human experiences and their relation with nature and the environment surrounding them. The artist’s ongoing exploration of interwoven themes such as environmental justice, climate change and the cultural processes are the core of her practice.

She is the founder of Moebio, an innovative bioleather project based on plant and bacterial cellulose from kombucha drink, and has collaborated as a visual artist in the production of sustainable materials that are vegan, plant-based and biodegradable to produce artworks without harming the environment.
