= Sant Cugat =

Sant Cugat is Catalan for Saint Cucuphas and may refer to:

- Sant Cugat del Vallès, Spain
  - Sant Cugat Museum
  - Sant Cugat (Barcelona–Vallès Line), a railway station
- Sant Cugat Sesgarrigues, Spain
