= Ana Sacerdote =

Italian-born Argentine abstract artist (1925–2019)

- Born: 25 September 1925; Rome, Italy
- Died: 2019 (aged 93–94)
- Education: Escuela Nacional de Bellas Artes Prilidiano Pueyrredon
- Known for: Painting; Video art Computer art
- Website: anasacerdote.com

Ana Sacerdote (25 September 1925 – 2019) was an Italian-born Argentine abstract artist who lived in Buenos Aires.

Sacerdote was born in Rome, Italy on 25 September 1925. She graduated from the Escuela Nacional de Bellas Artes Prilidiano Pueyrredon in Buenos Aires and studied under Lino Enea Spilimbergo. In the mid-1950s, she exhibited with Carmelo Arden Quin, Martin Blaszko, Gregorio Vardanega, Virgilio Villalba, Luis Tomasello, and others in the Asociacion Arte Nuevo in Buenos Aires, which was organized by Aldo Pellegrini. In 1956, with recommendations from Jorge Romero Brest and Pablo Curatella Manes, Sacerdote was awarded a grant by the French government to live and study in Paris. She continued painting throughout the 1960s, when she became interested in video art and later computer-generated drawings. She created an animated film based on her geometric paintings that was shown at the I Festival Internacional do Cinema de Animação no Brasil VIII Bienal de São Paulo in São Paulo, Brazil in 1965. Beginning in the 1970s, she experimented with computer-generated drawings and continued to create video art. Sacerdote died in 2019.

== Publications ==
- "Acerca de un hipotético tratado de armonía de la pintura". Boletin Arte Nuevo (1). Buenos Aires. 1956.
- Guthmann, Ana Sacerdote de (1972). "Kinetic Art: Animation of Color for Cinema Film". Leonardo. 5 (3). Oxford, New York: Pergamon Press: 239–241. doi:10.2307/1572383. JSTOR 1572383.
- De Guthmann, Ana Sacerdote (1979). "A Study of the Variations of Types of Computer Drawings Obtainable by Small Program Changes". Leonardo. 12 (1). Oxford, New York: Pergamon Press: 37–40. doi:10.2307/1574082. ISSN 0024-094X. JSTOR 1574082.
- Notas para una programación creativa con graficador editor. Buenos Aires: Manrique Zago. 1989.
