= Mirta Toledo =

Argentine artist, sculptor (born 1952)

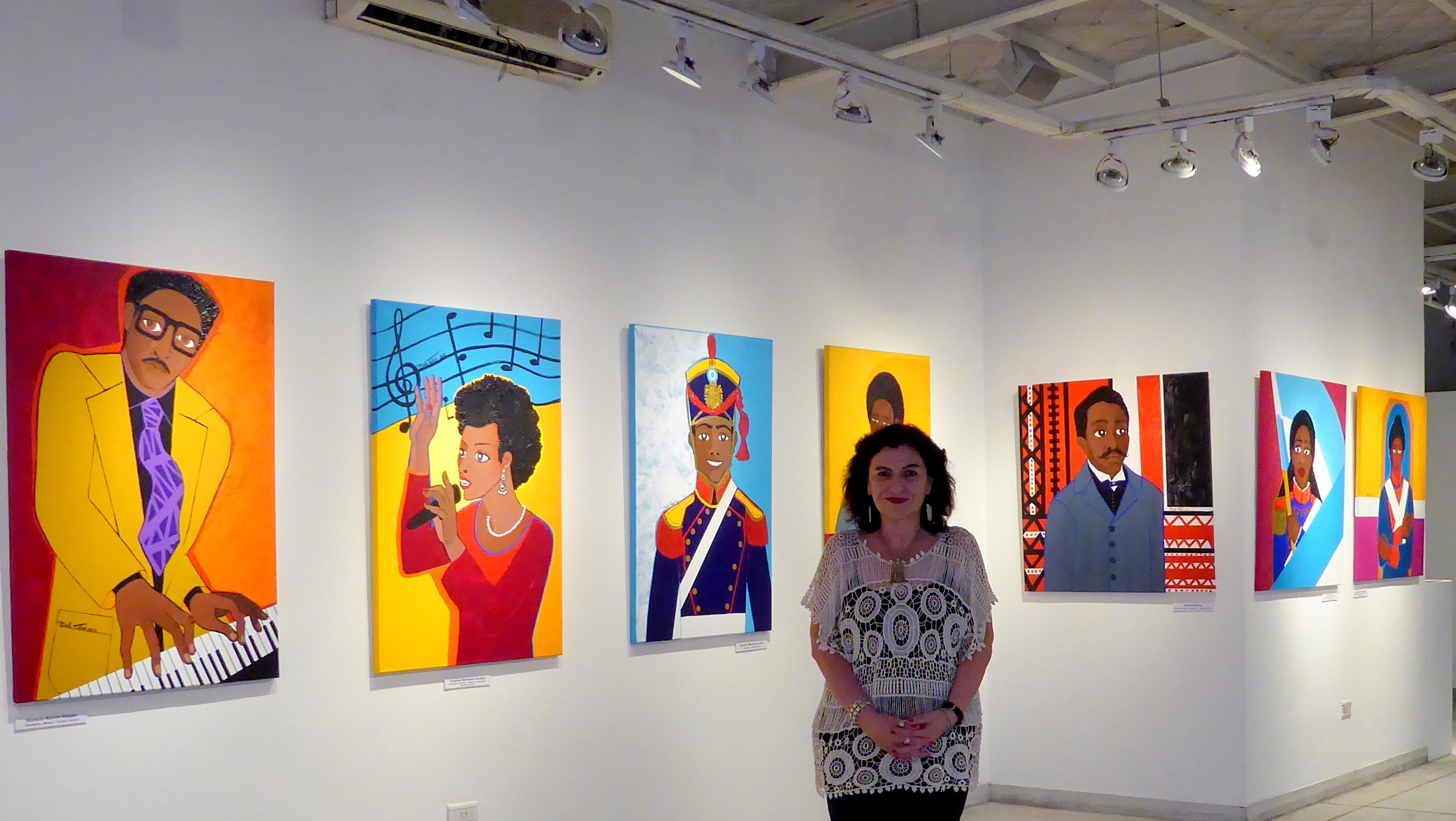
- Born: 25 December 1952 (age 73); Buenos Aires, Argentina
- Education: Escuela Superior de Bellas Artes Ernesto de la Cárcova (1985); Escuela Nacional de Bellas Artes Prilidiano Pueyrredón (1977); Escuela Nacional de Bellas Artes Manuel Belgrano (1973)
- Alma mater: UNA National Art University (2007–2011)
- Known for: The celebration of cultural, religious, racial and sexual diversity through her artwork, proposing to the viewer an alternative vision to the Eurocentric.
- Awards: Estrella Award for Outstanding Woman in the Arts 1997 by the Hispanic Women's Network of Texas

Mirta Toledo (born 1952) is an Argentine artist and writer. As a painter, printmaker, sculptor, novelist, and short story author, Toledo's work highlights racial, cultural, and sexual diversity.

== Early life ==
Mirta Toledo was born in the Almagro neighborhood of Buenos Aires. Her father, Toribio Toledo, was Afro-Guarani, while her mother, Eva García Román, was Spanish. Growing up in this ethnically diverse family provided early influence for the themes explored in her work. Toledo further cites her father as the driving force in her art, for having "instilled in her qualities of strength, ambition and values, normally reserved for men in her society."

== Education ==
Toledo obtained an MFA in Visual Arts with a Major in Painting from the National University of the Arts in 2011. In 1985, she completed a residency with master sculptor Antonio Pujía in the National College of Fine Arts Ernesto de la Cárcova. She earned a degree as a Professor of Painting (1974) and Professor of Sculpture (1982) from the National School of Fine Arts Prilidiano Pueyrredón, and a bachelor's degree in fine arts (Drawing) from the School of Fine Arts Manuel Belgrano (1973).

Toledo completed two residencies specializing in hand-made fine art serigraphy at Coronado Studio in Austin, Texas: Serie Project V (1998) and Serie Project IX (2002). She was also an artist in residence at Stone Metal Press in San Antonio, Texas (2002). Toledo was a Class of 2002 Alumni of the NALAC Leadership Institute of the National Association of Latino Arts and Cultures.

== Artistic life ==
=== Sculpture and pottery: 1977–93 ===
In the late 1970s she focused on sculpture, winning her first awards in that medium from the SAAP (Argentine Society of Visual Artists), the Ministry of Culture of Argentina, and the Dirección General de Educación Artística (1979). Her father transmitted to her legends and beliefs of his culture, and it was he who awakened her love for art. Her themes and inspiration are often similar. The sculptures have indigenous faces, they are people who affirm her past, and they are the characters of hundreds of stories that he told her as a child. Her works affirm her ethnicity.

In 1980 Toledo traveled to the United States for the first time. In 1982 she had her first Solo Show On Angels, Women and Machines at the North Star Gallery of the University of Minnesota in Saint Paul. With those works "she tried to express the transformations our world is passing through in three aspects of our everyday life experience: Religious, Humane and Technological and representing these aspects are the angels, women and machines". In 1982 she returned to Argentina, and continued working in sculpture, participating in numerous competitions and achieving awards.

Toledo moved back to the United States to Honolulu, Hawaii in 1988 where she joined the Hawaii Potters' Guild working on both figurative sculpture and vessel-oriented raku pottery, the latter embellished with designs inspired by the indigenous people of her homeland. Before leaving Hawaii in 2002, she had a Solo Show From the Earth at Backus Gallery of Fine Arts. Toledo said she exhibited: "pottery and figurative sculptures that allows her more range in developing metaphorical potential. Busts of Pachamama, Coquena, Anahí, Sisa-Huinaj are appealing personifications of deities linked to various aspects of Earth's rhythms." Once established in Fort Worth, she continued working in pottery and sculpture for three more years, until she decided to devote herself entirely to painting.

=== "Pure Diversity": 1990–present ===
This series of paintings draws from her belief that cultural differences are the "treasure of humanity". Pure diversity reflects the focus of the artist and shows her awareness of the ethnic, cultural and individual diversity within society and her own experience and heritage. She said about modernity and culture: "Every society has its own characteristics, values and culture, but I feel that after the twentieth century, with mass media invading our homes, the whole world has been exposed to "universal" values that we are learning and adopting not only as the truth, but also, as our own. There is not such a thing as "universal beauty" These works envision a society that is equal: "People tell me that I am an idealist, that I dream and I have hopes for a better society. I always said that it is my answer to the vision of a submissive Latin America and the assurance of seeing a diverse evolving world without racism".

She approached different themes to celebrate the difference among the world's societies. Diversity in Religion (portraying gods and goddess from prehispanic Latin America, Caribbean, Africa and European saints). Pure Diversity: Children and Dolls (portraying the ethnic and cultural differences between children´s and their reflection on the dolls created in their own society) and Pure Diversity: Flowers, Women and Birds (portraying women from all over, symbolically using birds and flowers to give hidden messages about themselves). Petro Russo said about her in trends contemporary artists: "Toledo´s works attest to her identity and the identity of all those fragmented between two cultures, who have had to reconfigure their history on ongoing basis in order to incorporate new voices, while maintaining old voices, so that they do not forget the origin of their trip."

This series was displayed in solo shows at Texas Christian University and Texas Women's University. She gave conferences on her theme at several universities including Barnard College in New York (1995), the University of North Carolina at Chapel Hill (1996), the University of Maryland at College Park (1995), TCU (1998) and Southwest Texas State University (2001). In such conferences she said: "diversity is a global phenomenon and the only hope and reality for the future".

An edition of ARRIBA, Art & Business News said about her: "Traveling through the paintings of Mirta Toledo is to enter into the celebration of diversity. As if it were a huge hug to a diversity present full of beauty, she is moving away from those fears and rejection that causes all the unknown, even if it is close to us. She is oblivious to the theories of racial purity, she questions the idea of "pure" as opposed to the "different".

In 1997 she was awarded the Estrella Award for Outstanding Hispanic Woman in the Arts, by the Hispanic Women's Network of Texas.

In 2002 she had a Solo Show with Pure Diversity: Children and Dolls at DiverseArts Little Gallery in Austin, Texas. Toledo believes that there's only one race, The Human Race. She also thinks that accepting that there is only one race must result in accepting that the human race is pure diversity. She considered how multicultural her doll collection had become and how dolls were a common element in all societies, past and present. Pondering the whole idea gave birth to her signature theme, people and diversity, and to this series, children and dolls. "I try to show that there is hope and beauty," she remarks. "We have to embrace ourselves as a human race, accept the way we are, and we are diverse." Since then, that theme has been the topic of Toledo's short stories and conferences, and it represents the intellectual level of her paintings during the past 14 years. Her dolls have assumed the role of ambassadors of diversity. Her art is on permanent display at Mi Casa Gallery, located in Austin's famous South Congress Cultural District.

=== "Track of Feelings": 1994–present ===
Reacting to the California Proposition 187, in 1994 Toledo created a mixed media triptych of big dimensions: "The Key Word is LOVE " (1994). The three canvasses presented glued and hand sewn collages of her drawings about Aztec, Mayan and African significant art, and the portrait of family members. The work also included empty panels where immigrants were invited to write about their feelings and experiences in the United States. This piece marked the beginning of the series Track of Feelings. In these works, she not only changes her approach to expressing the world's daily historical events, but also alters her technique.

John Singlethon would say about this series in ARRIBA, Art & Business News: "Track The Colors in the paintings do not blend, but bleed. There is orange and there is blue and the ugly compromises we must make, the shades of meaning where people equivocate and bury the past, these things are not there. The moldy blending of hue is traded for sharp contrast, clarity, the exact point where night and day play shell games is now captured, again, in a reflection of what has collected in the brushes of Mirta Toledo.

"No Outlet" (1997) is the footprint of the torture exerted by the military during Argentina's Dirty War.

Judith Torrea claimed in ARRIBA, Art & Business News that: "Silhouettes of men and women who once were alive but had no outlet. To the left of the canvas is glued a newspaper article where a woman related how she was tortured while a priest near her was praying. The red acrylic stroke left by the glued brush symbolizes the blood leaving and covering an Argentine ID ... and that human being disappears completely ... not even the person's name exists anymore. In a corner of the canvas a phrase reads: "I was full of life." A shape. A shadow. The weight of memory."

Also from 1997 is "Justice and Memory" referring to the AMIA bombings. This work shows colorful bodies silhouettes of men, women and children of all sizes and colors (made with the Mexican hand cut paper technique) glued to the canvas on a blood red background. There is also a color blue sky section, where a photograph of a black wall shows in white letters a claim: Justice and Memory, along with the list of victims of the attack. As falling from the black wall there are three signs of "Fragile" and, again, the black wall with white lettering claiming "Justice and Memory", and, below, a request: "Neither hypocrisy, nor complicity!"

Toledo´s most complicated art adheres fabric, paper, stamps, news prints and the tools of artistic trade to multilevel paintings that contain references to social or political conditions. In "Lost Mail" (2000) she incorporates printings of her sister Claudia´s poem "Is Scary to Return" with postmarked mailings, framed in black, then blue, then brilliant orange. This series of artworks was first exhibited in the year 2000 at LanPeña Gallery in Austin, Texas. Many of the mixed media pieces were looking back from Argentina to Texas, with a developed visual vocabulary meriting a full "Retrospectiva". At the time of her Solo Show, Argentine filmmaker Jorge Coscia was visiting the US and did a documentary on Toledo's artwork: Lecciones de Vida: El arte de Mirta Toledo (October 2000).

=== Mail Art: 2007–present ===
After moving to Buenos Aires, Toledo began to work immediately in mail art, a genre of art centered around sending small-scale artworks through the mail service.

Her first participation was in October 2007 in the call: TeeToTuM 1st. International Art Exhibition "The Philosophy Day". Her painting Tatina Cori was exhibited in the Art Space Vlassis, in Thessaloniki, Greece. Continuing with her diversity theme, she sent two portraits to the Zadarama 2008 call: Cutzalán Woman and African American Teenager. Those were exhibited at Ceske Budejovice International Art Festival in Zadar, Croatia.

In the same line of her paintings and drawings about the women murdered with impunity in Juarez, Toledo answered a call about the "Elimination of Violence Against Women" participating with four artworks: I hit you because I love you, say the abusers, Elimination of Violence Against Women's Stamps, Mother of Juarez Limited Edition Stamp Collection and a Stop Violence Envelope. The exhibition took place at the Technological Educational Institute of Central Macedonia in November 2008. Her paintings investigate the enigma of the self, propose possible worlds, and question the complex situation of women in today's world. How do women see themselves? And how do others view them from childhood? Thus, a range of women seem to look back at the spectators asking, "What do you see when you look at us?" Toledo has participated with her Mail Art in Australia, Brazil, Belgium, Bangladesh, Canada, Colombia, Chile, Finland, Hawaii, Indonesia, Italy, Japan, Malaysia, Portugal, Spain, Ukraine and the United States.

In May 2008, Raices Culturales Latinoamericanas (in Philadelphia, Pennsylvania) invited Toledo to have a Solo Show. With the body of artwork that she called ...with the letter M, she conveys her message of the 90's: Art is a magical tool that I use ... We, humans, do not see what is beyond the simple things, not with a pure look. What I see beyond these beliefs full of prejudice are my motivation... And the message of my work is fighting for the tolerance of diversity. The same year, during the months of September and October, the LatinArt Gallery of Philadelphia (now closed) inaugurated its art rooms with a solo exhibition of Mirta Toledo, displaying a retrospective of her work, which includes paintings, sculptures and mixed media.

In 2011 her print The tree of life: portrait of my parents was featured in Arte Tejano: de campos, barrios y fronteras an exhibit at OSDE Espacio de Arte (sponsored by the U.S. Embassy in Argentina together with The Smithsonian Latino Center and Fundación OSDE). This exhibition was curated by Cesáreo Moreno.

=== Invisible Argentine Heroes of African Descendants: 2012– present ===
True to her celebration of diversity, Toledo painted a series of portraits of Argentine of African descendants who, even though contributed in many fields to the making of the nation, were invisible by the Argentina history. Sponsored by IARPIDI, this set of portraits of over twenty African descendants Argentinian Heroes are part of a traveling exhibition that began in the Golden Hall of the House of Culture (2013) and has exhibited in five Districts of Buenos Aires City ever since (2014). This art presentation also crossed the borders of the Federal Capital of Argentina to show in the Art Gallery of the Honorable Council of San Isidro. Dr. Carlos Castellano, (President of the HCSI) expressed his view: "To tell you the truth, is a beautiful project that shows the African roots in Argentina, part of a story that unfortunately has been lost for many reasons. Argentina's history itself has a lot to do with it: the many wars for our independence and wars against adjacent countries which are like brothers, like Paraguay. On those wars many African descendants lost their lives. But besides, this is also great because show us portraits of artists as Salgán, and heroes as Rivadavia. Essentially this exhibit seeks to work in this so important for democracy that is the process of cultural integration."

== Writing ==
Mirta Toledo started to send her manuscripts to literary magazines in 1990, while living in Fort Worth, Texas. Even though she always has focused on her career as a visual artist, never stop writing and publishing. Her first book is a novel, La Semilla Elemental (1993). In this book Toledo addresses issues of continued relevance, related to the search for identity and lost blood line of ancestors. The characters are experiencing the anguish and agony of a painful transplant, and they hear the urgent call of the ancestral voice, the impulse to shake the dust of the generations that hides their true Hispanic / Latin American root. Every story present here speaks about two cultures colliding, found with one goal: domination. The arrival of the conqueror, powers, rights, relations with the inhabitants of the New World, mutual respect, ignorance, neglect, disaster, are some of the peaks on these stories. It is largely a work of denunciation. With the perspective that only the distance can provide, the author makes a deep look into her national and personal wealth: miscegenation. Spanish blood mixed with Guarani Indians and Blacks, the "new mud" in which the protagonist of the epilogue (written, unlike the entire novel, in first person) discover "the elementary seed."

Her short story Jacinto (about the forced disappearance) was chosen to be a part of the Historia de Mujeres, I Antología (1994).

Eleven of her short stories (previously published in literary magazines of Canada, the United States, Brazil and Argentina) came together in the book Dulce de Leche (1996). The introit of Dulce de Leche is a clear warning to the reader, in which a painful awareness slips into a cultural crossroads: "The letters that fail to arrive are because they do not write, because for my family and friends, I'm just an absence, a memory that does not belong to Buenos Aires anymore ..." The pain of being uprooted is a preliminary catharsis for Mirta Toledo, an Argentine narrator who exists "in between" her current life in Texas and her own memories. More precisely, these memories are the treasure of her writing, driven by a compelling poetic imagination. In 1996 A Century After, one of her short stories, was a finalist for the VIII Award Ana María Matute.

In her stories, most of the characters are marginal, like Juancito, a boy from a slum ("Magic Slips"); or Griselda, living between marginalization and the look of a compassionate eye ("The Hunchback"); or the child who writes with his left hand and traumatizes his father who considered that hand "evil" ("The Left Hand"). However, the story that has been published the most times in different countries (Argentina, Canada, the United States, and Spain) is In Between. Written in Spanish (but with its original title in English), it has been a part of every edition of the Spanish instructor's manual ¡A que sí! since 1999. In Between was also translated into English, and together with The Hunchback is part of the book Cruel Fictions, Cruel Realities, Short Stories by Latinamerican Women Writers, edited and translated by Kathy Leonard (1997).

Chamamé in the air (the only story for children that she has written so far) was published in 2006 in Saltimbanqui3 El libro de los sueños in Buenos Aires, Argentina. As she has done it with Mail Art, Toledo responded to the Second International Call Women Cry, in tribute to women and against violence. Nearly six hundred Spanish-speaking women poets from more than twenty countries submitted their poems for the Second Call for International Women Poets in honor of the International Poetry Festival of Women Cry, organized worldwide by the Women Poets International Movement (MPI), Inc. Some three hundred voices were selected, Mirta Toledo, with her poem "...with the letter M" was one of them. This call was developed in conjunction with the Library of Great Nations run by Xabier Susperregi Gutiérrez and Women Poets International. The two organizations together edited the book Ecos del grito – Volume I.

== Personal life ==
In January 1977 Toledo married Dr. Mauricio R. Papini in Buenos Aires, Argentina. From 1980 to 1982, they stayed in the United States in Minneapolis, Minnesota, where their sons were born (1981). They returned to Buenos Aires from 1982–1988, moved to Honolulu from 1988–1990, and then to Fort Worth, Texas from 1990–2000. In 2000, she moved to Austin, Texas, where she continued working on her artwork and had solo shows. In 2007, Toledo returned to Buenos Aires where she currently resides and works.

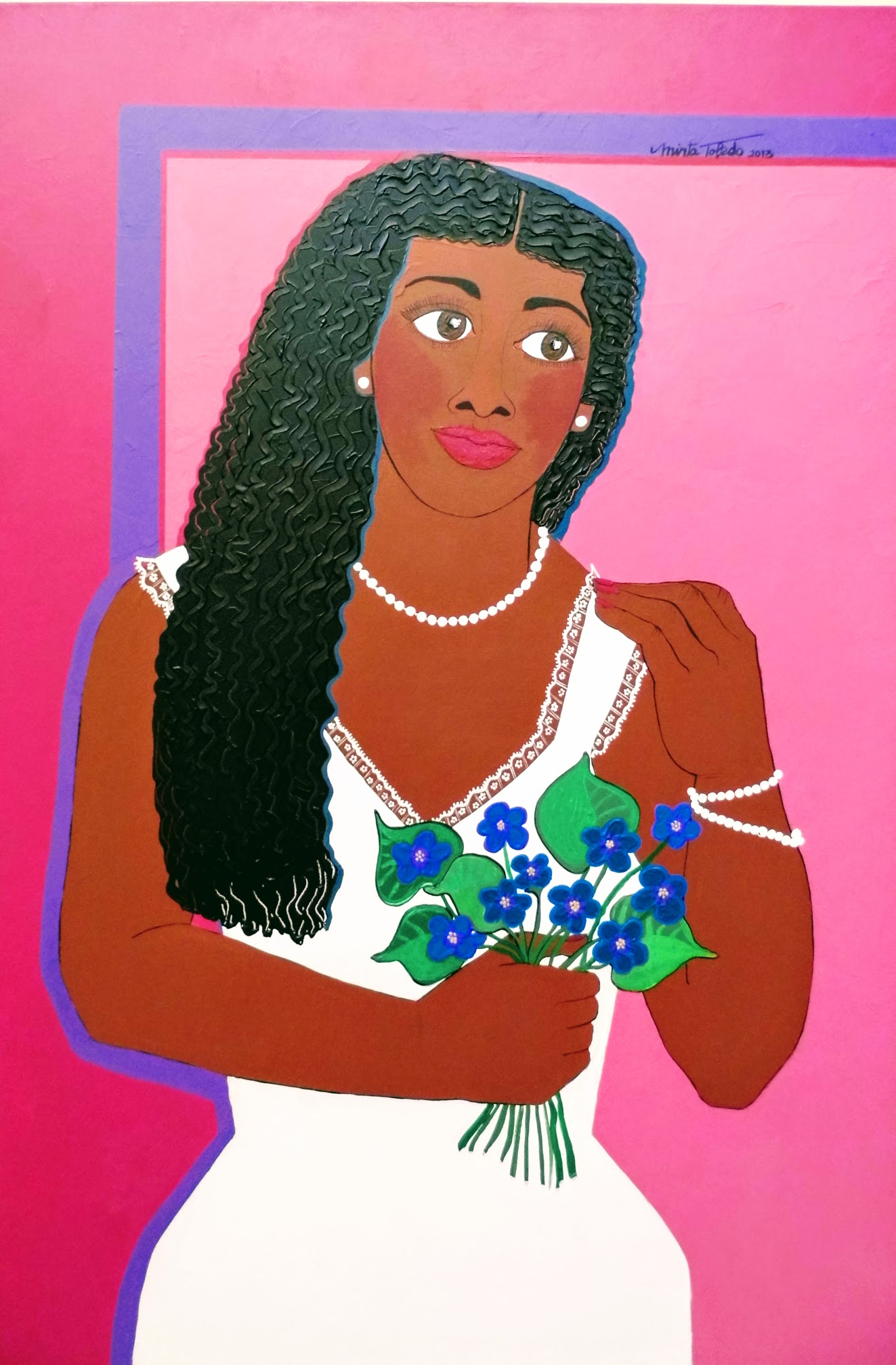

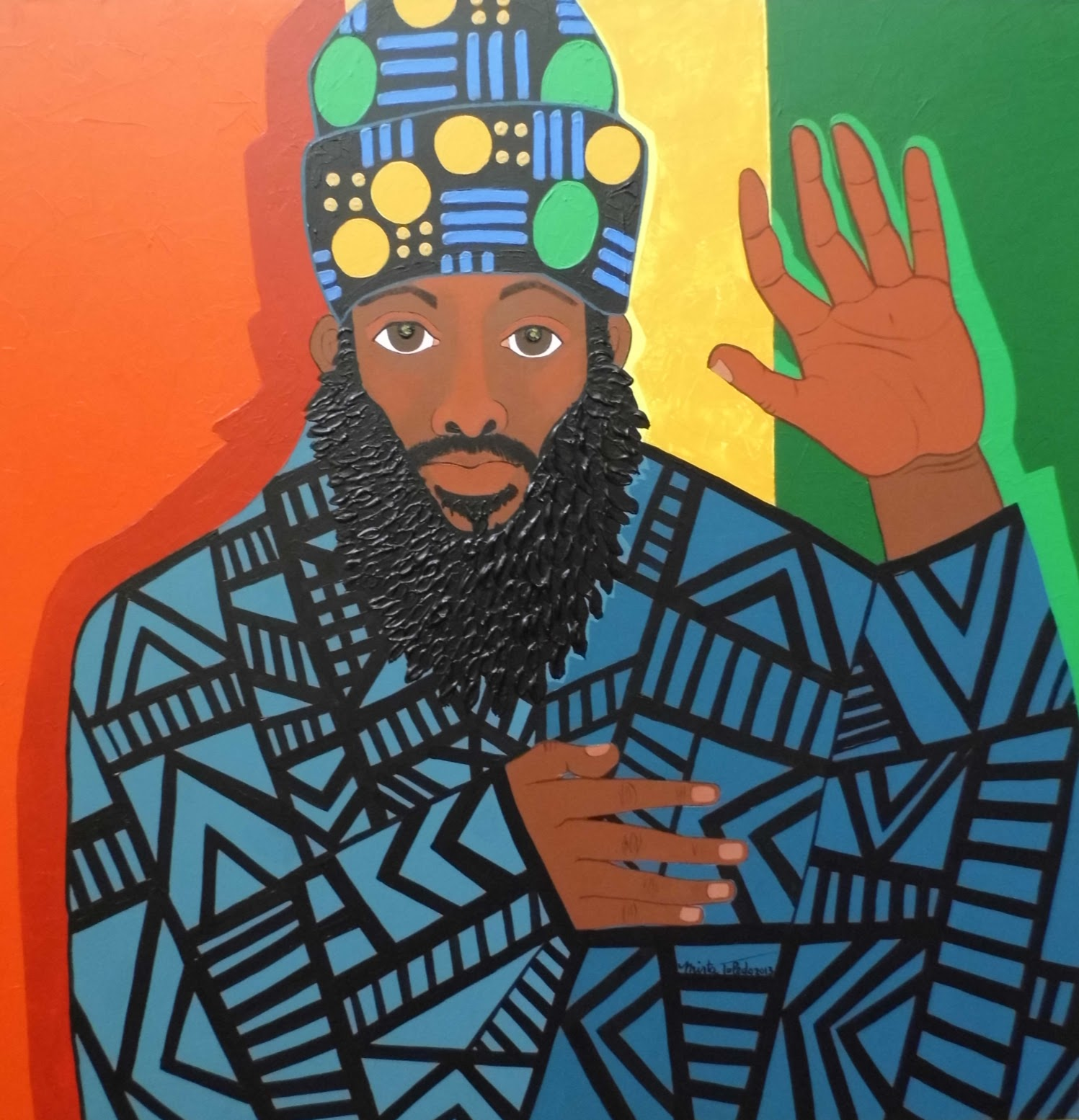

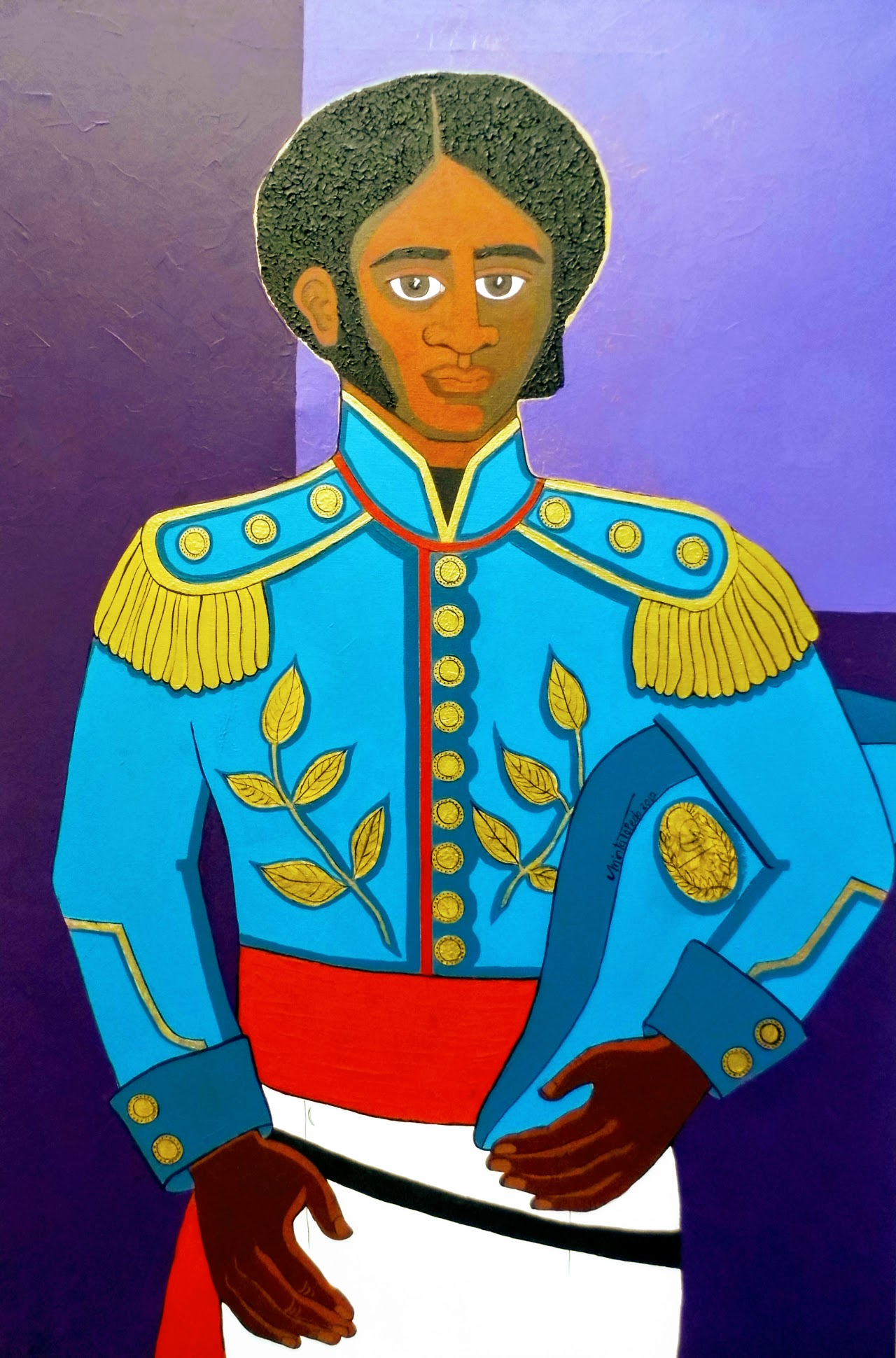

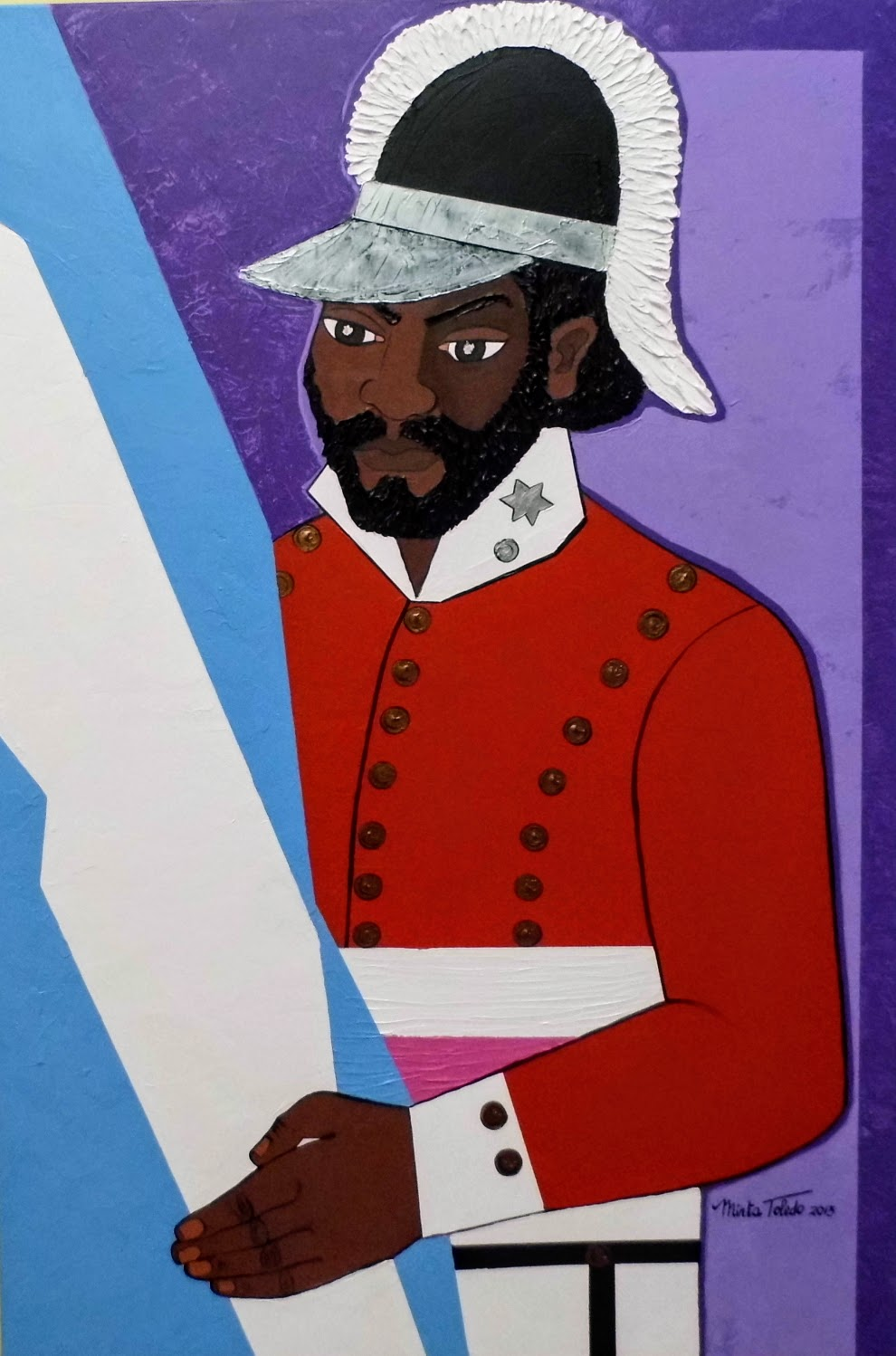

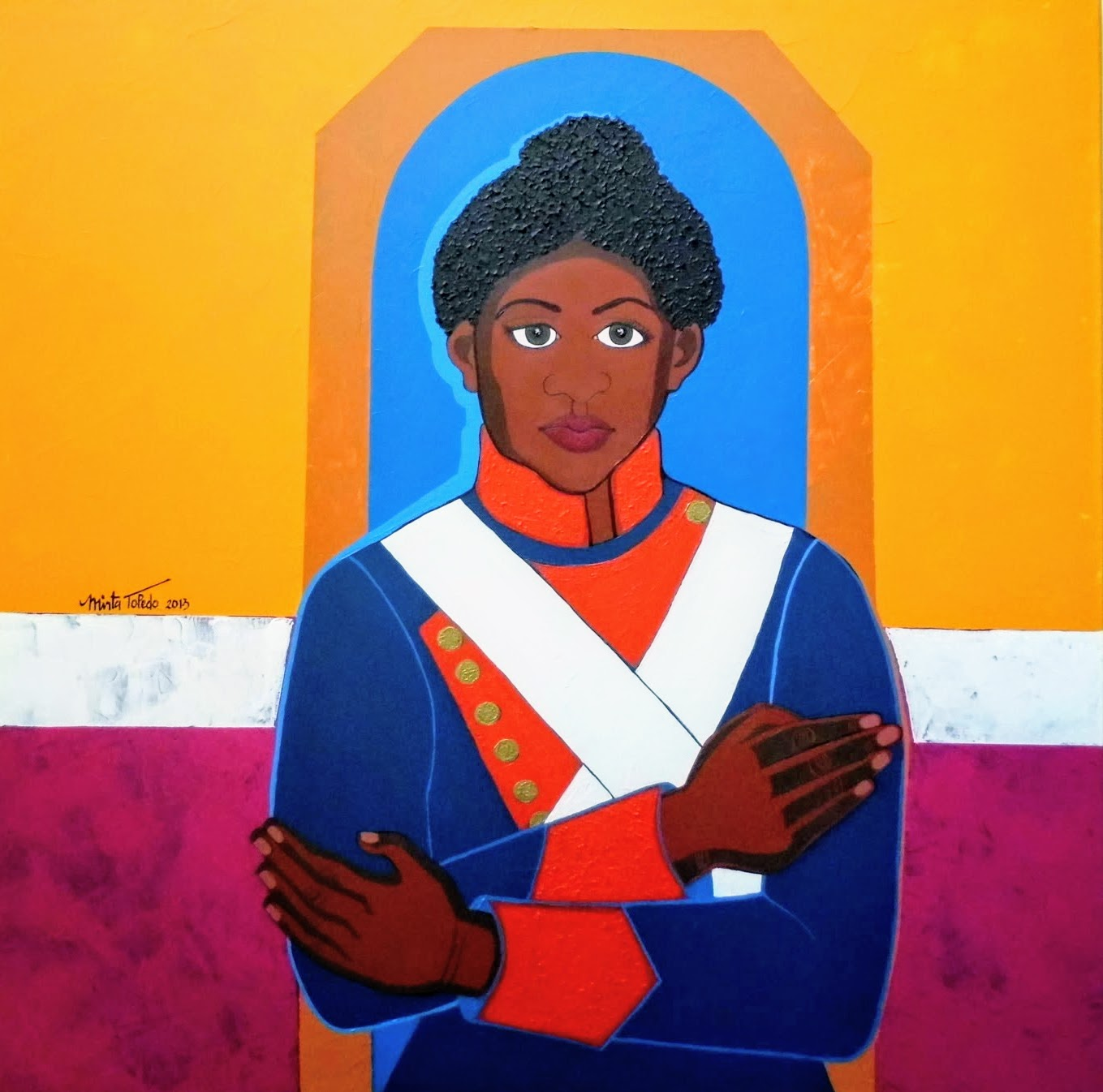

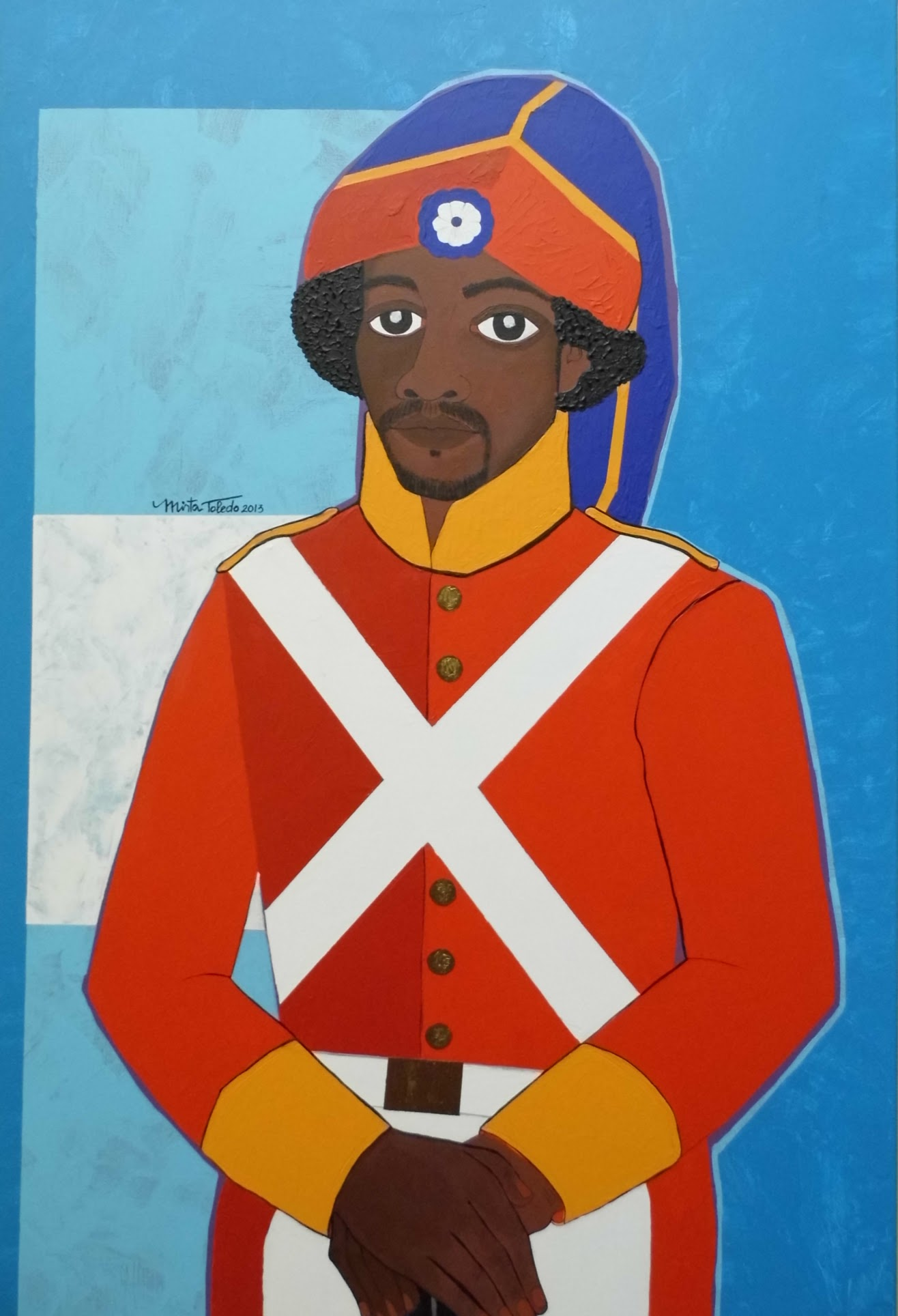

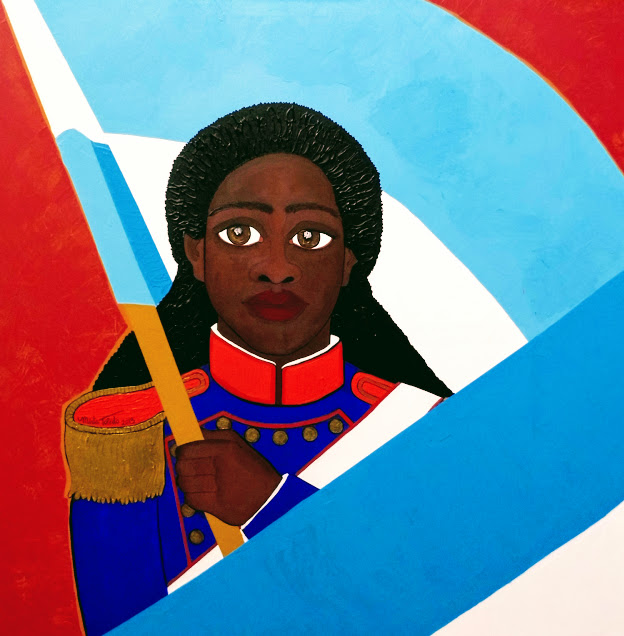

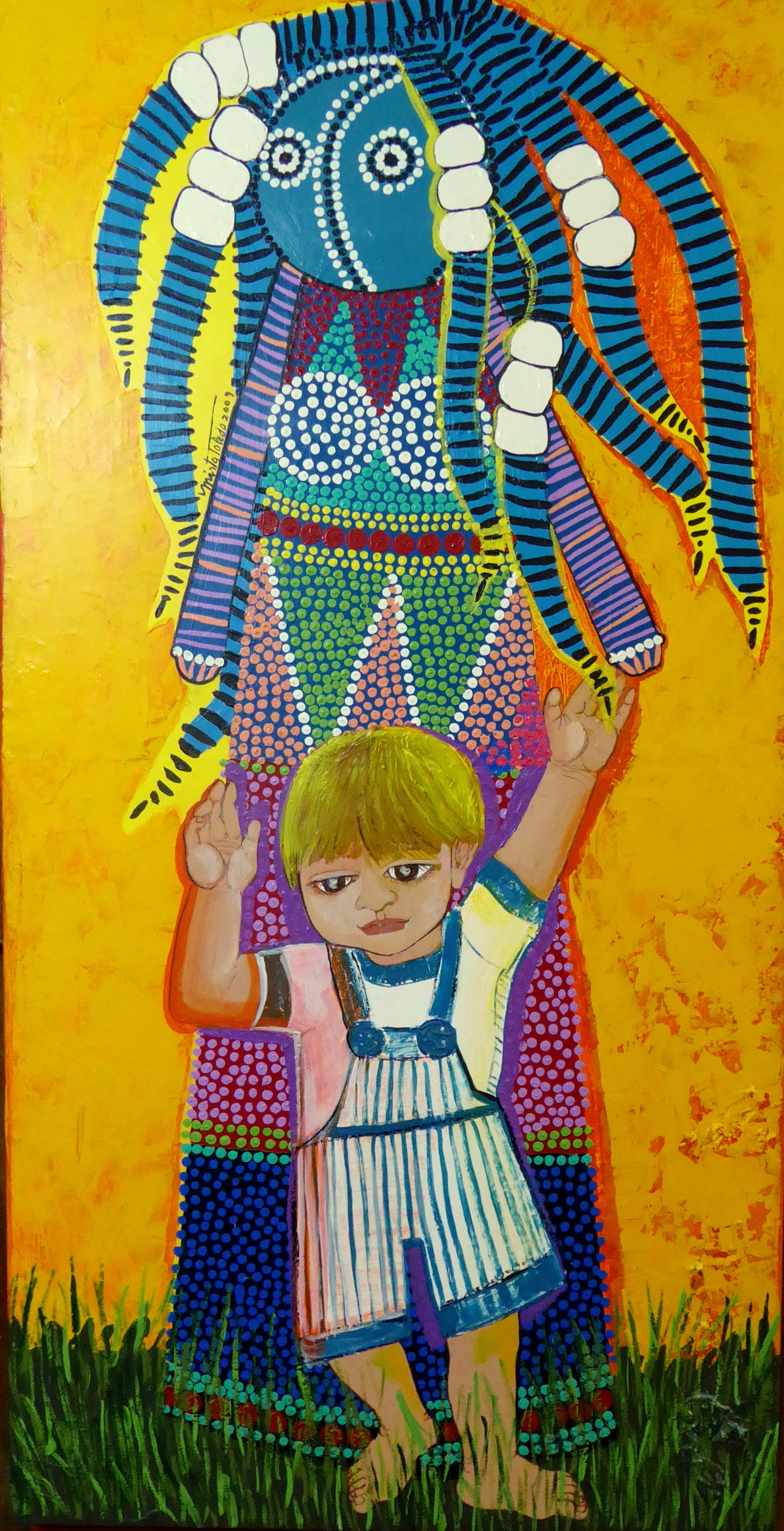

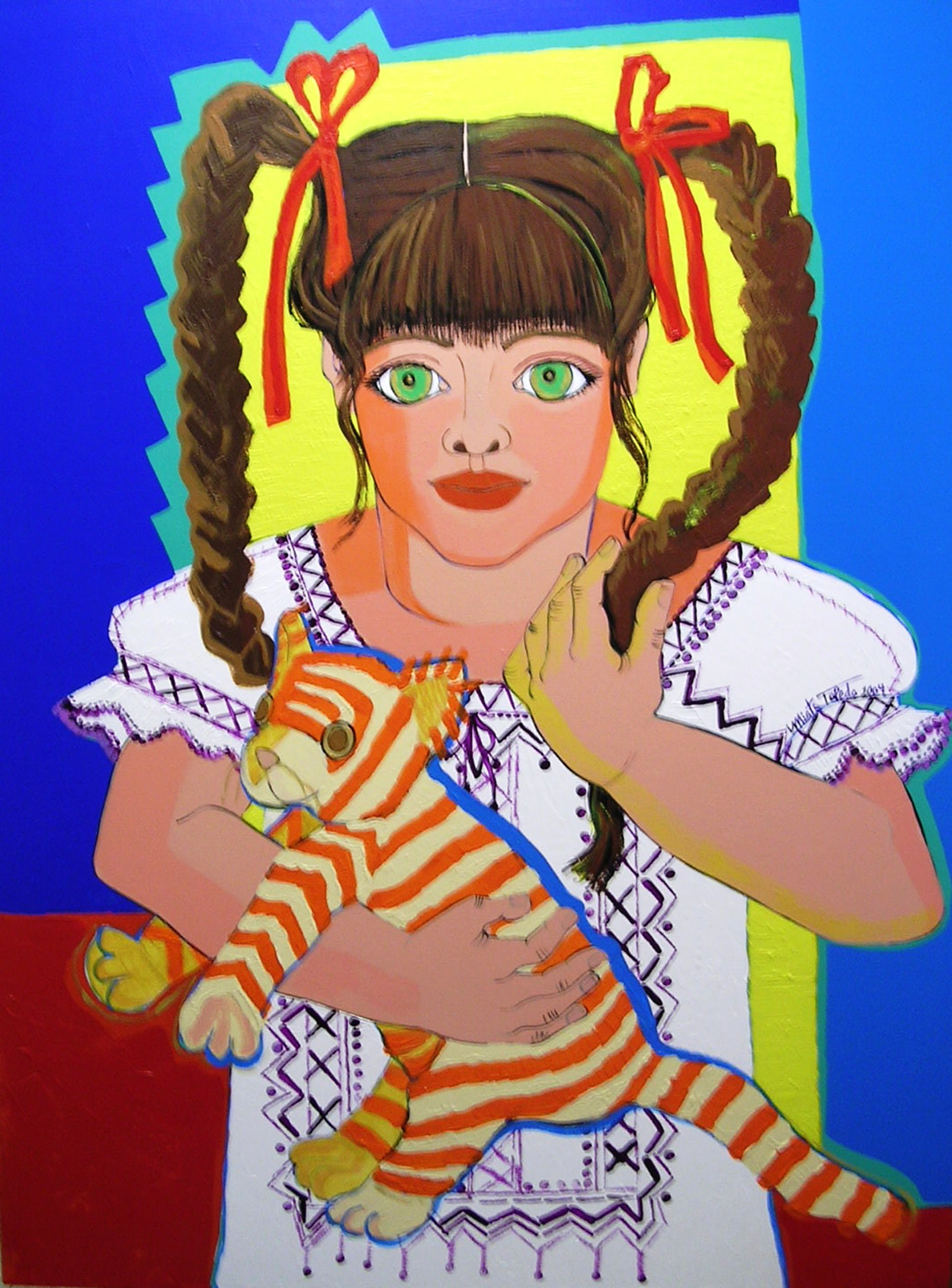
