= Meli Valdés Sozzani =

Argentine artist (born 1977)

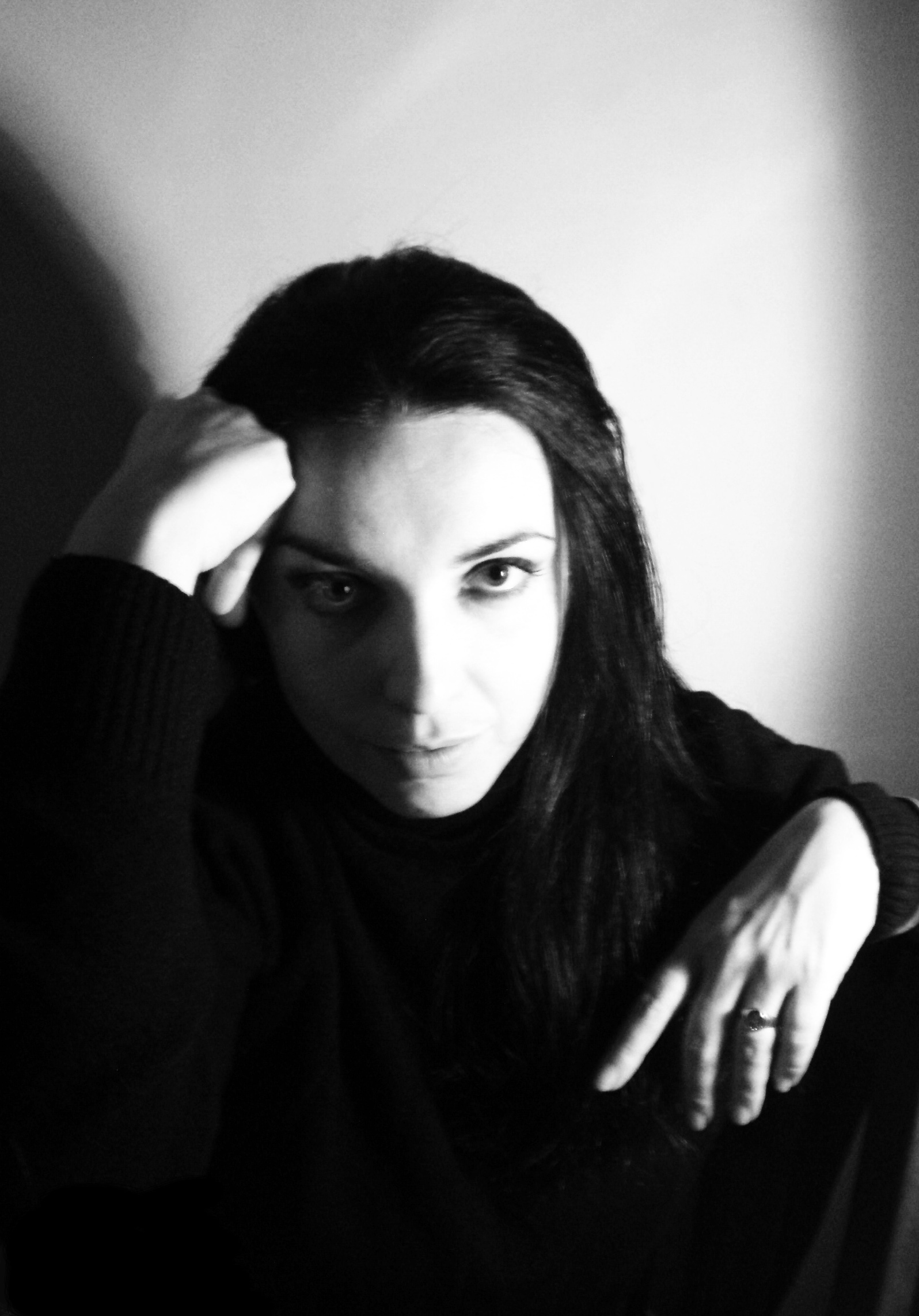
- Valdés Sozzani in 2000
- Born: María Amelia Valdés Sozzani; 1977 (age 48–49); La Plata, Buenos Aires, Argentina
- Occupation: Painter

María Amelia "Meli" Valdés Sozzani (born 1977) is an Argentine painter.

== Biography ==
Valdés Sozzani was born in La Plata. She started painting at an early age making her first solo exhibition in 1996. Her early works are influenced by surrealism, although of a very personal nature, already evidencing an interest in the symbolic, rather than dreamlike, content of images. These concepts would be characteristic of her future work.

In 1998 a series of her paintings was exhibited in Artexpo New York City, at the Jacob K. Javits Center in New York (Art BusinessNews Show Preview, Feb. 1998, ISSN 0273-5652). On that occasion she received the Artist Pavilion Award in recognition to the originality of her work. Her works have been exhibited in her country, the United States and Italy.

In 2006, in collaboration with the Argentine writer Alejandro Córdoba Sosa, she made a series of forty illustrations based on the flash fiction stories that make up the book Doscientos y un cuentos en miniatura (Two Hundred and One Miniature Stories).

In 2013, on the occasion of the seventh centenary of the birth of Giovanni Boccaccio, she made a series of paintings inspired by the Decameron.

== Style ==
Figuration in Valdés Sozzani's art is a means to explore the deeper realities behind the concrete in order to reveal the subtle frame that hides behind the sensible world. Time, a constant theme in her work, results in enigmatic images of moving lyricism. Her paintings are also characterized by high brightness and chromatic richness.
