= Delia Cugat =

Argentine artist

- Born: 1935 (age 90–91); Argentina
- Movement: Graphic arts, fine art, educator

Delia Cugat (born 1935) is an Argentine artist who has lived and worked in Paris for most of her professional career, with her partner Sergio Camoreale, also a well-known fellow Argentine artist). Cugat is one of the founding members of the graphic art group Grabas. Cugat's work encompasses the solitary everyday world of Edward Hopper, the pictorial reflection of Balthus, and the Cubist idea of composition of Jacques Villon. She has her own world of meanings and has established herself as belonging to that of the Latin American greats.

== Early life, education, and career ==
Cugat was born in Argentina in 1935. Since the end of the 1950s, Cugat has been pursuing a means of self-expression. She began when she was very young, studying at the School of Fine Arts in Buenos Aires. In 1958, she entered the world of the theater, where she made sets, design costumes, and ventured into directing plays and ballets. A trip to Europe a few years later led her to continue her studies at the School of Fine Arts. While there, she apprenticed under and learned a great deal from renowned Argentine artist, Horatio Butler. Later, for two years, she worked in the Studios of the Museum of Modern Art in Rio de Janeiro. In the 1970s she returned to Buenos Aires and with three other artists, Pablo Obelar, Daniel Zelaya and Sergio Camporeale, founded the Grabas Group. As a graphic arts group, the Grabas group had full access to a printmaking workshop in Buenos Aires, which allowed them to explore a broad range of printmaking media, including etching, lithography, and silkscreen. The Grabas group was active in printmaking presentations at universities and workshops throughout South America, with a particular focus on Argentina, Colombia, and Venezuela. Eventually, the group moved to Paris to seek fame and fortune.

As a member of the Grabas Group, which revolutionized the concept of graphic work, Cugat is considered one of the pioneering artists of Latin America. In her painting, from 1990, Turbulences Argentine School, Delia Expresses the turbulence felt while studying at art school. Here she has painted, using quick painterly brush strokes, a swirling dreamscape with an image of a girl dressed in her night gown, in the act of running through her dream, but somehow unable to escape from the wheel. The essence of her art lies in the structure of composition with its patient brushstrokes, which seek out a sensitive world of modeled tones and structured masses. The action appears invented, fictitious, created merely to give an existence to the image, in a kind of sentimental projection on a specially structured landscape. It is on the basis of this fictitious fabric, the confluence of surfaces, directions, and characters that Cugat manages to liberate the plastic elements of her art.

== Work ==
Cugat's body of work has transitioned significantly from her early years in Argentina till now. Very early on, she used mixed graphic media as a way to express her memories or the feelings associated with them. Her work at this time was structured with very few elements as not to distract from the overall message. A good example of this, stylistic simplicity, is her piece entitled Las Moradas from 1973.

In the early 1980s, after moving to Paris France, Cugat began to work primarily in oil. The works created around this period were muted in tone, mostly shades of tan and gray, and depicted quiet reflective scenes. One such work, Desde el Mirador, from 1980, depicts a man in the background, back to the viewer, looking out, as the title suggests, at a sort of picturesque viewing area. The scene is dominated by architectural features that separate the viewer from the figure. The painting has a sense of melancholy that will come to define Cugat's work in years to come.

In the late 1980s and early 1990s, her work began to incorporate bold and vibrant color schemes. She would continue to utilize vibrant color for the rest of her career. In addition, she began to fracture her paintings in a cubistic fashion and began to make use of looser brushwork. A good example of these new found techniques is a work from 1991 entitled L'adiau. In this piece Cugat depicts a memory of travel and combines it with a feeling of separation. Two figures dominate this scene, they seem to be say goodbye to one another but are far removed from each other, effectively highlighting both the sadness of separation and the feeling of ambiguity.

== Acclaim ==
In Delia's art, there is a kind of all-pervading magic: windswept beaches, seaports with ruffled waves, drop scenes, and decadent interiors. Inside them, an intriguing humanity: Young men and women passionately engaged in some occupation: before, they were deep in endless conversation, now they are frequently alone in company. Some leave the scene, making their exit with great strides, others low in an Art Deco armchair, faintly geometric and uncomfortable, showing us a fleeting or stable profile. […] Emanating from that this is sense of profound and modern melancholy: now we already yearn for what happened barely half a century ago. (This section references Peronism) If they were music in these pictures, as there might be, it would be Revel's or Stravinsky's, or else jazz. As for color, it's abounds, justifying everything: frozen schemes of blues, leading grays, slate, rusty ochers. And flights of steps leading to nowhere, Old-fashioned toys, your metric tile floors, clothes strewn in all directions, sometimes cast aside to reveal the woman's nude body; not a erotic, there's too much anxiety in the scene we spy through the keyhole for anyone to think of the sensuality of the skin.

— Damián Bayón

== Personal influence ==
The following is a direct quote from Cugat concerning her personal perspective and the relative influences in and on her work:

I think the idea is directly related to memory and imagination, as I have always believed that memory is far closer to imagination than to reality. It is as if I work unraveling an inner recollection of a scene, or an atmosphere, or a character, and from there, I try to extract the sensation, and the emotion I felt at the time: through color and light. But I have no prior vision of what the picture will be like. It is very diffuse when it comes to the mind, then afterwards, Little by little; it begins to develop like a conversation, as the picture progresses. It has a lot to do with memory and imagination, an esthetic revelation. I find contrast fascinating. I begin by applying the more neutral colors and if I were to continue like that I should end up with a picture in half-tints, which might make me despair. So, at that point, I underlined light and shade and-as I tend to exaggerate-the light always has a weird connotation. I demand more than it is natural to expect. Consequently, in one picture you find: turquoise, red, yellow, and orange shades that have little to do with the original plan, which was to have a muted picture. Then you see that those touches of color are like holes in the canvas, real openings or windows. I am very fond of blue it is a difficult color, but I use a lot of turquoise tones and neutral grays, I need blue as a force capable of giving vigor to the picture.

== Selected exhibitions ==
=== Solo ===
- 1995 Habitante Gallery, Panama, Panama
- 1994 The Americas Collection, Coral Gables, Florida, U.S.A.
- 1993 Habitante Gallery, Panama, Panama
- 1992 Cultural Salon of Avianca, Bogota, Colombia
- 1991 Francony Gallery, Paris, France
- 1988 Arte Autopista Gallery, Medellin, Colombia
- 1986 Ruta Correa Gallery, Freiburg, Germany
- 1985 Dana Ravel Gallery, Austin, Texas, U.S.A
- 1984 Mary Ann Martin Fine Art, New York, New York, U.S.A
- Del Reino Gallery, Buenos Aires, Argentina
- 1983 Galería Garcés Velásquez, Bogota, Colombia
- 1981 Gisele Linder Gallery, Basel, Switzerland
- 1979 Giannini Gallery, La coruña, Spain
- Gallery Kandinsky, Madrid, Spain
- 1977 Krief-Raymond, Paris, France
- Gian Ferrari, Milan, Italy

=== Group ===
- 1995 Espacio Gallery, San Salvador, El Salvador
- 1994 4th Art Biennial, Cuenca, Ecuador
- 1991 Francony Gallery, Chicago, Illinois
- 1990 Francony Gallery, Paris, France
- 1988 Ruta Corre Gallery, Freiburg, Germany
- 1985 Kornfeld Gallery, Berna, Switzerland
- Del Estoril Art Gallery, Lisboa, Portugal
- Galerie Artcurial, Paris, France

=== Museum exhibitions and collections ===
- Nacional Museum, Bogota, Colombia
- La Tertulia Museum, Cali, Colombia
- Monterrey Museum, Monterrey, Mexico; Art Museum of the Americas, Washington D.C.
- National Museum of Fine Arts, Buenos Aires, Argentina
- Contemporary Art Museum, Pereira, Colombia
- Contemporary Art Museum, Caracas, Venezuela
- Collection Barbara Duncan, University of Texas, Austin, U.S.A.
