= Carlos Inzillo =

Argentine musician, producer and historian

Carlos Inzillo (born December 15, 1944) is a jazz musician, producer and historian from Argentina.

== Life and work ==
Inzillo was born in Buenos Aires in 1944. He enrolled at the Universidád John F. Kennedy (a private, local college), earning a degree in journalism, and later, a doctorate in social psychology. While still in college, in 1963, he joined Radio Libertad as a programmer for emcee Jorge Ruanova's popular nighttime jazz program, Buenos Aires, Hora Cero ("Buenos Aires at Midnight"), and contributed to a local documentary film as music consultant. Inzillo learned solfège and music theory from well-known Argentine Tango pianist Horacio Salgán during this interim, and mastered the clarinet. He remained on the radio in subsequent years, hosting El diccionario del jazz ("Jazz Dictionary") on Radio Municipal in 1966, Jazz sin barreras ("Jazz without Barriers") on Radio Rivadavia in 1967, Registros inéditos ("Unreleased Recordings") on Radio Municipal in 1968, Jazz a la carta on Radio Nacional in 1973, and Jazz contemporáneo on FM Radio Nacional, in 1976, as well as organizing a number of jazz festivals, beginning with "Jazz & Pop" in 1969, and contributing a jazz column on a number of local magazines and radio programs during the 1970s and 1980s.

Elections in 1983 resulted in Inzillo's appointment as communications director for the General San Martín Theatre, the most important of its kind in Argentina. He leveraged this post for the establishment of an annual jazz festival at the adjacent San Martín Cultural Center, Jazzología. Featuring a varied repertoire and free to the public, Jazzología premiered successfully on September 4, 1984, leading to Inzillo's creation of a smaller, outdoor version of the event, Jazz al caer la tarde ("Evening Jazz"), which he hosted at the center's southern plaza from 1985 to 2001.

Jazzología attracted both local and international vocalists and musicians over the next two decades, including Betty Carter, Pierre Dørge and his New Jungle Orchestra, Conrad Herwig, Sandra Mihanovich, Karlheinz Miklin, and Chuck Wayne, among many others. Organized annually by Inzillo with but one interruption (in 2007, for the center's refurbishment), the festival attracted over a million spectators in all, and his promotion of jazz in Argentina earned him a distinction as Honorary Citizen of the genre's birthplace, New Orleans, in 1985.

Inzillo's many newspaper interviews for La Nación, La Prensa and Pagina/12 included renowned artists such as Gary Burton, Chick Corea, Al Di Meola, Paquito D’Rivera, B.B. King, Baden Powell, Lalo Schiffrin, Chucho Valdéz and Joe Zawinul. Inzillo returned to radio as host of Jazzología laser, on FM Jazz, from 1991, and Raices ("Roots") on Radio Nacional, from 1999 until 2003. A prolific historian in his subject, from 1974 onwards he hosted lectures on jazz-related subjects as diverse as Free Jazz, Alice Coltrane, Stéphane Grappelli, Jelly Roll Morton, Charlie Shavers and Sarah Vaughan. Inzillo was bestowed a Konex Award, the highest in the Argentine cultural realm, in 2005, and directed the Standards program for the 2008 Buenos Aires Jazz Festival.
