= Pablo Curatella Manes =

Argentine sculptor (1891–1962)

- Born: December 14, 1891; La Plata, Argentina
- Died: November 14, 1962 (aged 70); Buenos Aires
- Known for: Sculpture, engraving
- Movement: Cubism; Modernism
- Spouse: Germaine Derbecqre (m. 1922)

Pablo Curatella Manes (December 14, 1891 – November 14, 1962) was a prolific Argentine sculptor.

== Life and work ==
Born in La Plata in 1891 to Clara Manes, a Greek Argentine immigrant, and Antonio Curatella, from Italy, Curatella Manes first acquired an interest in sculpture during his frequent childhood visits to the newly inaugurated La Plata Fine Arts Museum. He entered the labor force in 1905 as a typographer in a printing house, though an accident some months later ended his career in that industry. Drawing on his childhood interest, he was taught the basics of sculpture by Arturo Dresco, who owned a local atelier.

The Curatellas relocated to Buenos Aires, where the young sculptor enrolled in the National Fine Arts School in 1907. A rebellious streak promptly led to his expulsion, though Curatella earned an apprenticeship in 1908 under Lucio Correa Morales, with whom he worked on a number of works commissioned by Public Parks Director Charles Thays. Following the 1910 elections, he created a commemorative gold medal for Vice President-elect Victorino de la Plaza, who secured a scholarship for Curatella that took him to Florence and Rome. Curatella traveled extensively in Italy, as well as much of western Europe, touring the region's museums and cathedrals. On his return to Argentina in 1912, National Fine Arts School director Ernesto de la Cárcova nearly ordered the funds' repayment, objecting to travel and activities not covered by the scholarship, desisting from the punishment after being shown a folio of Curatella's prolific work.

His first Buenos Aires exhibit, in 1912, was followed by a return to Europe. He settled in the Montparnasse section of Paris and studied under Aristide Maillol and Emile-Antoine Bourdelle, but was forced to return home after the outbreak of World War I. In his native La Plata he opened an art gallery, the Salón de Otoño (Autumn Salon), in 1916. A brief return in 1917 to Paris, where Curatella worked under Maillol, Maurice Denis and Paul Sérusier, was eventually followed by a second scholarship, with which he settled in Paris in 1920. Studying under Henri Laurens, Juan Gris, Constantin Brâncuși and Le Corbusier, Curatella explored Cubism, and his sculptures became more avant-garde; he also established his first atelier, where he acquired the habit of creating and destroying sculptures in a single day.

He married French painter Germaine Derbecqre in 1922 and in 1926, was given a post in the Argentine Embassy. Returning to Argentina in 1929, he exhibited Las Tres Gracias (The Three Graces), which marked a departure towards the Abstract which would typify his work in subsequent years. Commissioned to create wall reliefs for the Argentine Pavilion in the 1937 Paris Exhibition, Curatella returned to France and opened an atelier on rue Lauriston, in Paris. His monumental Tierra Argentina and Los Dos Hemisferios ("Argentina" and "The Two Hemispheres") earned him the honor of serving in the Paris Exhibition's sculpture jury, and following the event, he was made an Officer of the Légion d'honneur. Reappointed to the embassy in 1939 as a chargé d'affaires, Curatella oversaw the repatriation of Argentine nationals in France following the Nazi invasion of France in 1940. Following World War II, he oversaw the reopening of the Argentine Embassy, as well as the reconstruction of the Boulogne-Sur-Mer home where the hero of the Argentine War of Independence, General José de San Martín, died in 1850.

Curatella continued to sculpt during his diplomatic tenure, and was among those who in 1946 reinaugurated the Salon des Indépendants, an artists' society and exhibit series banned by the Vichy regime. He remained active in the salon until being transferred to the Embassy in Athens in 1949, upon which he donated thirty-one works to the Argentine government for the purpose of creating a museum of modern art (which were added to the National Museum of Fine Arts, instead). He contributed to Unesco festivals and was appointed to the organizing committee for Expo 58, while accepting a commission from architect Mario Roberto Álvarez for two reliefs, El Drama and La Comedia, for display in the public San Martín Theatre, inaugurated in 1960. Curatella returned to the diplomatic corps in 1958, as an official in the Argentine Embassy in Brussels, whereby he oversaw the Argentine pavilion at Expo 58 and was honored with the Order of Leopold. Invited as a commissioner of the 1961 Paris Biennale, he reopened his rue Lauriston atelier. His El Guitarrista and Torso Femenino were acquired by the Modern Art Museum of the City of Paris, but a sudden illness forced the noted sculptor to return to Buenos Aires, where he died in 1962, at age 70.

He lived to see his vision for the Buenos Aires Museum of Modern Art, which was opened in 1956 by art critic Rafael Squirru; a number of Curatella's works are among its collections.
