= Buenos Aires Museum of Modern Art =

Coordinates: 34°37′19″S 58°22′14″W

- Museo de Arte Moderno de Buenos Aires

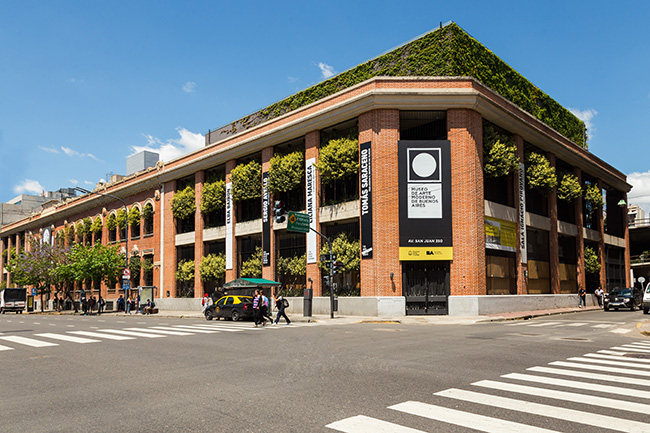
- Established: April 11, 1956; 68 years ago
- Location: San Telmo, Buenos Aires, Argentina
- Type: Art museum
- Owner: City of Buenos Aires
- Website: museomoderno.org

The Buenos Aires Museum of Modern Art, known locally as the Museo de Arte Moderno de Buenos Aires (MAMBA), is a modern art museum located in the San Telmo district of Buenos Aires, Argentina.

== History ==
The museum opened on April 11, 1956, and resulted from an initiative by sculptor and diplomat Pablo Curatella Manes and art critic Rafael Squirru, who served as its first director. Initially located in Buenos Aires' Witcomb Gallery, the museum was later housed in the San Martín Cultural Center. The museum moved to its current location, a former Nobleza Piccardo tobacconist in the San Telmo neighborhood, in 1986.

Following a five-year, 15 million-dollar renovation, the museum's main building was reopened to the public on December 23, 2010; future expansion plans include an addition that would quadruple its existing 3,000 m² (32,000 ft²) of space, and would absorb the library and archives annex, currently located at 963 Adolfo Alsina Street.

== Collections and exhibitions ==
Its collections include over 6,000 works, including those by Josef Albers, Antonio Berni, Pablo Curatella Manes, Raquel Forner, Romulo Macció, Marcelo Pombo, Marta Minujín, Emilio Pettoruti, Xul Solar and Wassily Kandinsky, among many other artists.
