= Buenos Aires Jazz Festival =

- Genre: Jazz, Jazz fusion, Latin jazz, Nuevo tango
- Dates: varying
- Locations: Buenos Aires; Argentina
- Years active: since 2002
- Website: Buenos Aires Jazz Festival

The Buenos Aires Jazz Festival is a music festival first organized in its current form by the city government of Buenos Aires in 2002. The festival takes place in multiple venues, attracting around 36,000 spectators during each of its first few years and over 70,000 in 2012.

== Overview ==
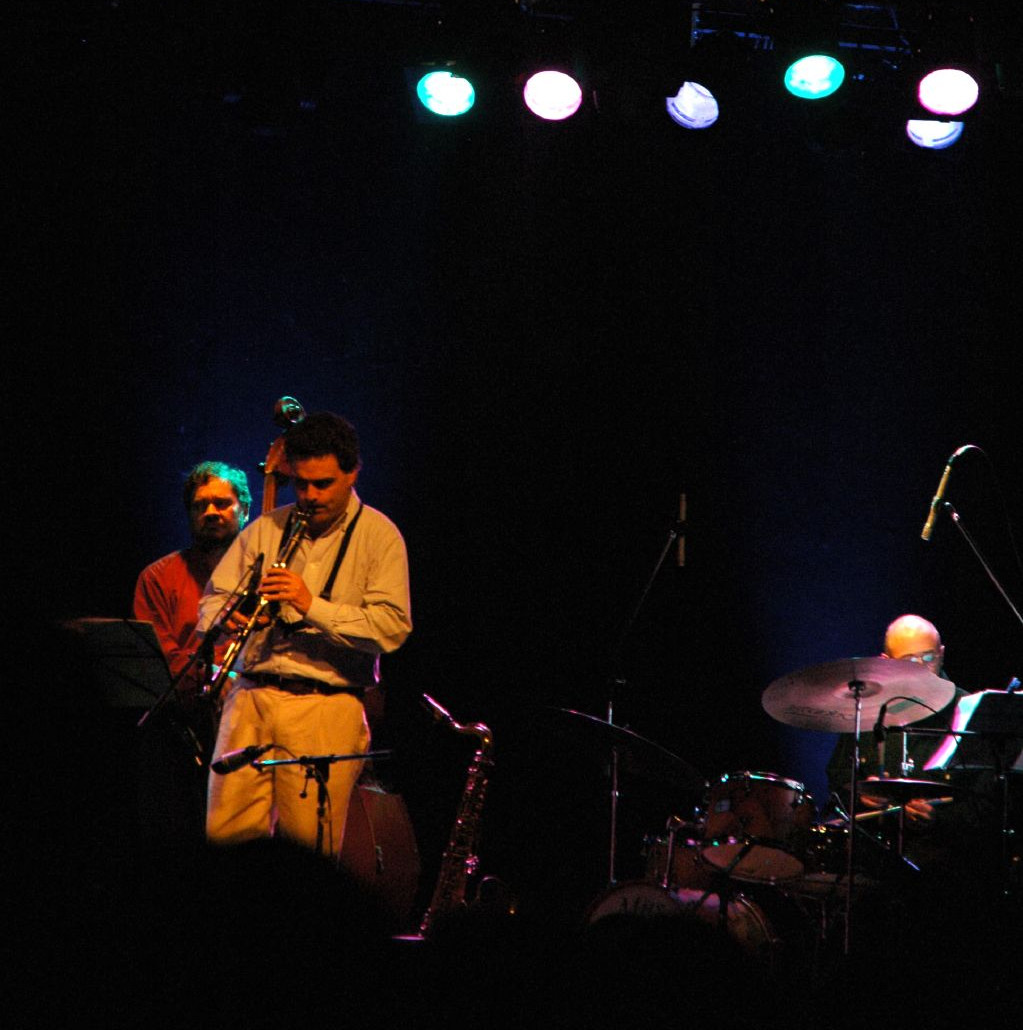
The Adrián Iaies Quartet perform at the Notorious Jazz Club

The Buenos Aires Jazz Festival was inspired, in part, by the after-dinner "café concerts" popular in large Argentine cities during the 1960s and '70s. This was followed by Carlos Inzillo's Jazzología, which he first organized in September 1984 and remains the oldest continuously-running jazz festival in Argentina.

Jazz festivals had been organized intermittently in Buenos Aires and a number of other Argentine cities, such as Rosario, La Plata and Avellaneda, during the 1990s. Defying conventional wisdom during the depths of a severe economic crisis, the city of Buenos Aires announced a Buenos Aires Jazz Festival in July 2002. This first event was held on August 6-20, and was free to the public. Featuring mostly local artists, notably Pablo Ziegler and Dino Saluzzi, it was held in three locations: Thelonious, Notorious, and The Casual Bar.

The event's success led to a second festival in April 2003, with the addition of the important San Martín Cultural Centre as a venue and with the introduction of paid ticket admission. U.S. jazz vocalist Jane Blackstone was among the 2003 festival's notable international guests. Since then, the event has attracted other internationally renowned jazz artists, among them Kenny Barron, Anthony Braxton, Michael Brecker, Dee Dee Bridgewater, Ron Carter, Dave Douglas, David Gilmore, Herbie Hancock, Fred Hersch, Freddie Hubbard, Rosa Passos, Wayne Shorter, Ralph Towner, Chucho Valdés, Randy Weston, and Cassandra Wilson.

Local pianist Adrián Iaies has been the festival's artistic director since 2007.
