= Hilton Buenos Aires =

Five star hotel in Buenos Aires, Argentina

Coordinates: 34°36′21″S 58°21′49″W

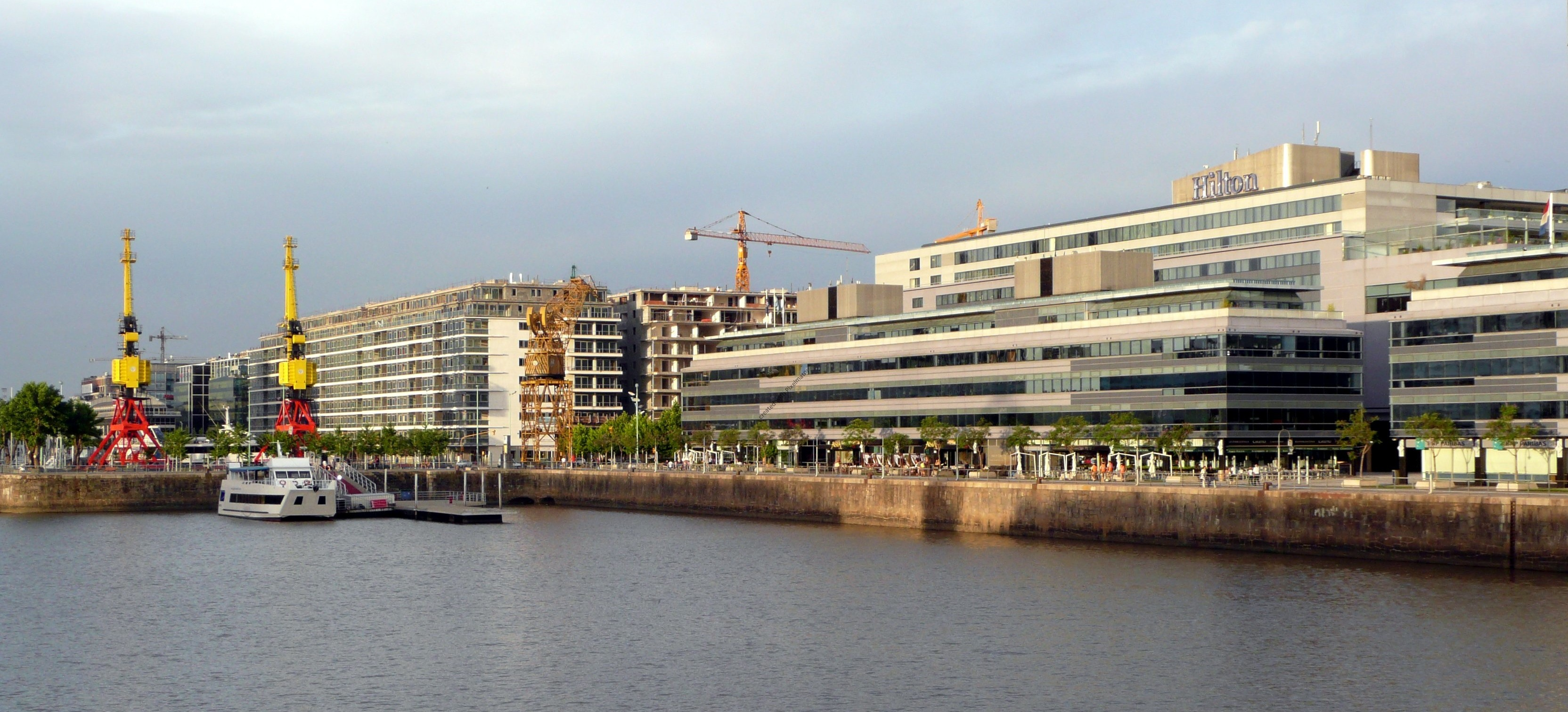
- Interactive map of the Hilton Buenos Aires area
- Hotel chain: Hilton Hotels & Resorts

General information
- Location: Buenos Aires, Argentina, Macacha Güemes 351
- Opening: January 2000

Design and construction
- Architect: Mario Roberto Álvarez

Website
- Hilton Buenos Aires

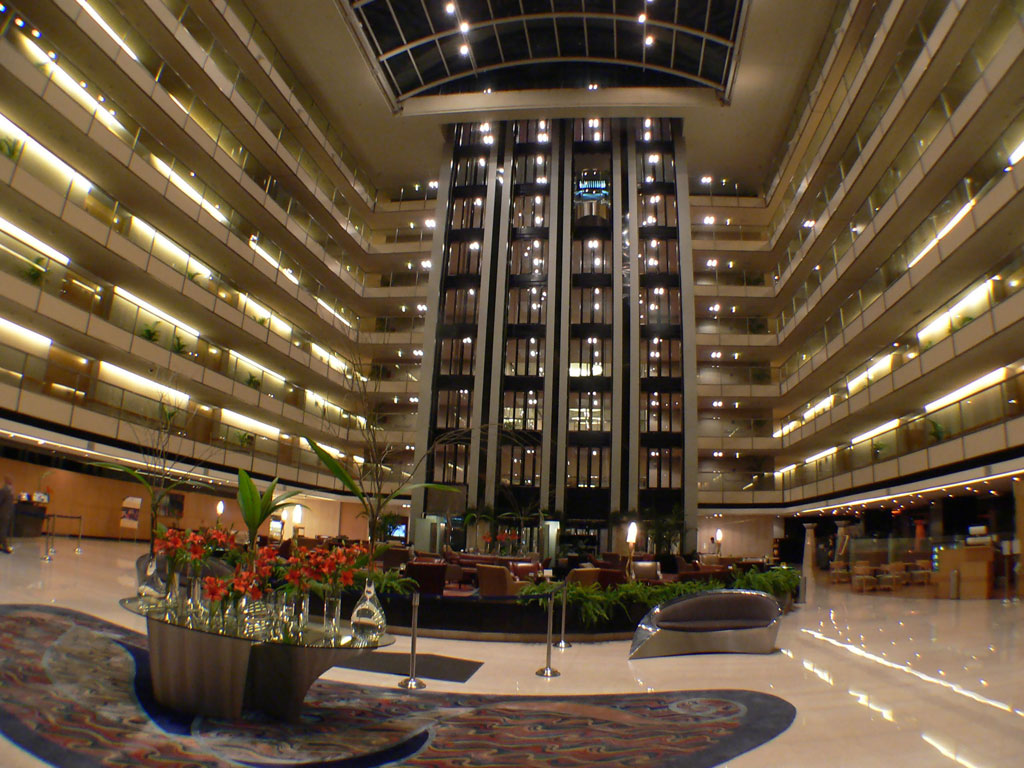
Atrium

The Hilton Buenos Aires is a five star hotel in the Argentine capital. The establishment is located in the city's Puerto Madero section.

== Overview ==
The Hilton Buenos Aires was designed by Mario Roberto Álvarez, constructed by local developer Benito Roggio at a cost of around US$80 million, and inaugurated in January 2000. The seven-story hotel includes 417 rooms.

The hotel collaborated with U.S. toymaker Mattel in 2007 to redesign a number of its rooms thematically, resulting in a 'Barbie' and a 'Hot Wheels' room. Recent prominent guests at the hotel have included former U.S. President Bill Clinton (who hosted a Clinton Global Initiative conference there) and South Carolina Governor Mark Sanford (visiting the city for pleasure).

The Hilton Buenos Aires hosted the 125th IOC Session on September 7–10, 2013, where the International Olympic Committee (IOC) selected Tokyo to be the host city of the 2020 Summer Olympics. Additionally, Thomas Bach was elected as the new president of the IOC during the session.

== In popular culture ==
- The hotel featured prominently in the famous 2000 film Nueve Reinas.
