= Marcelo Pombo =

Argentine artist

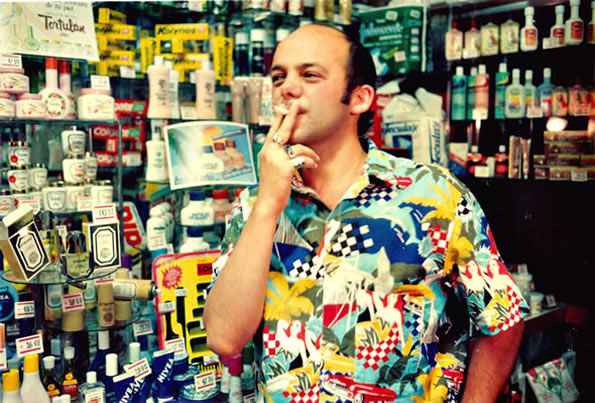
- Portrait of Marcelo Pombo, by Alberto Goldenstein (1990)
- Born: 1959 (age 66–67)
- Style: Latin American contemporary art
- Awards: Premio Nacional a la Trayectoria Artística (2022)

Marcelo Pombo is an Argentine artist, born on 28 December 1959. He is a relevant figure in the Argentine artistic field. His work is in the collections of the Museo Nacional de Bellas Artes, the MALBA, Museo de Arte Latinoamericano de Buenos Aires, the Museo de Arte Moderno de Buenos Aires, the Museo Castagnino + macro, the Blanton Museum of Art of The University of Texas at Austin, among others.

== Work ==
In his early works, in the mid 80s, the influence of gay and underground culture of that time can be noticed.

Since 1989, he formed part of the group of artists that exhibited at the Galería de Artes Visuales at the Centro Cultural Rojas under the direction of Jorge Gumier Maier, an artist and trailblazer curator from that time. The artistic production that came out of the Rojas would have an enormous influence on Argentine art in the 90s.

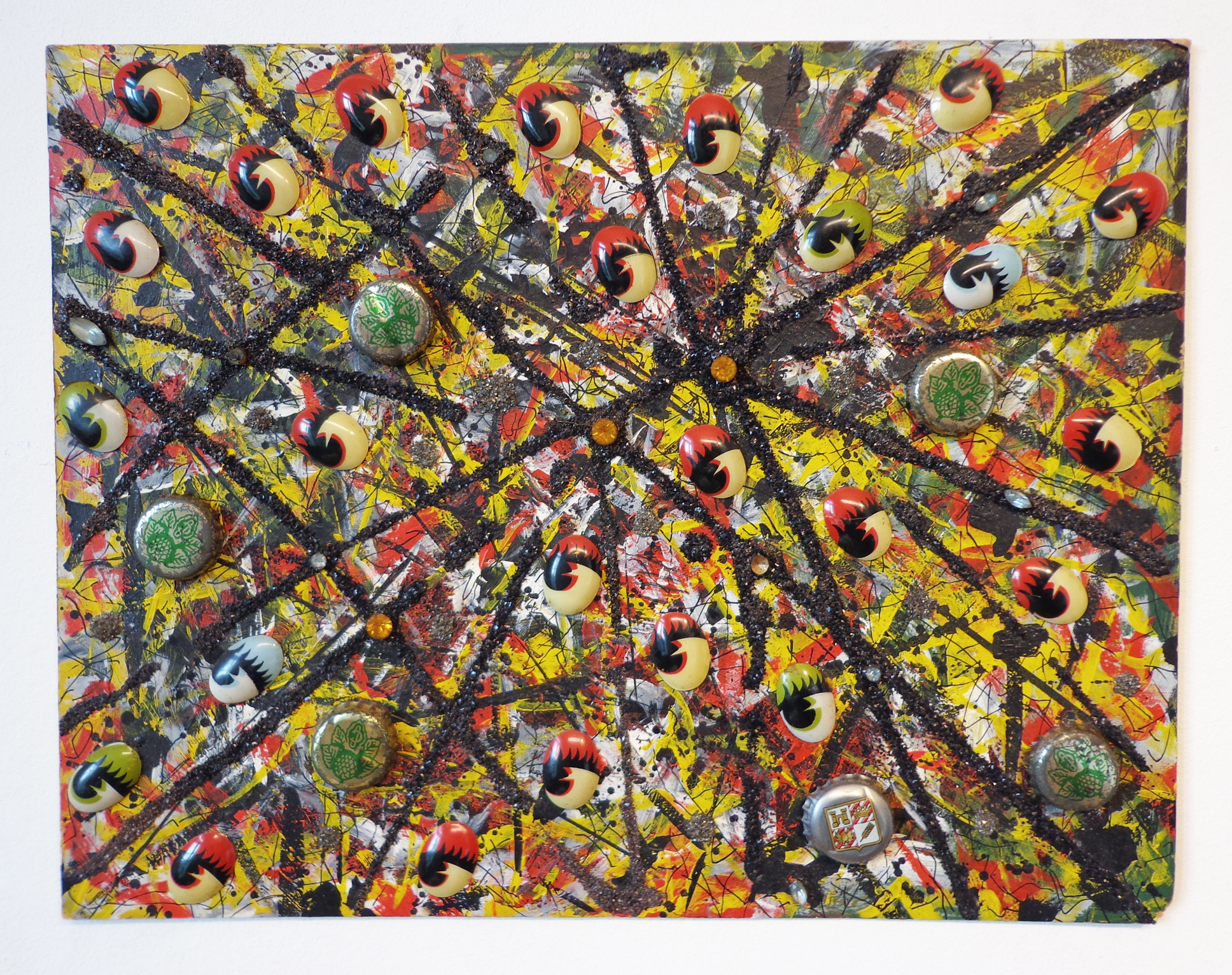
Ojitos y chapitas de cerveza (1986), Marcelo Pombo

During the 2000s his production focused on paintings where he combined surrealism, traditional landscapes and geometric art, among other historical references.

From 2008, his work focuses on the Argentine and Latin American art tradition, withdrawn in the margins of the modern narrative and on eccentric and deviant translations of the avant-garde canon.

== Life ==
=== Early years ===
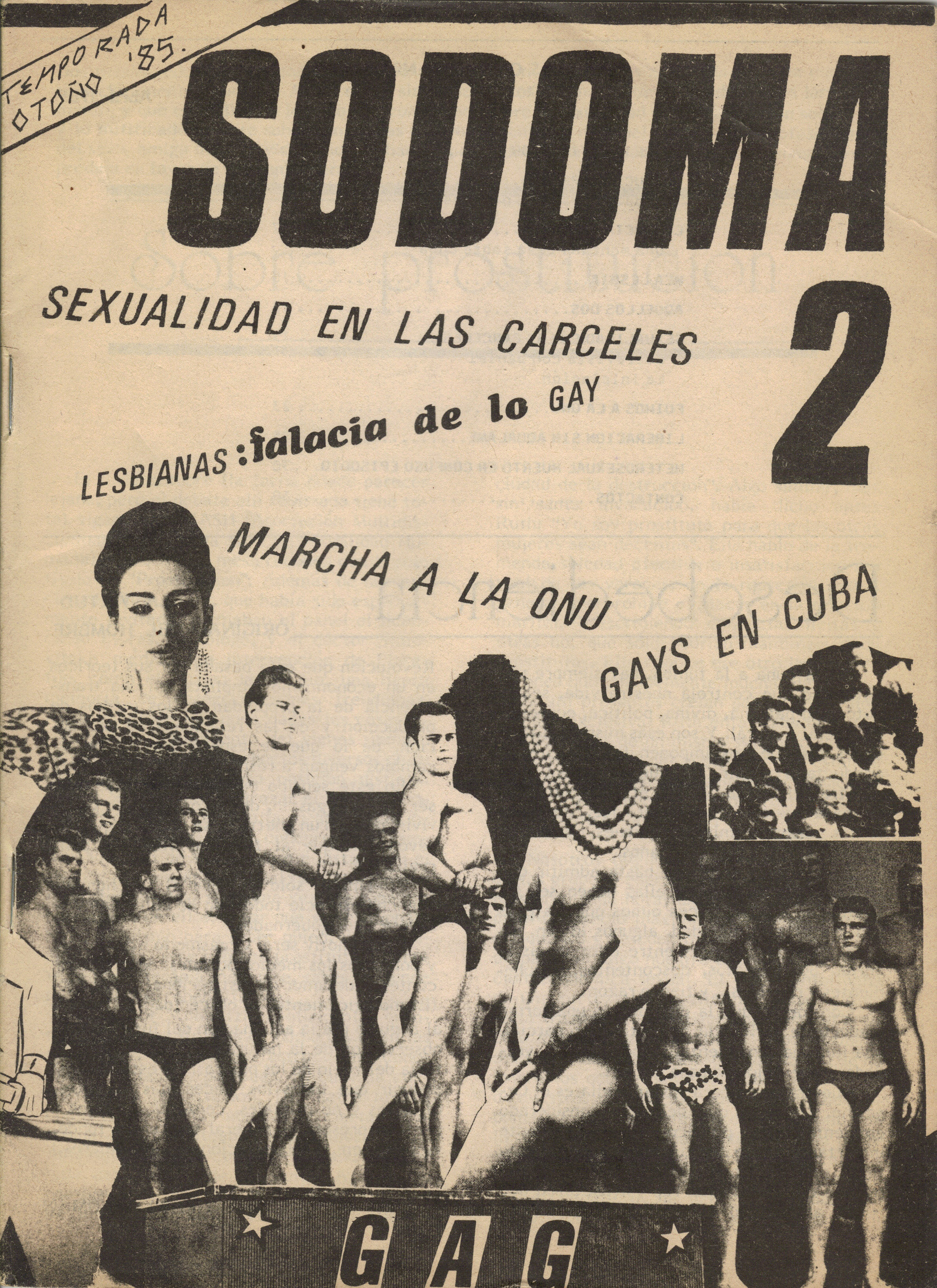
Cover of the magazine "Sodoma 2", fall season 1985, GAG (Grupo de Acción Gay).

He grew up in the Núñez neighborhood -at that time, a neighborhood of immigrant workers in the City of Buenos Aires- in his Italian grandfather's house where his entire family lived. At the age of eight, he attended the "Taller de la Flor" directed by Ana Srezovic. From the age of 11, his family became impoverished and lived in different locations in Buenos Aires. At the initiative of his mother, he attended the San Isidro National School where he met people who were an enriching and stimulating influence during his adolescence.

In 1978, upon finishing high school, he began working as a gofer in an advertising agency, then he entered as an apprentice in a printing house and eventually became a main assistant of offset machine, remaining in this trade for the following years.

=== The 80s ===
In 1982, at the outbreak of the Falkland's War during the last military dictatorship, Marcelo Pombo traveled to São Paulo, Brazil. While there, he produced a series of drawings that make reference to the gay counterculture in that city. In their style, those drawings bear the influence of Walt Disney, Max Fleischer, and underground comics by artists ranging from Robert Crumb to Nazario.

Back in Buenos Aires, in 1983, he resumed his work in the printing houses and at the same time, he began his studies at the Profesorado Nacional de Educación Especial [National Special Education Teacher Training]. Once graduated, he began to work as a teacher in deprived schools in Buenos Aires.

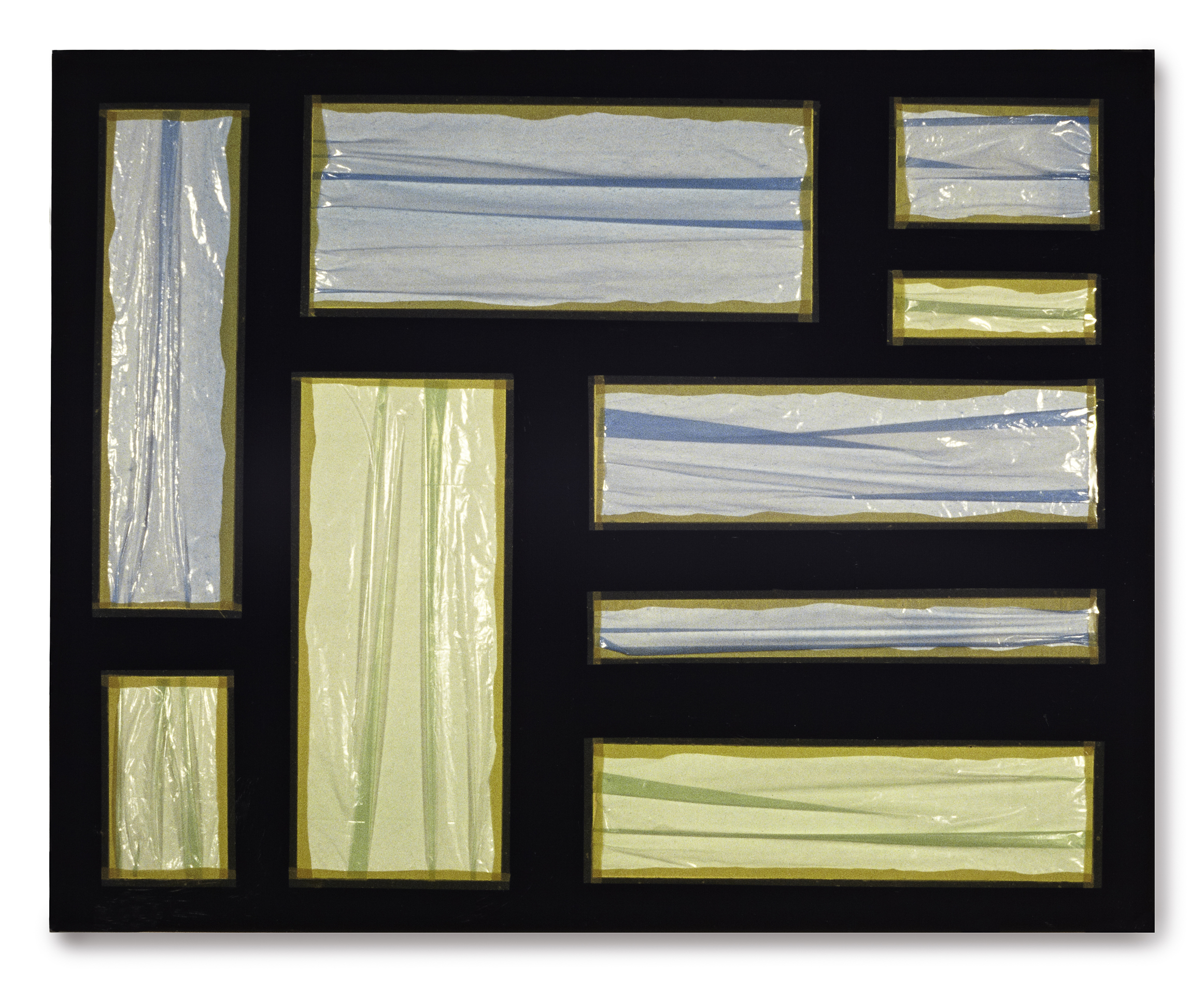
Vitreaux de San Francisco Solano (1991), Marcelo Pombo

In 1984 he began his activism with the Grupo de Acción Gay (GAG) [Gay Action Group (GAG)], where he met Jorge Gumier Maier – cultural journalist, artist and curator – and Carlos R. Luis – left-wing activist and university professor – two decisive friendships for both his professional career and for his personal life.

His first solo show was held at the Espacio Joven of the Centro Cultural Recoleta in 1987, where he exhibited the work Winco.

In 1989, he exhibited at the Galería de Artes Visuales of the Centro Cultural Rojas, including, among others, the work Michael y yo.

He also holds the first of several exhibitions that he will do together with Pablo Suárez and Miguel Harte, where he presents, among other works, Mantel.

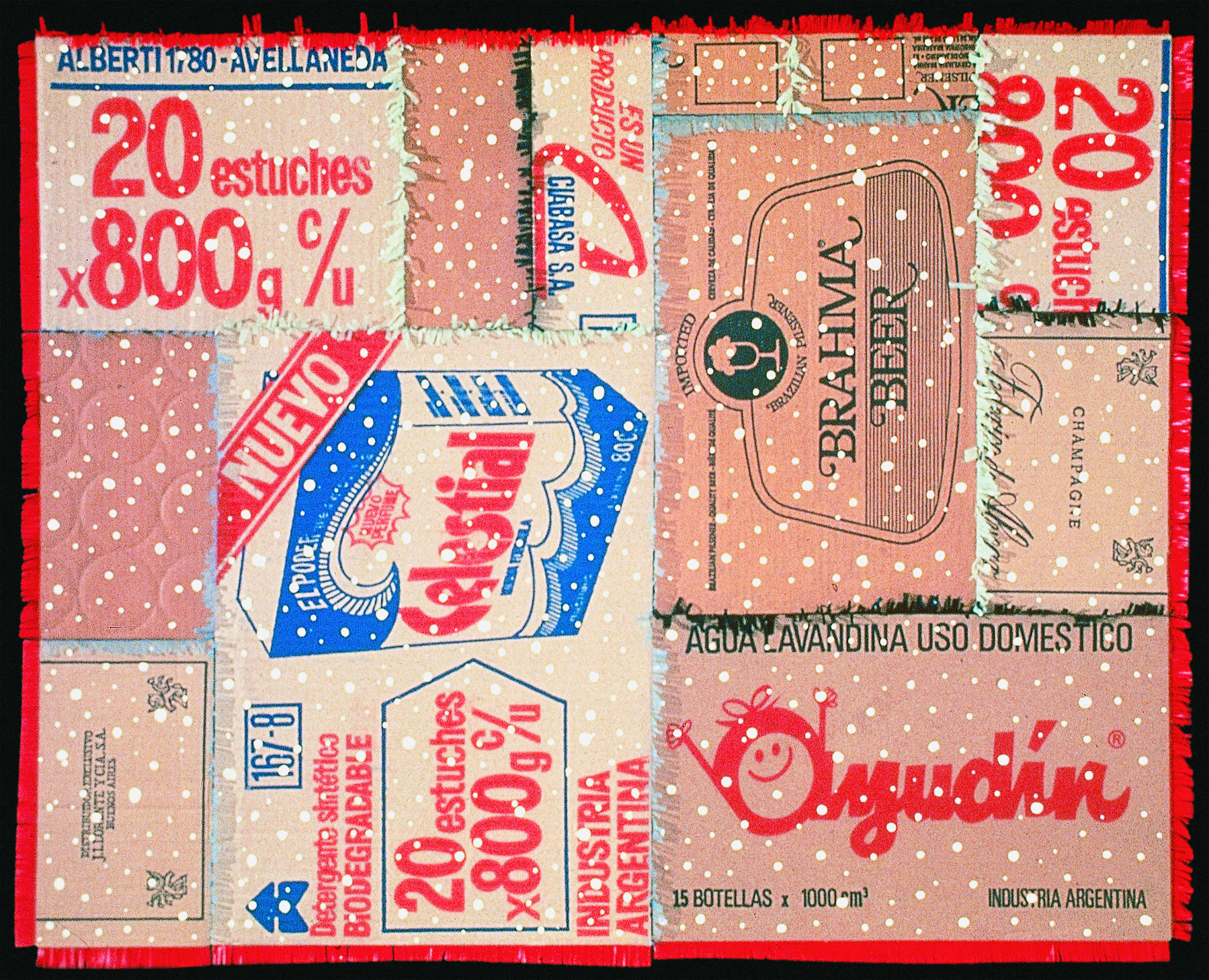
La Navidad de San Francisco Solano (1991), Marcelo Pombo

=== The 90s ===
In 1991 and 1992 he made the San Francisco Solano Trilogy, alluding to the Buenos Aires town where the special school where he works as a teacher is located.

The art historian and critic of the newspaper La Nación, Jorge López Anaya, states the idea of “arte light” [“light art”] as synonymous of a banal, superfluous and de-ideologized aesthetic, associated with artists linked to the Rojas scene.

In 1995 he made the series Dibujos de Puerto Madryn, during a three-month stay in that city.

=== The 2000s ===
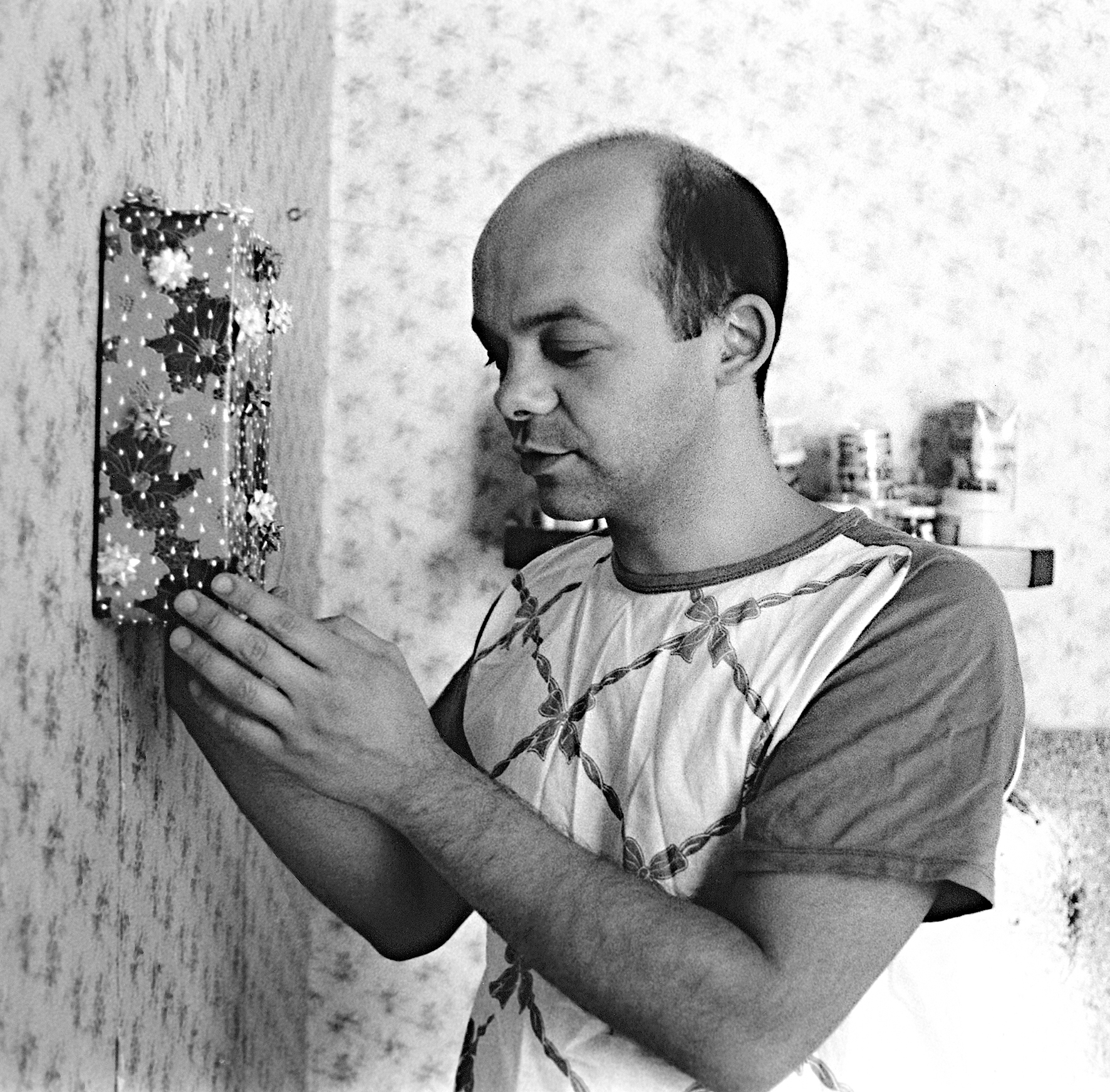
Marcelo Pombo, 1995. Photo: Gian Paolo Minelli.

Over the course of this decade, Pombo held a successful series of exhibitions on the west coast of the United States, where he obtained critical attention from media such as Flash Art, The New York Times, Los Angeles Times, and Frieze.

In 2006, he held the exhibition “Ocho pinturas y un objeto” [Eight paintings and one object] in Buenos Aires. That same year, the book Pombo was published, with texts by Inés Katzenstein, Marcelo Pacheco and Amalia Sato, by Adriana Hidalgo publishing house.

=== 2008 to present ===
In 2008, he held the exhibition “Nuevos Artistas del Grupo Litoral” [New Artists of the Litoral Group] featuring works of the Grupo Litoral founded in 1950, along with his own works and those of other artists such as Emilia Bertolé, Raquel Forner and Mariette Lydis. The exhibition was held at the Museo Castagnino + macro in Rosario.

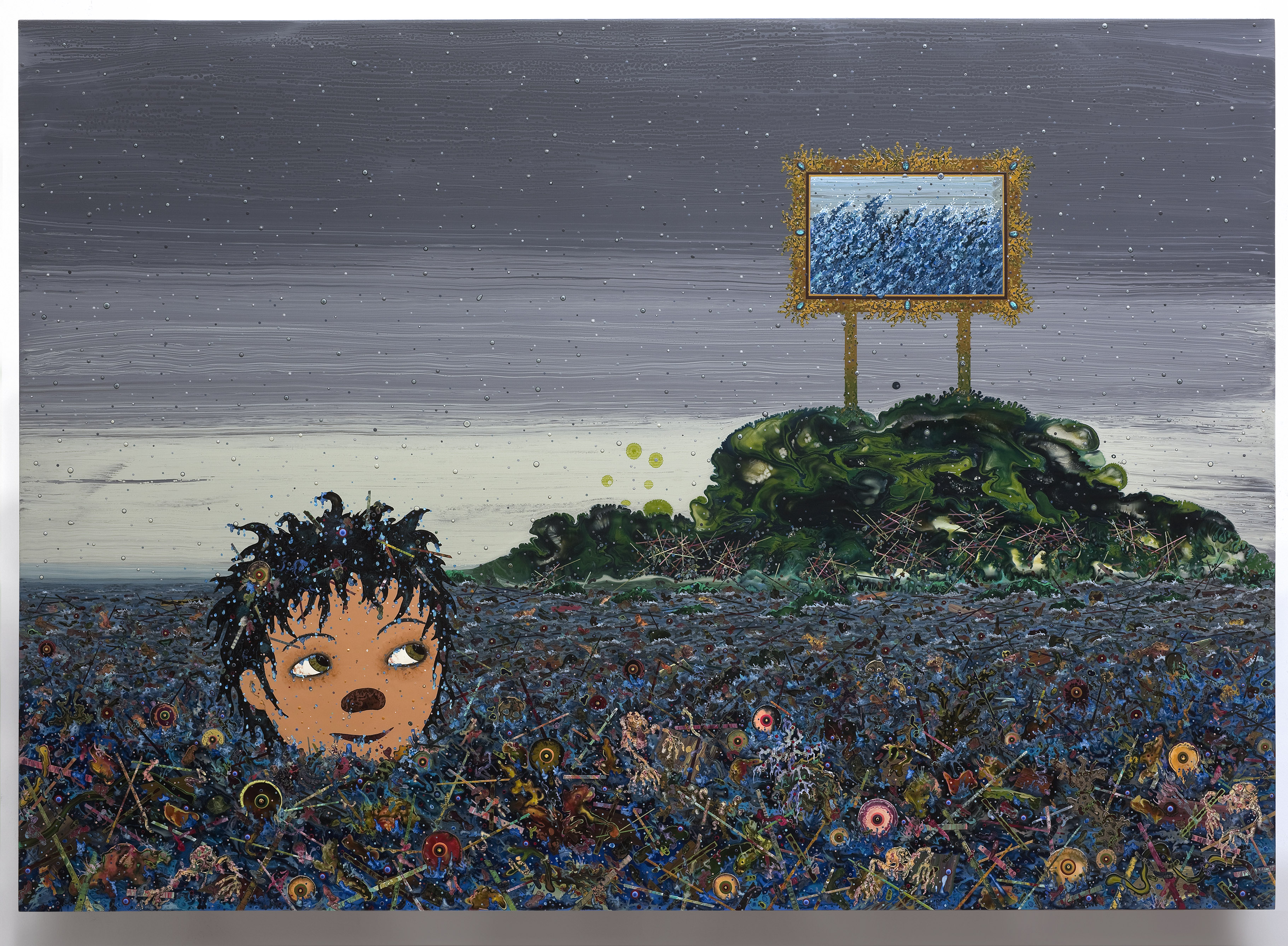
Otro mar (2010), Marcelo Pombo

Since 2010 until recent years, he has carried out courses and workshops in the Artists Program of the Torcuato Di Tella University of Buenos Aires.

In 2011, he participated in the group exhibition “Recovering Beauty: The 1990s in Buenos Aires” at the Blanton Museum of Art. This is the first retrospective exhibition of artists of the Galería del Rojas from the 90s.

In 2012, he created the Museo Argentino de Arte Regional (MAAR), a virtual museum of images found on the Web and, sometimes, digitally intervened.

Between May and August 2015, the retrospective exhibition “Marcelo Pombo, un artista del pueblo” [Marcelo Pombo, an artist of the people] is held in Buenos Aires, curated by Inés Katzenstein at the Amalia Lacroze de Fortabat Art Collection.

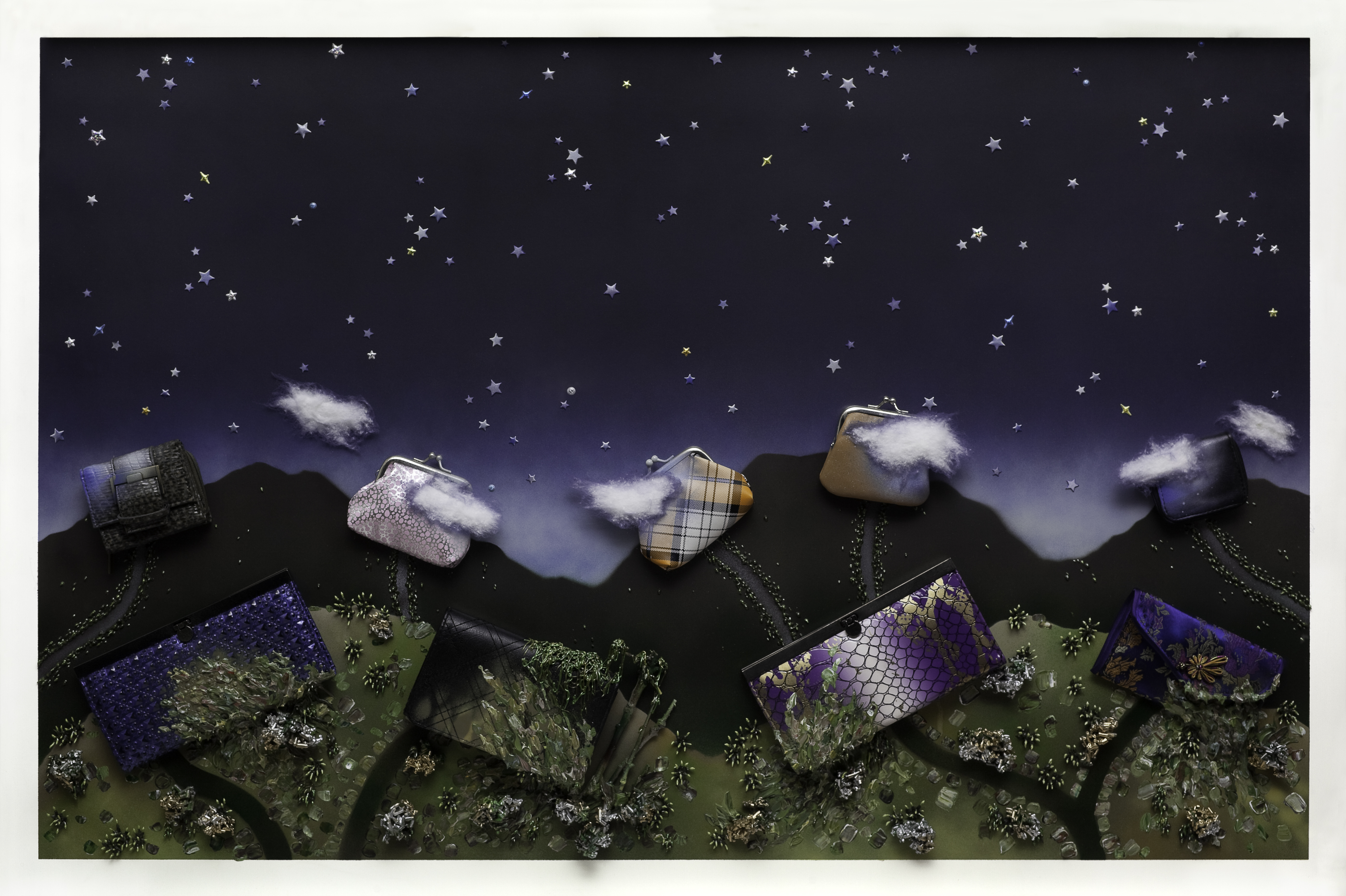
Noche estrellada con casas en las montañas (2012), Marcelo Pombo

In 2021 he created the website http://marcelopomboimagenesliberadas.com/ where he offers a wide selection of his drawings made between 1982 and 2000, under Creative Commons license.

In 2022 the Ministry of Culture of Argentina granted him the Premio Nacional a la Trayectoria Artística [National Award for Artistic Career], in recognition of his contribution to Argentine art, and a group of his works and documents became part of the collection of the National Museum of Fine Arts ( MNBA).
