= Mario Roberto Álvarez =

Argentine architect

- Born: November 14, 1913; Buenos Aires, Argentina
- Died: November 5, 2011 (aged 97); Buenos Aires
- Occupation: Architect
- Buildings: Le Parc tower, Hilton Buenos Aires, Salto Grande Dam, Teatro General San Martín, Ingeniero Aeronáutico Ambrosio L.V. Taravella International Airport

Mario Roberto Álvarez (November 14, 1913 – November 5, 2011) was an Argentine architect.

== Biography ==
=== Early life ===
Born Mario Roberto Álvarez Elissamburu in 1913 in the City of Buenos Aires, to Juana Elissamburu and Jerónimo Álvarez. He enrolled at the University of Buenos Aires School of Architecture in 1932, and graduated in 1936 with Gold Medal of Honours. He married Jorgelina Ortiz de Rozas, and they had two children.

His first design was in 1937, a public building for the new Medical Center (Hospital Clinic) of the private San Martín Medical Group (located in Buenos Aires, in the northwestern suburb of San Martín). In 1938, he was awarded the Ader Scholarship by his alma mater's UBA Faculty of Exact Sciences allowing Álvarez to study and work in Belgium, France, Germany, Italy, the Netherlands and the United Kingdom, during which time he gained experience collaborating on various public housing and public hospital projects.

=== Career ===
He returned to Argentina in 1939 and was named Director of Architecture for the important Buenos Aires suburb of Avellaneda, in 1942. Joining colleagues Leonardo Kopiloff and Eduardo T. Santoro, he established MRA in 1947. The firm's first major contract would be in 1954 with their design for the municipal Teatro General San Martín, the largest center for the stage in Argentina. Its success upon completion in 1960 helped secure MRA the design for the adjoining Centro Cultural General San Martín, built between 1962 and 1970. Other notable projects of Álvarez's in subsequent years included the Hernandarias Subfluvial Tunnel (completed in 1969), the Colón Opera House's labyrinthine production facilities (1972), the Buenos Aires headquarters for the state steel concern, Somisa (1977), the Salto Grande Dam (1979) and numerous office buildings, including the Buenos Aires Stock Exchange annex (1977) and the offices of IBM's Latin American division (1980). He also became a leading designer of residential and hotel properties in Punta del Este, a Uruguayan seaside city popular among Argentine vacationers. Álvarez was inducted into the American Institute of Architects as an honorary member in 1976.

Though an economic crisis during the 1980s resulted in less demand for Álvarez's work, he donated his design for the non-profit Leloir Institute's new facilities (completed in 1983). Some of his best-known designs from this era include the Chacofi building, the Buenos Aires American Express offices (facing San Martín Plaza), and the Costa Galana Hotel (Mar del Plata). An economic recovery in the early 1990s resulted in a rush of landmark designs for MRA, including the Rosario Stock Exchange's new building, the Le Parc tower (completed in 1996, the tallest in Argentina until 2003), the Hilton Buenos Aires (1999) and Microsoft's Latin American headquarters (2000), numerous luxury high-rises in the Recoleta and Palermo sections of Buenos Aires, and others.

Turning 90 in 2003, Álvarez's design for the redevelopment of the Northern District of Osaka, Japan earned him a First Prize at that year's competition. The Galicia Financial Group's new financial district headquarters, designed by MRA, attracted controversy, however, when it resulted in the demolition of a historic building Much as he had done for the new Rosario branch of the Argentine National Bank in 1983, Álvarez struck a compromise by incorporating parts of the beaux-arts façade into the new design. Other notable recent designs include the new Taravella International Airport (Córdoba) terminal, Torre Aqualina (Rosario), the new Proa Foundation cultural center building and the Bariloche Hilton, built into the mountain rock. He was named an Illustrious Citizen of Buenos Aires by the City Legislature in 2007.

Álvarez won the Konex Award in 1992 and 2012, the latter being posthumous. He died in Buenos Aires in 2011, nine days shy of his 98th birthday. He was interred in the Jardín de Paz Cemetery, in Pilar.

== Gallery ==
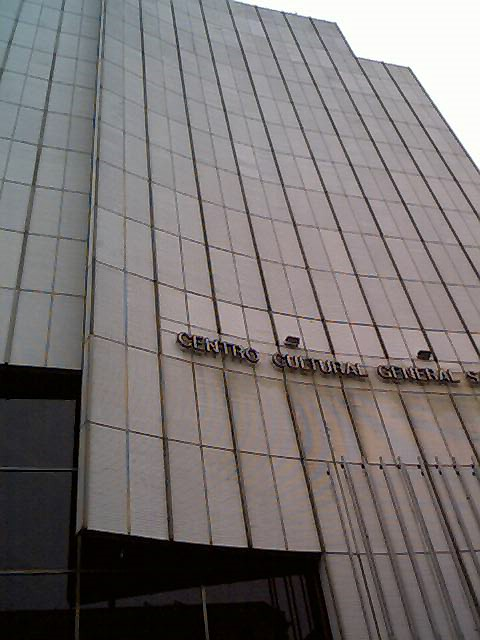
San Martín Cultural Center

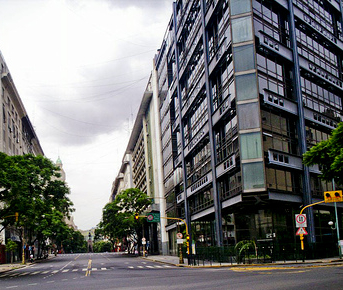
Somisa headquarters

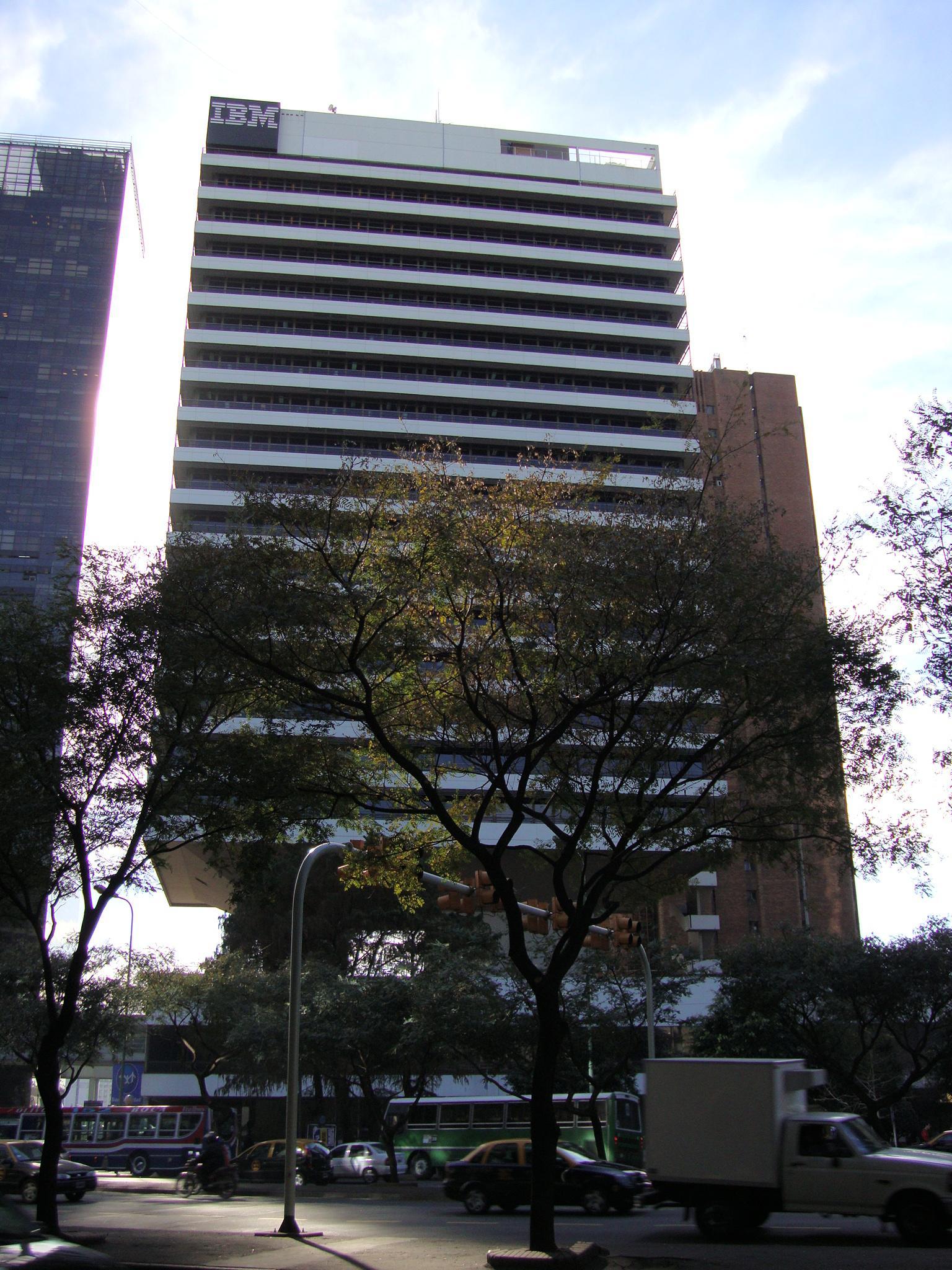
IBM Argentina

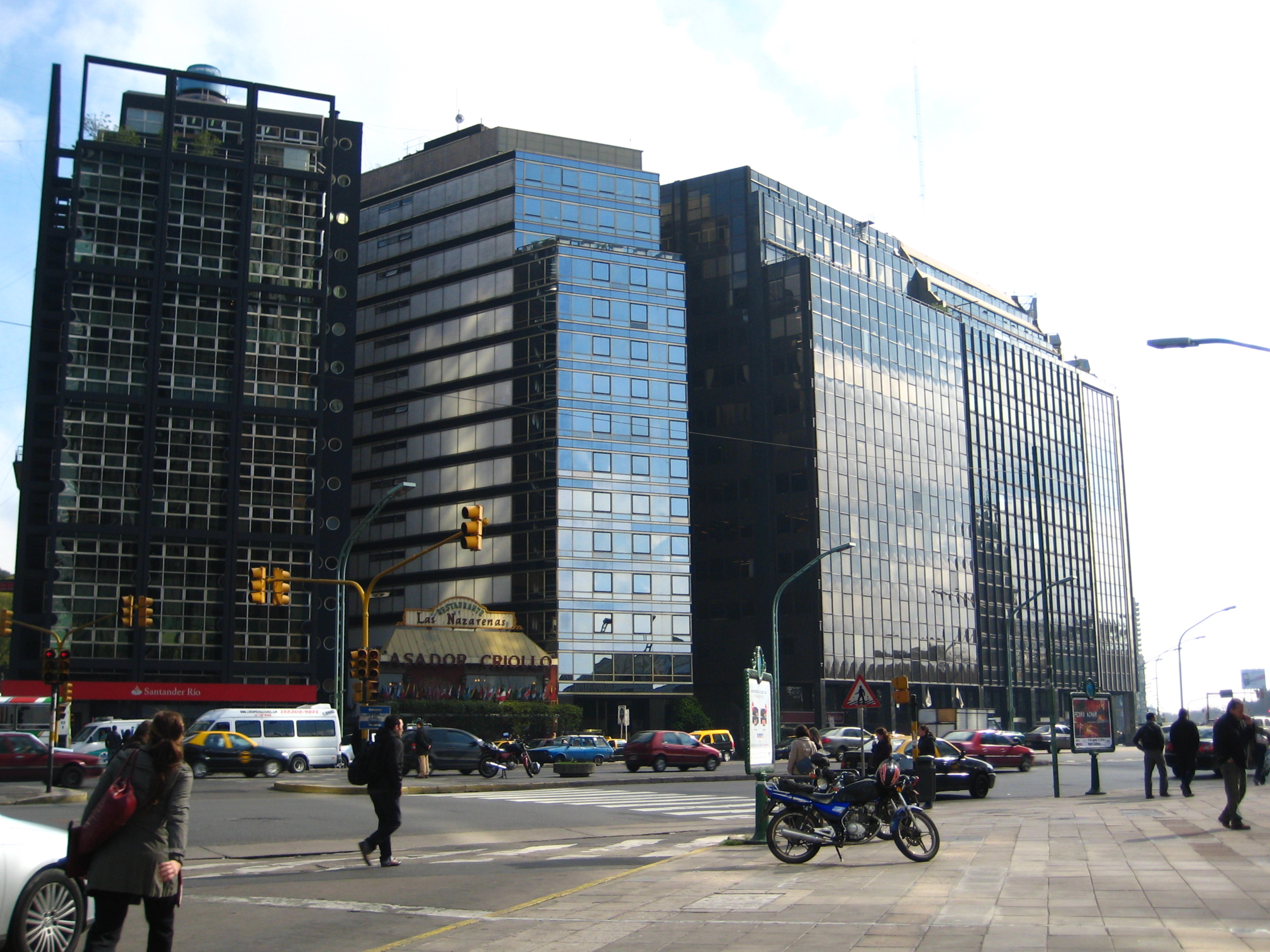
The Álvarez Block,
Leandro Alem Avenue

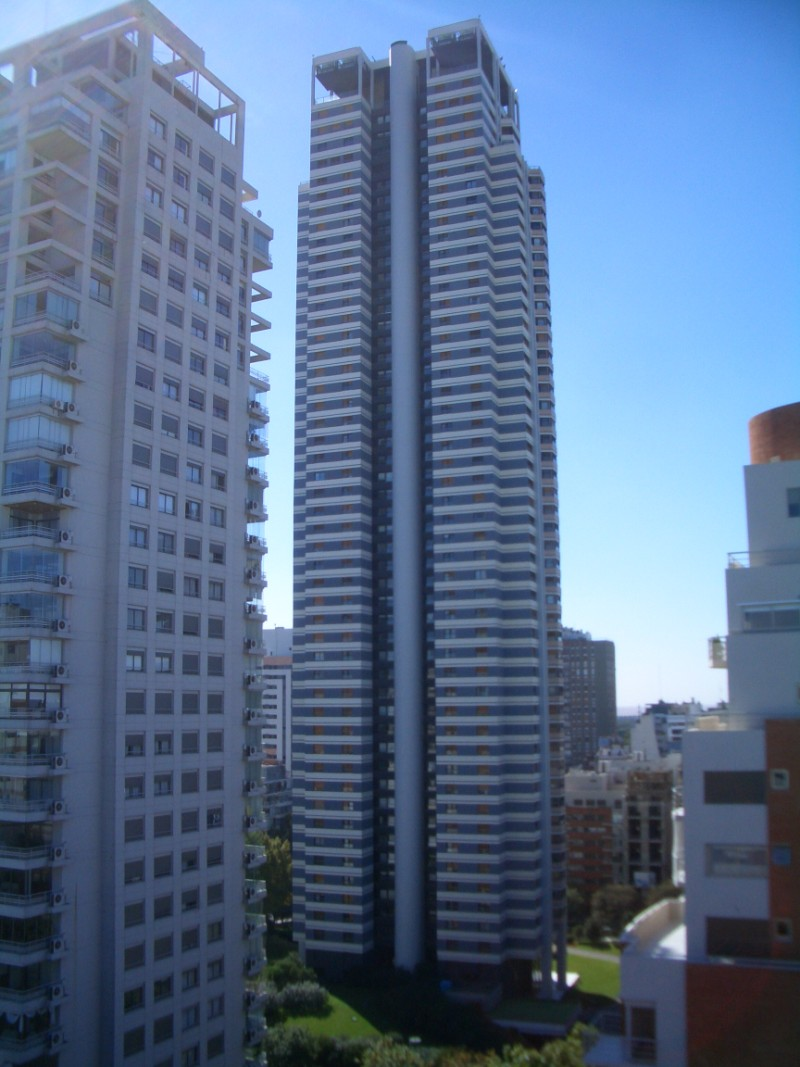
Le Parc Tower

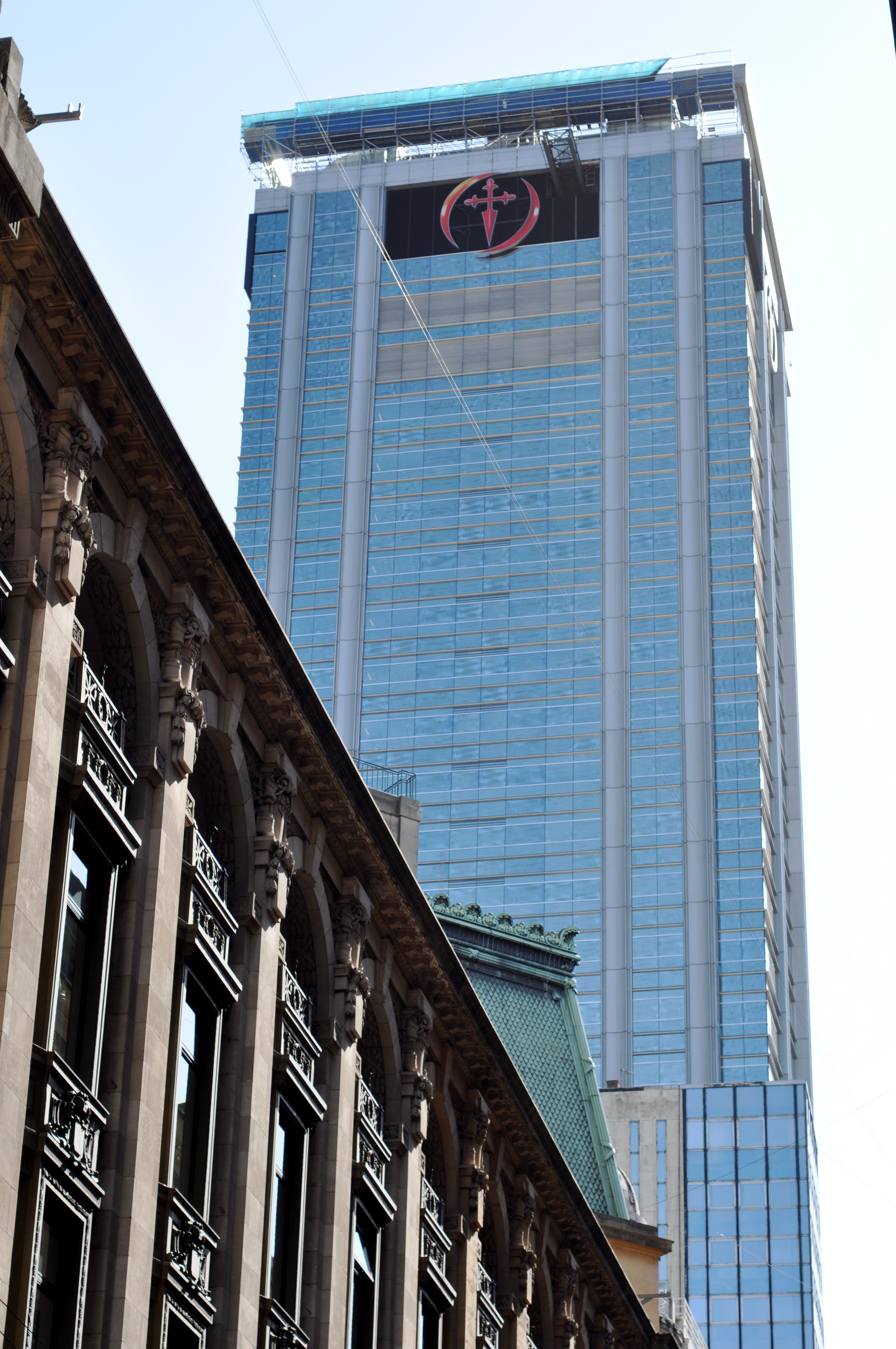
Banco de Galicia
