= Teatro General San Martín =

General San Martín Theater
- Teatro General San Martín

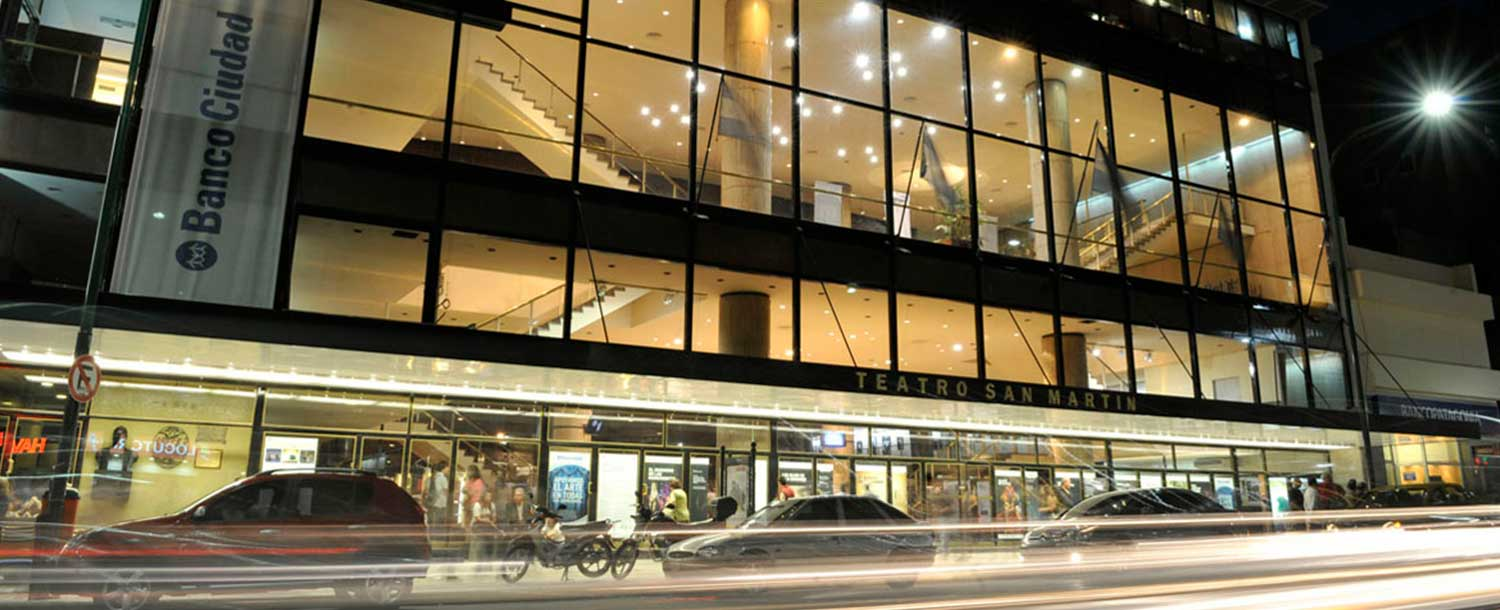
- View of the main facade on Av. Corrientes
- Interactive map of the General San Martín Theater area

General information
- Type: Theater
- Location: Buenos Aires, Argentina, Av. Corrientes 1530
- Coordinates: 34°36′15.9″S 58°23′18.8″W
- Construction started: 1954
- Completed: 1960
- Inaugurated: May 25, 1960; 65 years ago
- Renovated: 2011
- Owner: City of Buenos Aires

Technical details
- Floor count: 13
- Floor area: 30,000 square metres (320,000 sq ft)

Design and construction
- Architect: Mario Roberto Álvarez

Website
- https://buenosaires.gob.ar/teatrosanmartin

The Teatro General San Martín (General San Martín Theater) is an important public theater in Buenos Aires, located on Corrientes Avenue and adjacent to the cultural center of the same name. It is one of the major theaters in Argentina and offers venues for the representation of stage works and film, as well as art exhibitions.

== History ==
Projects for the construction of this theater date to 1908, when Socialist Congressman Alfredo Palacios introduced a bill to that effect. A similar resolution passed the Deliberative Council of the City of Buenos Aires, which authorized the creation of the Buenos Aires People's Theater, and the bill was signed by Mayor Joaquin de Anchorena.

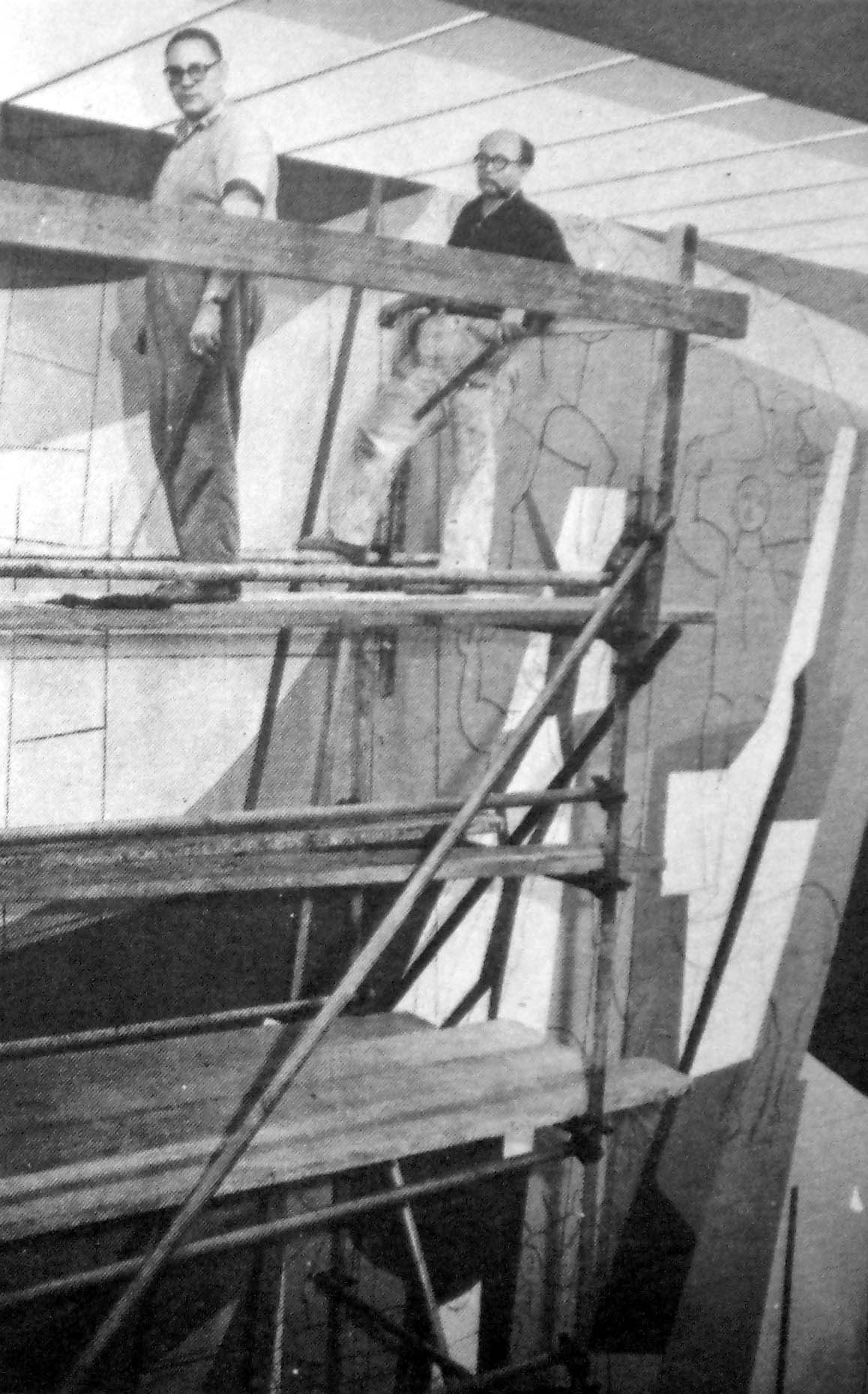
Painters Luis Seoane (left) and Carlos Torrallardona working on a mural in 1957

On 26 November 1936, Mayor Mariano de Vedia and Mitre provided for the construction of a building to house the Teatro del Pueblo, and on 23 December, a theater located on 1530 Corrientes Avenue was expropriated for the purpose. Directed by Leonidas Barletta, the New Theatre received a 25-year concession from the city, though a nationalist 1943 coup d'état resulted in its rescission on 3 December.

The Municipal Theater of Buenos Aires was inaugurated in its stead on 23 May 1944, for the promotion and expansion of the theatre in Argentina. The institution was renamed Teatro General San Martín (in honor of the centennial of the death of General José de San Martín, the hero of the Argentine War of Independence) by order of President Juan Perón, in 1950. Perón commissioned local architects Mario Roberto Álvarez and Macedonio Ruiz for the design of a new building for the San Martín, and work on the present building began on 24 June 1954.

The new building was inaugurated on 25 May 1960, but began operating the following year. It became one of the most influential cultural centers in Latin America. Its 30,000 m^{2} (320,000 sq ft), distributed among thirteen floors and four basements, includes three performance stages, several exhibition halls, and a cinema. Both the theater and adjacent cultural center were extensively renovated between 2010 and 2011.

During the World Chess Championship 1972, the final Candidates Match (to choose the challenger) was played in the theater between Bobby Fischer and Tigran Petrosian. Fischer won, and went on to defeat incumbent champion Boris Spassky. On 15 November 1980, the OTI Festival 1980 was held at the Martín Coronado Salon.

== Facilities ==
The theater has three halls for performing arts:

=== Martín Coronado Salon ===
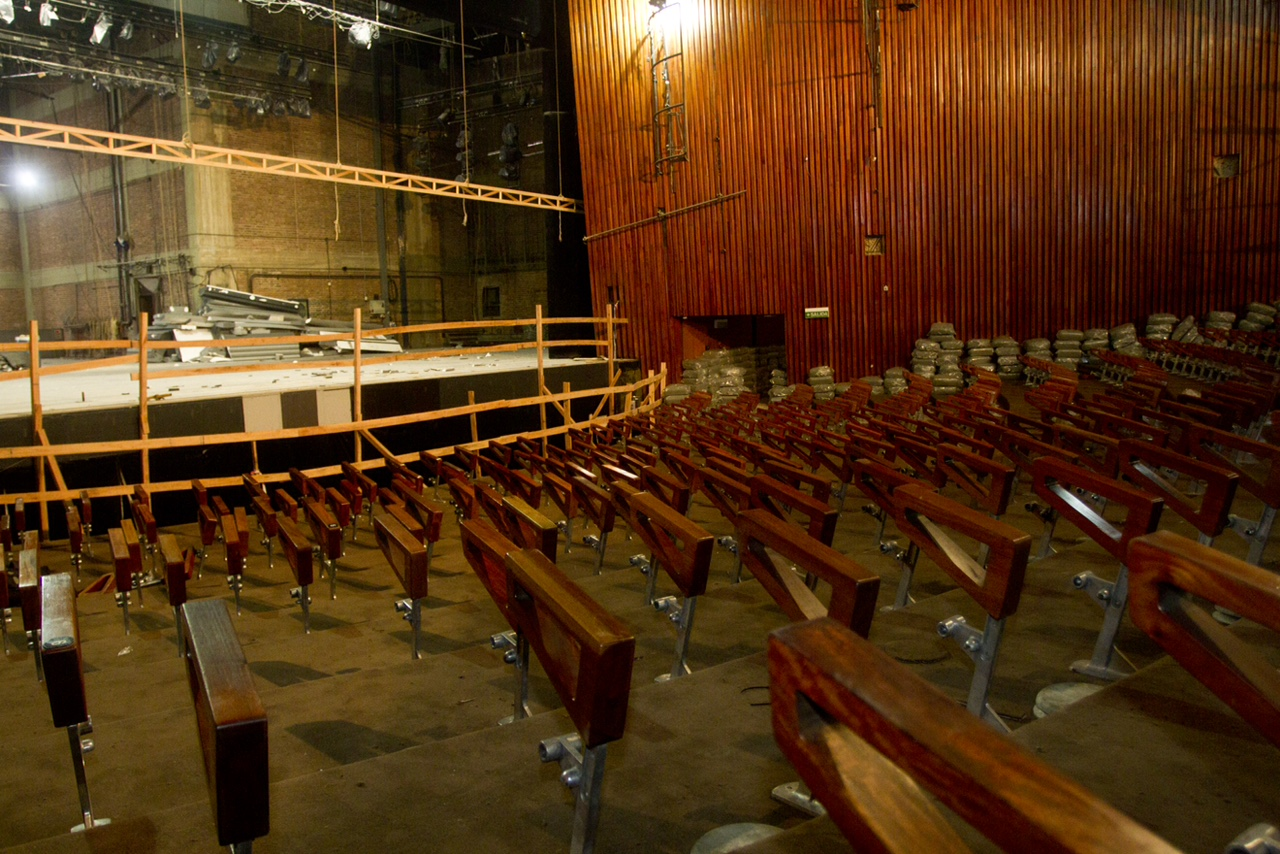
Marín Coronado Salon

The largest of the three rooms of the theater is the Martín Coronado, named in tribute to one of the pioneers of drama in Argentina. With its two-tiered stalls, it can accommodate 1,049 spectators.

The Italian-style stage is equipped with a mouth of variable sizes (between 11 and 16 metres (36 and 52 ft)) and has a center section that can move vertically, in whole or in part, through nine lifts operating simultaneously or separately. It includes an orchestra pit and a drawbridge to modern lighting and sound systems.

The ceiling of the Martín Coronado is decorated with a colored cement relief (4 by 2.50 metres (13.1 ft × 8.2 ft)) entitled Allegory to the Theater and completed in 1962 by local sculptor José Fioravanti. The walls are decorated with allegorical sculptures to drama and comedy, completed between 1957 and 1958 by local artist Pablo Curatella Manes.

=== Casacuberta Salon ===
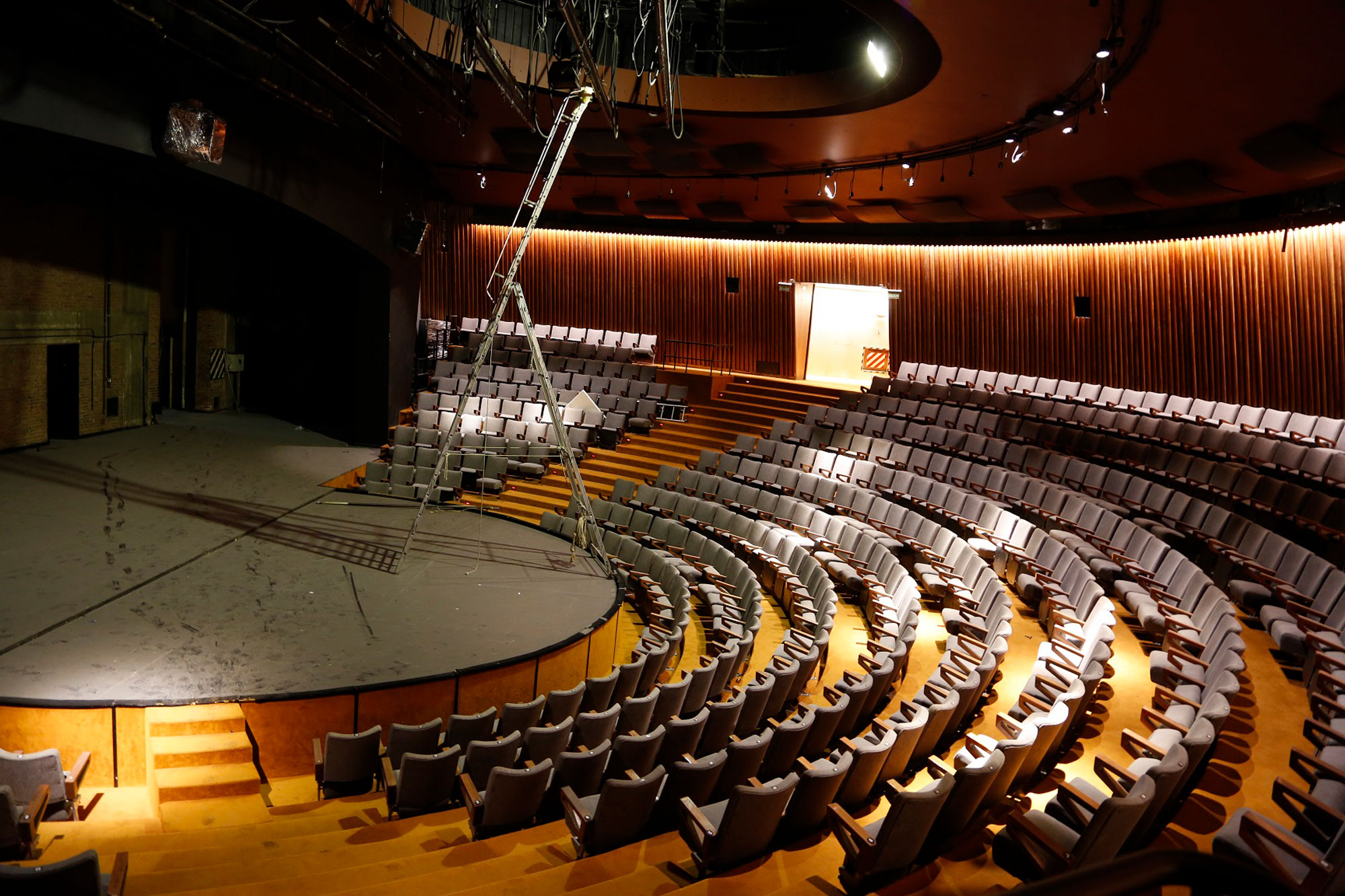
Casacuberta Salon, seating an audience of 566, is the San Martín's largest

The salon is named for Juan José de los Santos Casacuberta, the preeminent performer of the nineteenth century Argentine stage, and perhaps the first classically trained actor in local dramatic history. It can accommodate 566 persons and includes a semicircular orchestra divided into three radial sectors. A platform can be extended forward for a drawbridge scenario, or to raise the orchestra pit onto the stage, 35 m (115 ft) wide and 6 m (20 ft) deep.

The lobby of this salon is graced by a mural (35 by 11 m (115 by 36 ft)) by Luis Seoane, titled The Birth of the Argentine Theater, and completed in 1960, as well as allegorical terracotta reliefs by sculptor Carlos de la Cárcova and a steel sculpture (Continuity) by Enio Iommi.

=== Cunill Cabanellas Chamber ===
The center's third stage opened in 1979 at the initiative of Kive Staiff, then in his second season as general and artistic director of the Teatro San Martín, and was named in honor of prominent Catalan-Argentine stage director and instructor Antonio Cunill Cabanellas. Dedicated to experimental theatre, the capacity of the room (about 200 spectators) may vary with the movement and changes in the relationship between stage and pit, according to the requirements.

The hall is graced by a ceramic mural (1.65 by 1.65 m (5 ft 5 in by 5 ft 5 in)) in honor of the Podestá Brothers, by Luis Diego Pedreira. The original building opened in 1957 as the Teatro San Telmo; nearly destroyed by fire in 1970, it was incorporated to the Teatro San Martín in 1999.

== Gallery ==
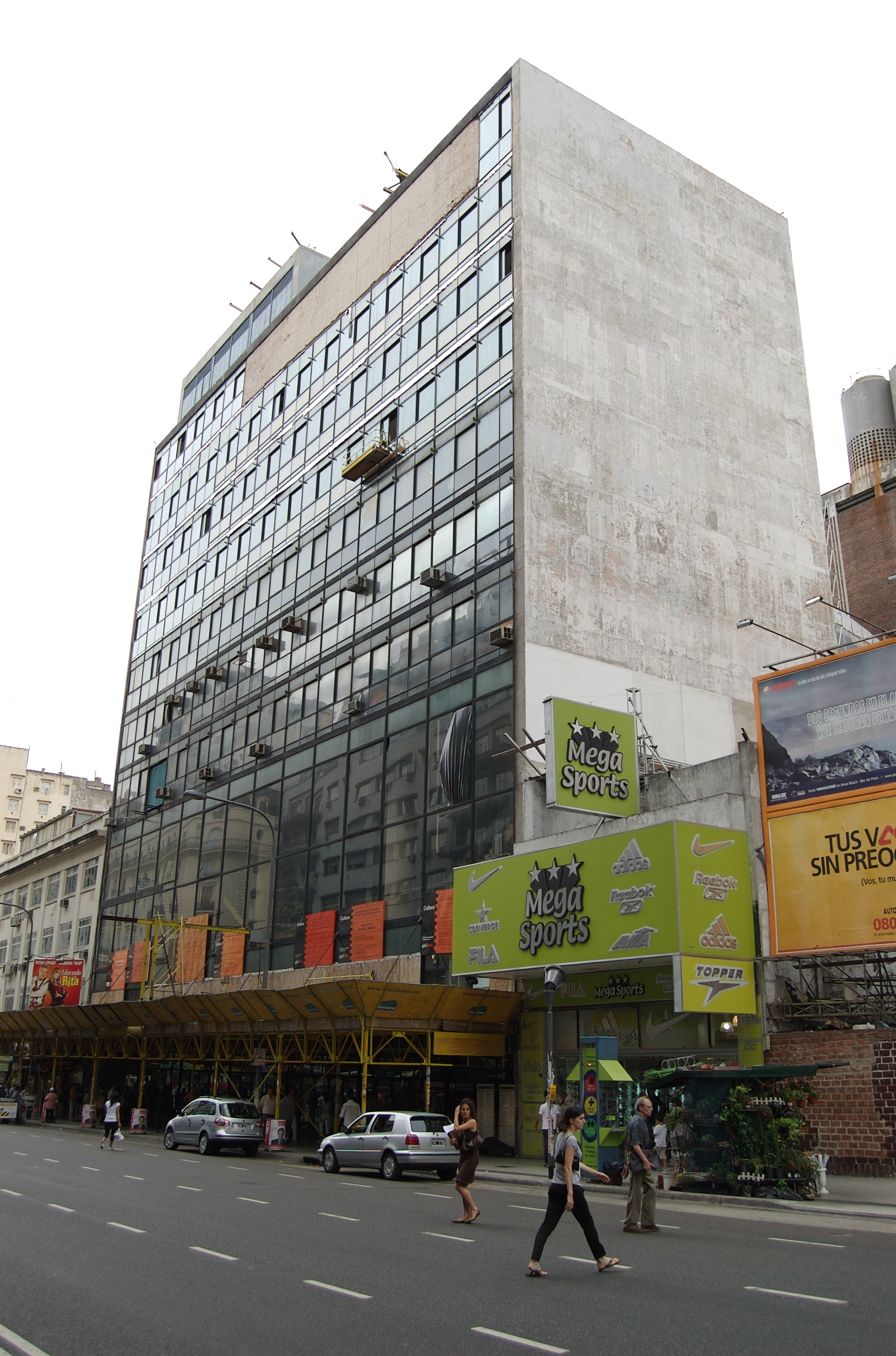

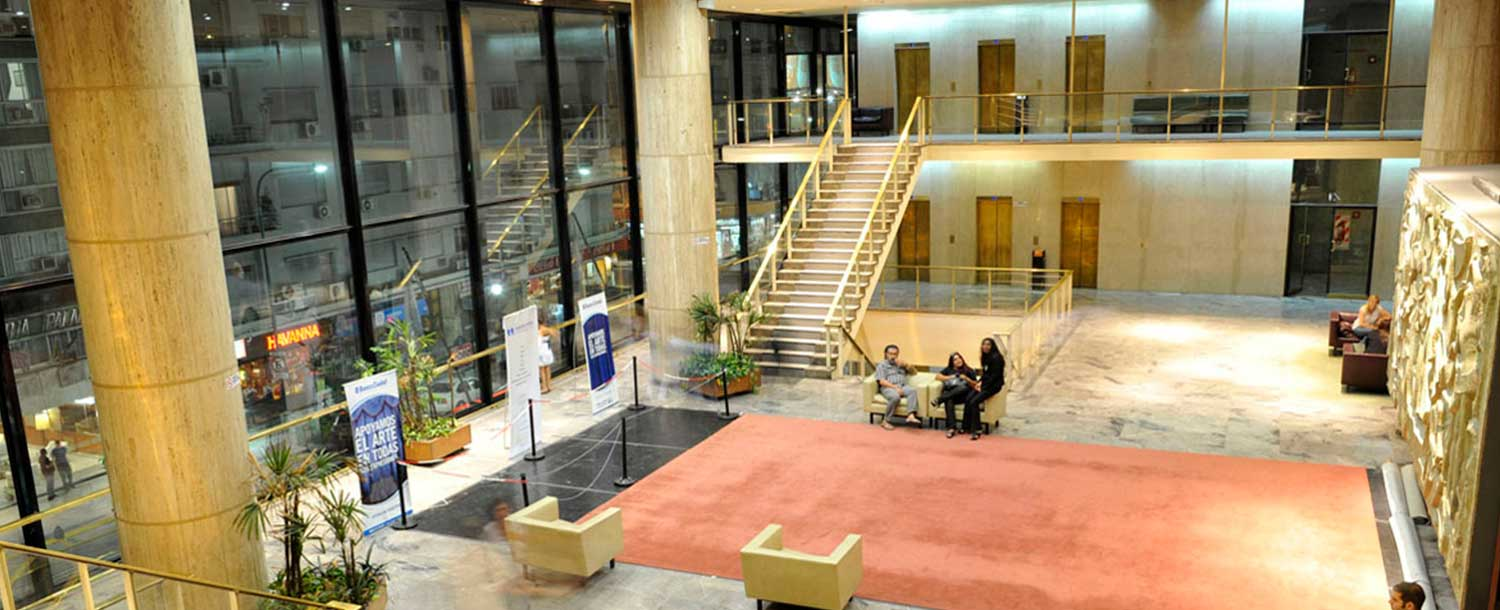

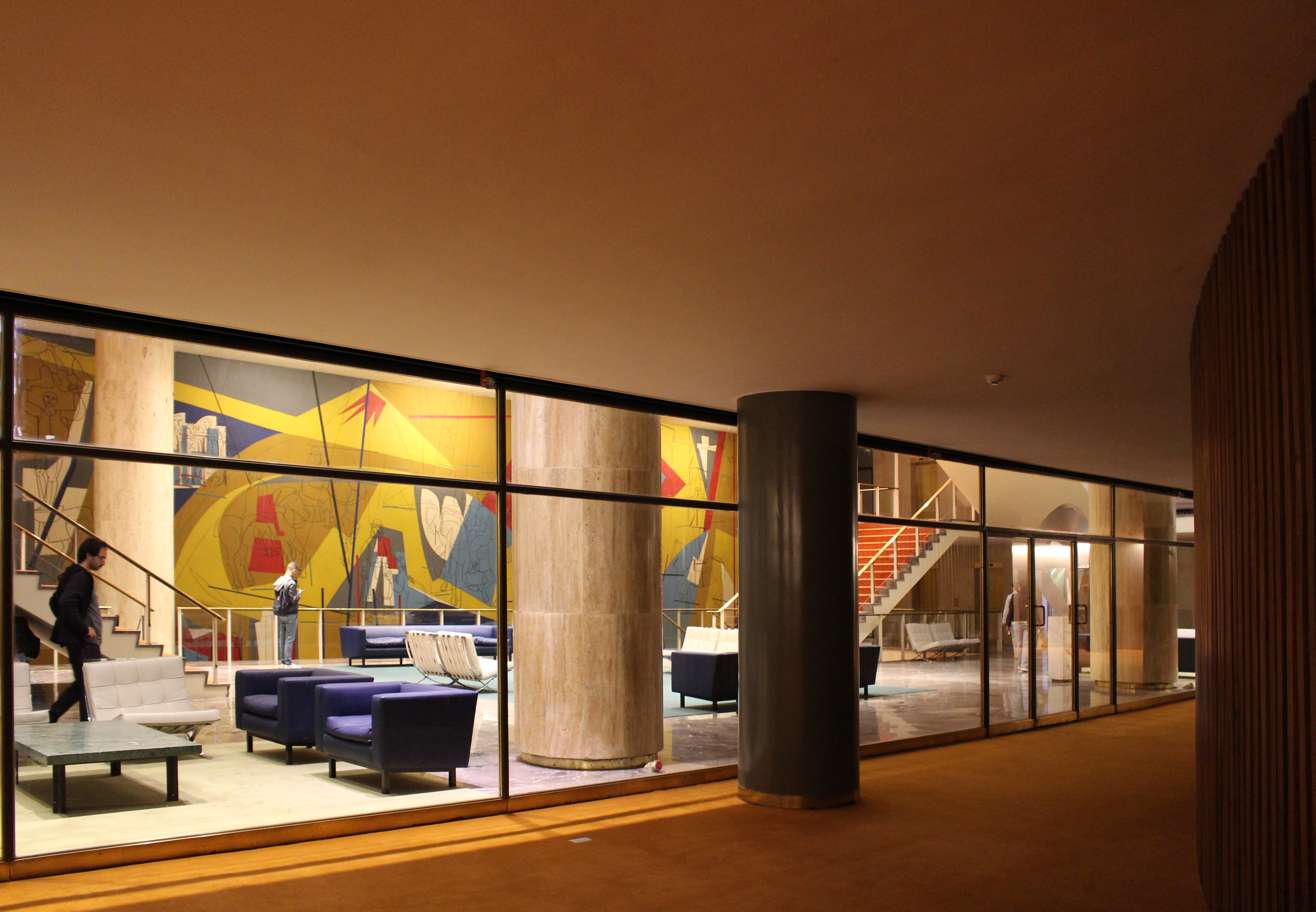

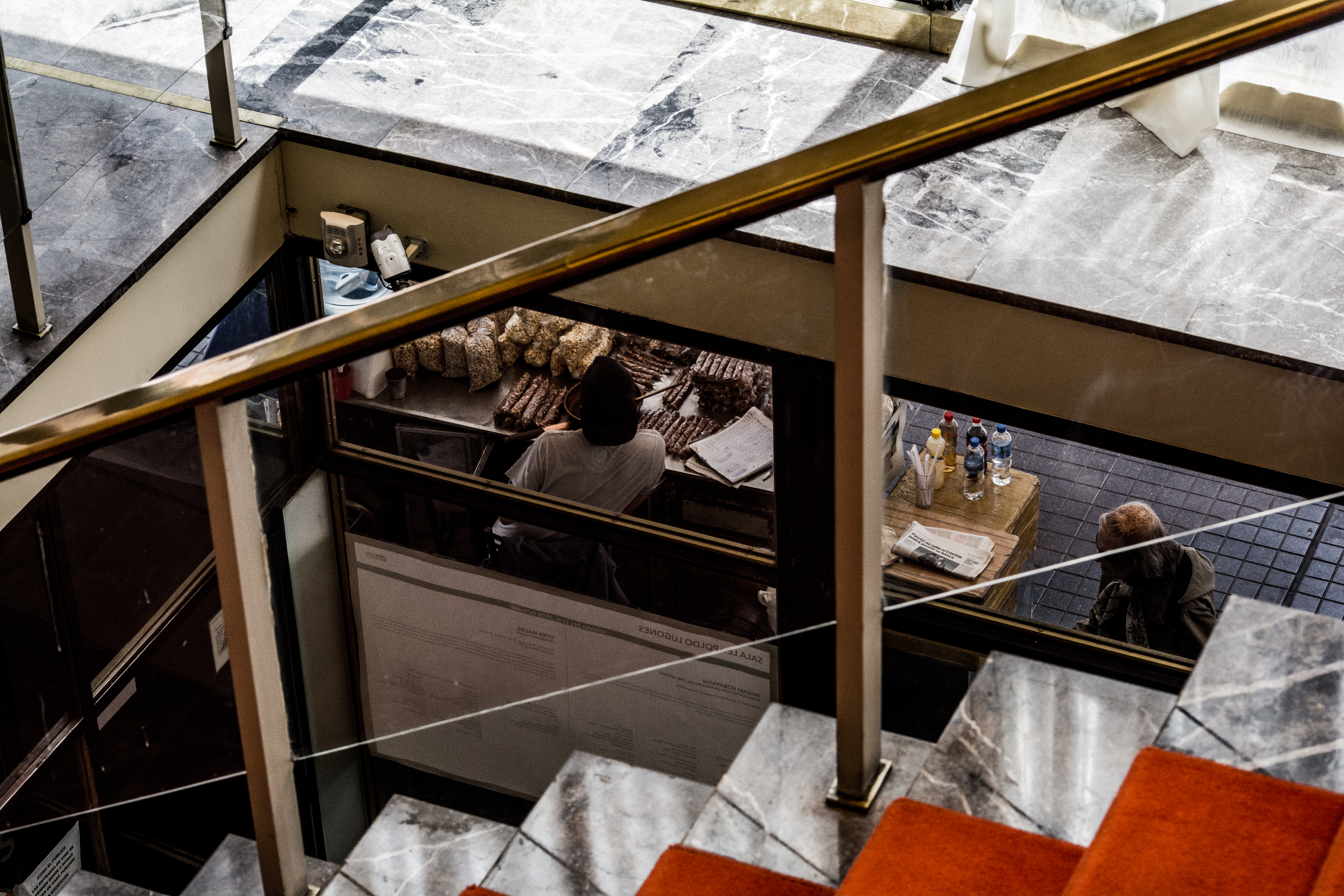

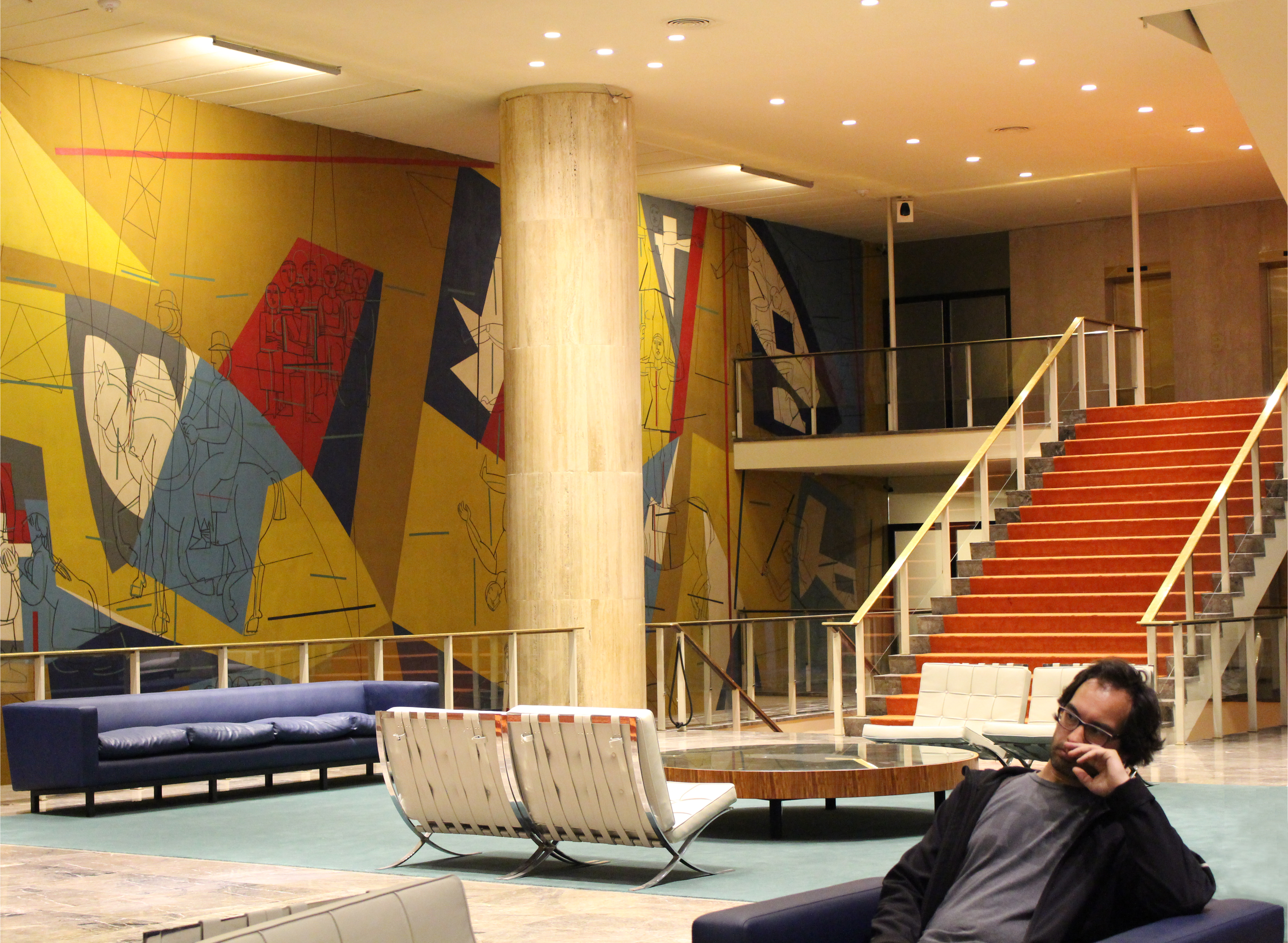
