= Centro Cultural General San Martín =

San Martín Cultural Centre
- Centro Cultural San Martín
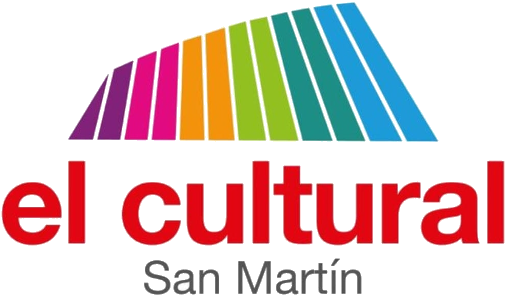

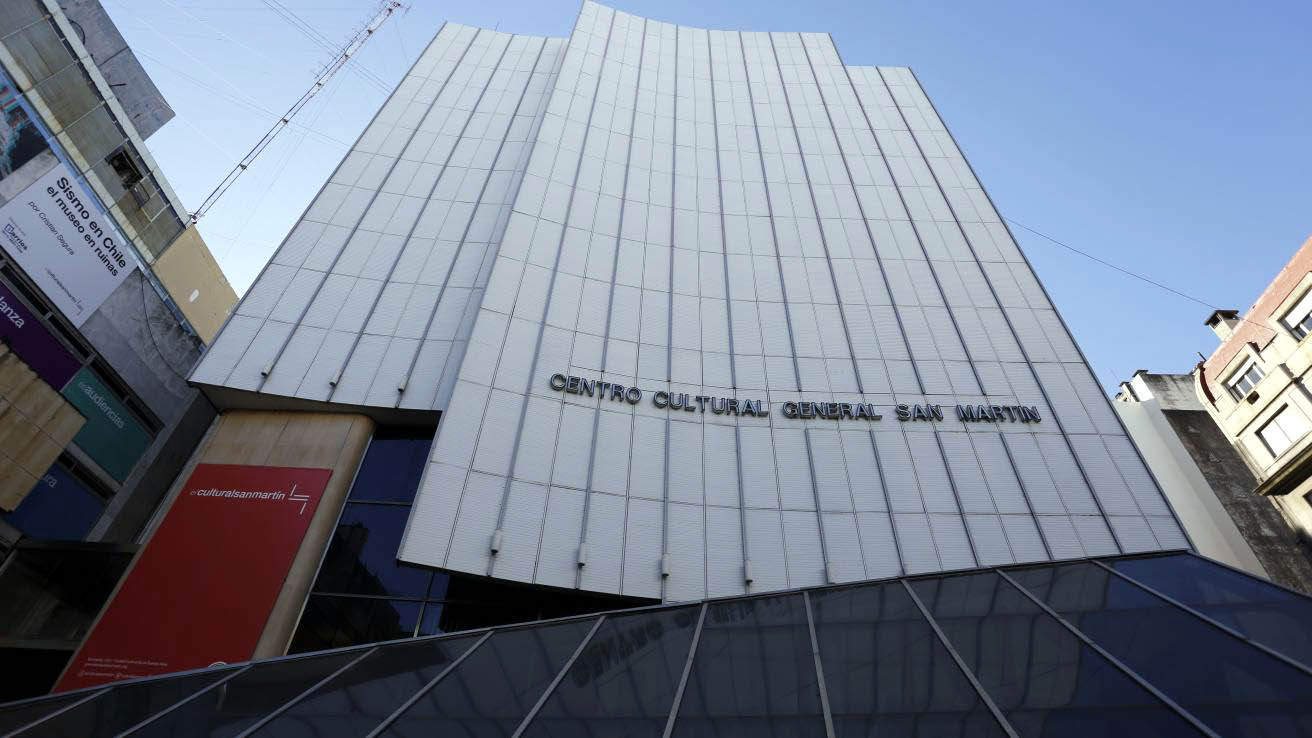
- Facade of the CCSM
- Interactive map of the San Martín Cultural Centre area

General information
- Location: Buenos Aires, Argentina, 1551 Sarmiento St., Buenos Aires
- Coordinates: 34°36′18.4″S 58°23′18″W
- Owner: City of Buenos Aires

Technical details
- Floor count: 12
- Floor area: 30,000 square metres (320,000 sq ft)

Design and construction
- Architect: Mario Roberto Álvarez

Website
- elculturalsanmartin.ar

The General San Martín Cultural Centre (Spanish: Centro Cultural General San Martín) is a cultural centre located in Buenos Aires, Argentina near the major thoroughfare Corrientes Avenue.

It is run by the city government, and hosts diverse cultural and artistic events. Adjacent to the theatre of the same name inaugurated in 1970 on Corrientes Avenue, the cultural center was designed by local architect Mario Roberto Álvarez, and was built between 1962 and 1973.

The center hosted the National Commission on the Disappeared (CONADEP) in 1984, as well as the first session of the Buenos Aires City Legislature following the devolution of autonomy to the city in 1996, and an extensive renovation began in 2007. Its annual theatre audiences of nearly 350,000 make it the largest public cultural center nationally, and with similar numbers at the privately operated Paseo La Plaza one block west, the 1500 block of Corrientes Avenue is arguably the leading center for the theatre in Latin America.

The cultural centre is named after General José de San Martín, leader of the Argentine War of Independence.

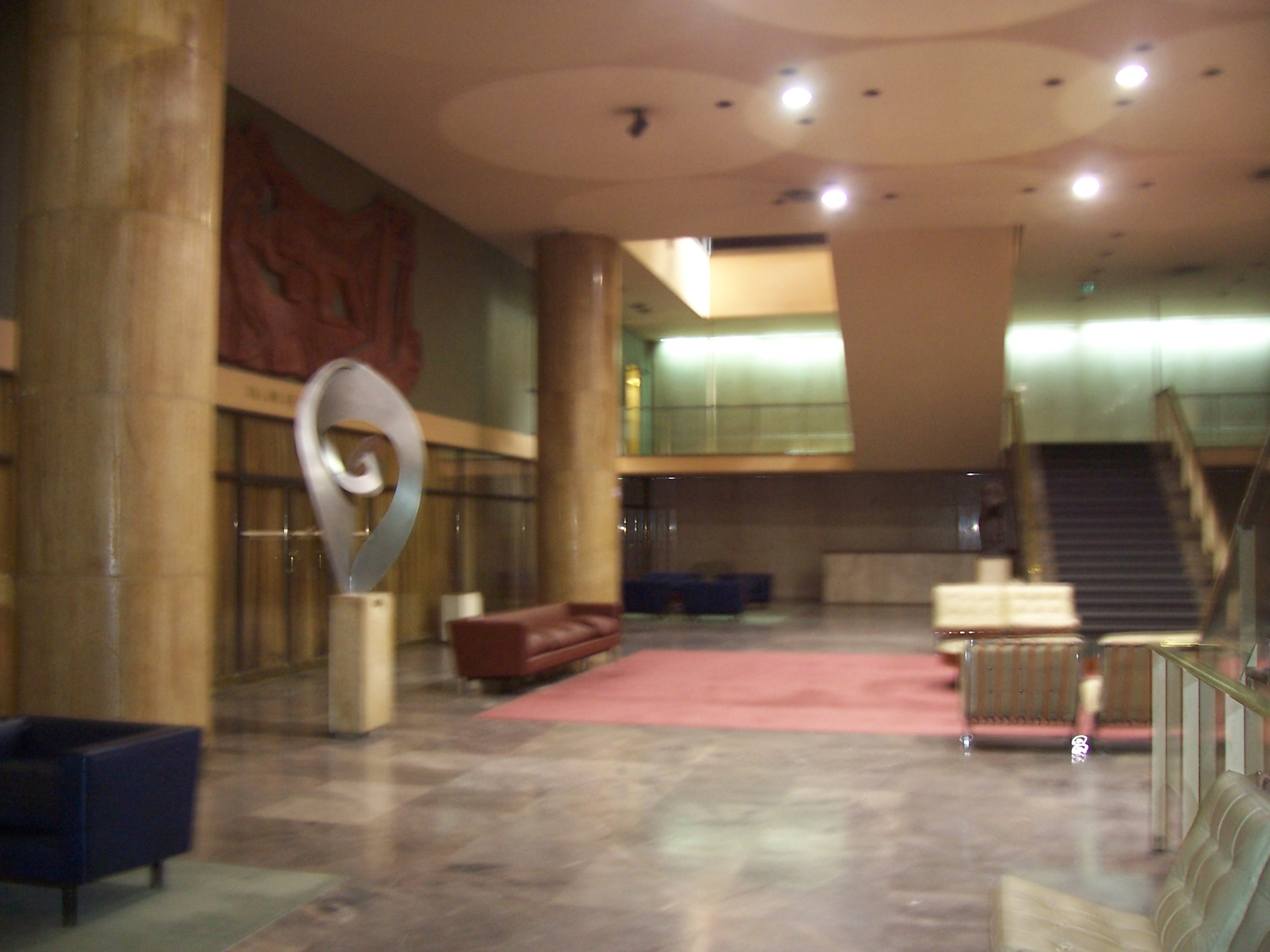
Lobby

The 30,000-square-metre (320,000 sq ft) building is spread over 12 floors and has different rooms for workshops and courses, including the Buenos Aires Audiovisual Nucleus with over 7,000 documentary works. The principal halls are:

- Sala Ernesto Bianco - 70 persons, dances
- Sala Enrique Muino - 254 persons, scenic arts
- Sala A/B - 750 persons
- Sala C - 200 persons
- Sala D - 200 persons
- Sala E - 200 persons
- Sala F - 200 persons
- Salón Madres de Plaza de Mayo, 150 persons, for use of Madres de Plaza de Mayo, and others.

At the eastern end of the building there are two small parks– the Plaza de las Américas and the Patio de Esculturas.
