= Carlos López Puccio =

Argentinian musician (born 1946)

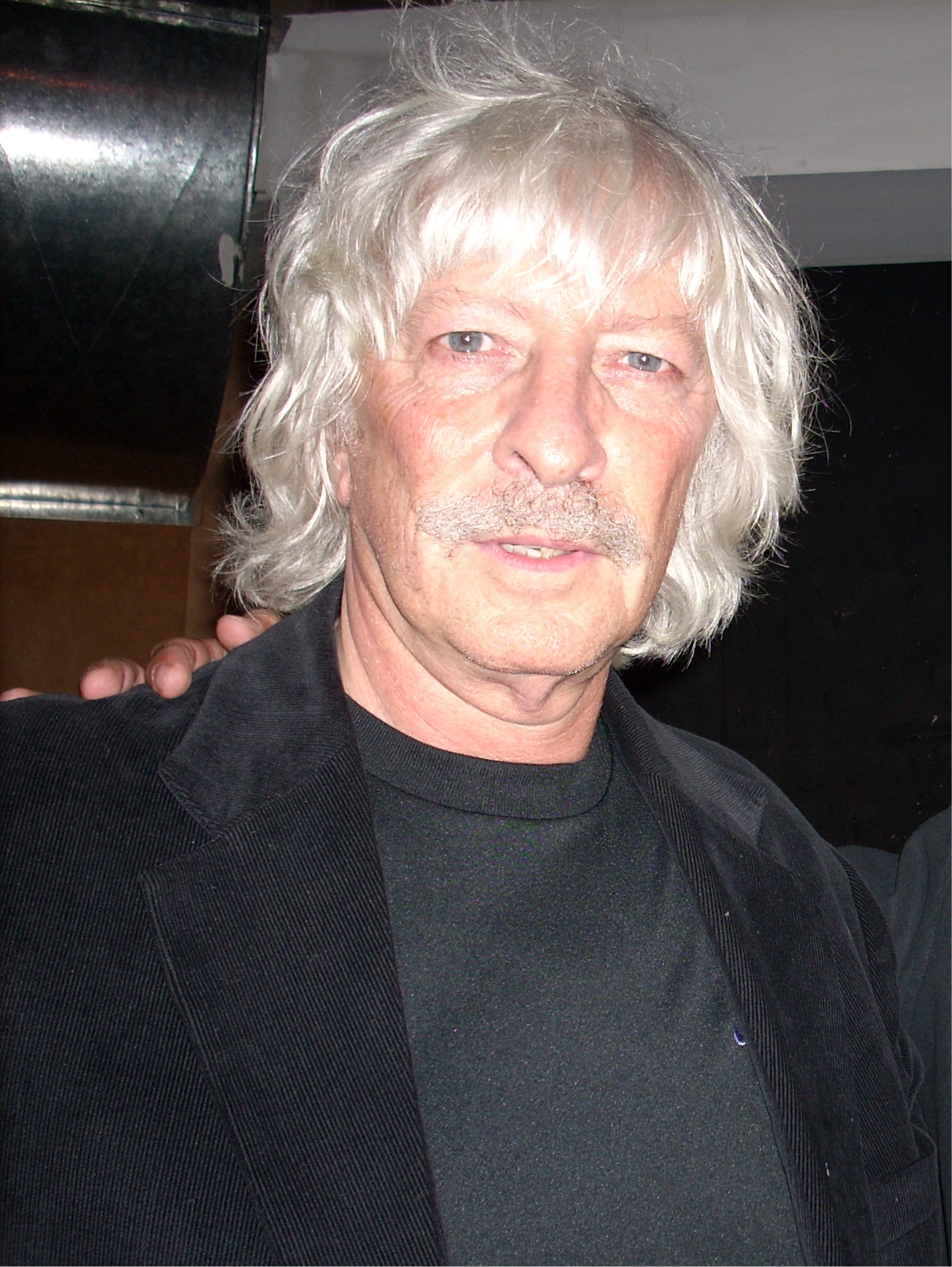
- Carlos López Puccio at Les Luthiers' 40th anniversary party
- Born: Carlos Alberto Daniel López Puccio; October 9, 1946 (age 80); Rosario, Santa Fe, Argentina

Carlos Alberto Daniel López Puccio (born 9 October 1946 in Rosario, Argentina) is an Argentinian multi-instrumentalist, orchestral and choral conductor, composer, singer, arranger and one of the current members of Les Luthiers.

After graduating from orchestral conducting in La Plata, he was hired by Les Luthiers to play the fiddlecan (a violin made of tuna can), and famously learnt the repertoire in two days (around 1970). For the next season, he started a songwriting partnership with Jorge Maronna, and they penned 'Pieza en Forma de Tango'; he also composed 'Voglio Entrare Per la Finestra' (with libretto by Marcos Mundstock) and around June 1971 he was invited to be a group member rather than a paid collaborator.

During the first years in Les Luthiers, López Puccio played other instruments such as cello, viola and percussion, and he often provided backing vocals. He also composed music for many pieces for the group, including 'Concierto de Mpkstroff' (which features group-mate Carlos Núñez Cortés as soloist) and 'Brotan und Gretchen'. He slowly gained notoriety scripting jokes for his groupmates as well as occasional song lyrics.

From 1979 onwards he also played piano, synthesizer and harmonica for several musical pieces, especially since Ernesto Acher left the group, and they started including electronic keyboards more often. He also became more and more involved as an actor, having several starring parts from the 80's onwards.

He sang some of the songs that he composed with Maronna, such as Solo Necesitamos. His ability to maintain a falsetto when singing allowed him to play female roles such as princesses, which he alternated with those of political or military leaders.

== Compositions for Les Luthiers ==
- Bolero de Mastropiero (with Maronna).
- Cantata del adelantado Don Rodrigo Díaz de Carreras (with Ernesto Acher and Jorge Maronna).
- Concierto de Mpkstroff (with some input from Núñez).
- Marcha de la conquista (with Maronna & Acher).
- Pieza en Forma de Tango (with Maronna).
- Serenata Mariachi (with Maronna & Mundstock).
- Si no fuera santiagueño (with Acher, Mundstock & Maronna).
- Voglio entrare per la finestra (music).

== Performances ==
- Backing Vocals:
  - Añoralgias (post-1986 versions)
  - Bolero de los celos
  - Bolero de Mastropiero
  - Cantata del adelantado Don Rodrigo Díaz de Carreras
  - Cartas de color
  - Educación sexual moderna
  - El explicado
  - El negro quiere bailar
  - Fuga en Si-beria
  - La gallina dijo eureka
  - La hija de Escipión
  - La tanda
  - La vida es hermosa
  - Lazy Daisy
  - Marcha de la conquista
  - Oi Gadóñaya
  - Romance del joven conde, la sirena y el pájaro cucú. Y la oveja
  - San Ictícola de los peces
  - Si no fuera santiagueño
  - Somos adolescentes mi pequeña
  - Teorema de Thales
  - Visita a la universidad de Wildstone
- Bass guitar:
  - Bolero de los celos
  - Cantata del adelantado Don Rodrigo Díaz de Carreras
  - Perdónala
- Contraguitarrone da gamba (hybrid of viola and acoustic guitar):
  - Bolero de Mastropiero (1971 version)
- drums:
  - Cartas de color
  - Manuel Darío
  - Miss Lilly Higgins sings shimmy in Mississippi's spring (Shimmy)
  - Pepper Clemens sent the messenger: nevertheless the reverend left the herd (Ten step) (original versions)
- Harmonica:
  - Balada del séptimo regimiento
  - Cartas de color
  - Lo que el sheriff se contó
  - Manuel Darío
  - Sólo necesitamos
- Harmonium:
  - La tanda
- Kazoo:
  - Concierto de Mpkstroff
  - El asesino misterioso
  - Marcha de la conquista
  - San Ictícola de los peces
- Latín (violin made of a tin can):
  - Canción para moverse
  - Concierto de Mpkstroff (non-symphonic versions)
  - Cuarteto op. 44
  - El beso de Ariadna
  - Encuentro en el restaurante
  - Enteteniciencia familiar
  - Iniciación a las artes marciales
  - La bella y graciosa moza
  - La hora de la nostalgia
  - La vida es hermosa
  - Para Elisabeth
  - Pepper Clemens sent the messenger: nevertheless the reverend left the herd (Ten step) (post-Acher versions)
  - Pieza en forma de tango
  - Serenata medio oriental
  - Serenata tímida
  - Sinfonia interrumpida
  - Sonatas para latín y piano
  - Una canción regia
  - Vea esta noche
  - Visita a la universidad de Wildstone
- Bombo legüero:
  - El regreso del indio
  - El valor de la unidad
- Latin Percussion:
  - Cantata del adelantado Don Rodrigo Díaz de Carreras
- Lead Vocals:
  - Bolero de los celos (one verse)
  - Educación sexual moderna (one verse)
  - El poeta y el eco (with Jorge Maronna)
  - El regreso del indio (ending)
  - El valor de la unidad (part)
  - La vida es hermosa (part)
  - Los jóvenes de hoy en día (with Jorge Maronna)
  - Sólo necesitamos (with Jorge Maronna)
  - Una canción regia (with Jorge Maronna)
- Maracas:
  - Cartas de color
  - La redención del vampiro
- Piano:
  - Cantata del adelantado Don Rodrigo Díaz de Carreras (post-Acher versions)
  - La campana suonerà
  - Las majas del bergantín ('81 and '86 versions)
  - Pepper Clemens sent the messenger: nevertheless the reverend left the herd (Ten step) (post-Acher versions)
- Special Effects:
  - El asesino misterioso (shoe-steps, screams)
- Synthesizer:
  - A la playa con Mariana
  - Daniel y el Señor
  - El sendero de Warren Sánchez
  - Fly Airways
  - Fronteras de la ciencia
  - Homenaje a Huesito Williams
  - La hija de Escipión
  - La hora de la nostalgia
  - Serenata intimidatoria
- Triangle:
  - El asesino misterioso
- Viola:
  - La princesa caprichosa
