= Masana =

Masana is a surname. Notable people with the surname include:

- Javier Masana (born 1941), Spanish alpine skier
- Gerardo Masana (1937–1973), Argentine musician

== Other uses ==
- Ninth Sister, also known as Masana Tide, a Imperial Inquisitor, character and antagonist in the 2019 video game Star Wars Jedi: Fallen Order

== See also ==
- Masana language
- Bokuzō Masana
- Masana Miyamoto
