= Samper =

Samper may refer to:

- Samper (surname)
- Samper de Calanda, a town in the province of Teruel, Aragon
- Samper del Salz, a town in the province of Zaragoza, Aragon
