= Maronna =

Maronna is an Italian surname. Notable people with the surname include:

- Jorge Maronna (born 1948), Argentine musician
- Mike Maronna (born 1977), American actor
