= Luth =

Luth, Lüth or LUTH may refer to:

== People ==
- Erich Lüth (1902–1989), German writer and film director.
- Tom Luth (born 1954), comic series colorist
- Wolfgang Lüth (1913–1945), German U-boat commander of World War II.

== Other uses ==
- Leatherback sea turtle
- Luth Enchantee (foaled 1980), French Thoroughbred racehorse
- Lagos University Teaching Hospital, located in Idi-Araba, Surulere, Lagos State, Nigeria
- Tabung Haji, formerly known as Lembaga Urusan dan Tabung Haji
- Lute, musical instrument, from French usage

== See also ==
- Luther (disambiguation)
- Luthier (disambiguation)
