= Samper (surname) =

Samper is a surname. Notable people with the surname include:

- Bernardo Samper, a Colombian squash player
- Cristián Samper, a Colombian-American biologist and museum administrator
- Daniel Samper Pizano, a Colombian lawyer and writer, brother of Ernesto Samper
- Daniel Samper Ospina, a Colombian comedian and journalist, son of Daniel Samper Pizano
- Ernesto Samper, a Colombian politician
- José María Dols Samper (maternal surname), a Spanish bullfighter
- Juan Felipe Samper, a Colombian musician
- Max Samper, a French footballer
- Ricardo Samper, a Spanish political figure during the Second Spanish Republic
- Sergi Samper, a Spanish football player
