= Luthier (disambiguation) =

A luthier is someone who makes or repairs lutes and other string instruments.

Luthier may also refer to:

- Luthier (horse), a French thoroughbred racehorse
- Les Luthiers, an Argentine comedy-musical group
  - Les Luthiers, Grandes Hitos, greatest hits show
  - Les Luthiers (volumen 3), comedy album
  - Les Luthiers (volumen 4), comedy album
  - Les Luthiers (volumen 7), comedy album
- Luthier, the older brother of Dyute and the playable character from Fire Emblem Gaiden
