= Mastropiero =

Mastropiero can refer to:

- Orio Mastropiero, (d. 13 June 1192), Venetian statesman
- Johann Sebastian Mastropiero, fictional composer created by the Argentine comedy-musical group Les Luthiers
- Mastropiero que nunca, theatrical humour/music show by Les Luthiers.
