= Gerardo Masana =

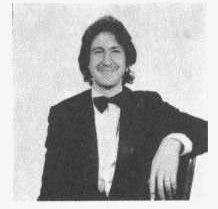
- Born: February 1, 1937; Banfield, Argentina
- Died: November 11, 1973 (aged 36)
- Occupation: founder of comedy-musical group

Gerardo Masana (February 1, 1937 – November 11, 1973) Argentine founder of comedy-musical group Les Luthiers in 1965. Masana died of leukemia eight years later, on November 11, 1973. The other members of Les Luthiers remained together until Daniel Rabinovich died in 2015, as of 2017 they still perform live in tours through Latin America and Spain.
