= Matófono =

South American membranophone

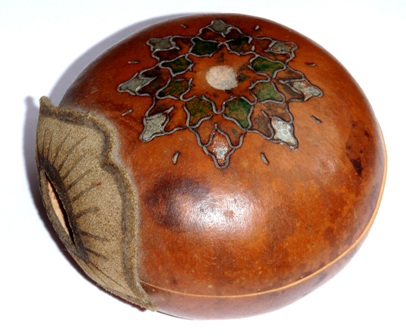
The matófono in modern use.

The matófono or galleta is a traditional mirliton-type musical instrument from Argentina and Uruguay. It consists of a gourd used for mate, split into two halves and held together with thread or a piece of leather attached as a mouthpiece.

== Popularization by Les Luthiers ==
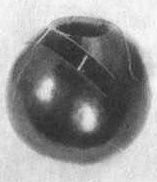
Matófono used by Les Luthiers.

The galleta was recreated in the 1960s by the Buenos Aires luthier Carlos Iraldi for the comedic informal instrument ensemble Les Luthiers and renamed yerbomatófono d’amore or simply yerbomatófono. This instrument was made from mate gourds cut in half, sanded, and reassembled, with an opening for the player's lips. The sound is amplified and distorted in a unique way, with a timbre that varies based on the pressure applied.

Unlike the kazoo, which has a similar timbre, the matófono requires one hand to hold it, whereas the kazoo can be played while using both hands for another instrument.
