= Les Luthiers, Grandes Hitos =

Album by Les Luthiers

Les Luthiers, Grandes Hitos (Les Luthiers: Greatest Hits – An Anthology) was a show performed by the Argentinian comedy group Les Luthiers.

== The show ==
The show officially premiered on May 7, 1992. It is a compilation of some of the group's best works from throughout their career. The show ended in 1996.

=== Program ===
- El Sendero de Warren Sánchez – Salmos sectarios, 1987 ("The Path of Warren Sanchez – Sectarian Psalms")

The first act in the program is a parody of modern religious groups. The act begins with the mockery of subjects like sins, the devil and self-help programs.

- Serenata Medio Oriental – Música Medio Árabe, 1983 ("Half-Oriental Serenade", which can also be interpreted as "Middle Eastern Serenade")

The second act in the program, it begins with an introduction which refers humorously to oriental subjects, and then segues into a parody of oriental music and the Arabic custom of having multiple lovers and wives.

- Kathy, la Reina del Saloon – Música de cine mudo, 1977 ("Kathy, the Queen of the Saloon – Music from the Silent Movies")

The third act of the program is a parody of the silent movie era. It begins with the group recounting the plot of a silent movie, and ends with humorous consequences.

- Encuentro en el Restaurante – Rapsodía gastronómica, 1987 ("Encounter at the Restaurant – Gastronomic Rhapsody")

The fourth act in the program is set at a restaurant. A person talks to a woman he has met and forgives himself for what he has done to her. The restaurant staff starts pestering him, and at the end it is later discovered that he was rehearsing before he actually talked to the woman.

- Canción para Moverse – Canción infantil, 1979 ("The Movement Song – A Children's Song")

The fifth act in the program is a parody of child psychologists and the songs that are made specially for babies and children to help motor skills. It ends with near-impossible movements that can be practiced (the presenter ends up entangled with his own body).

- Entreteniciencia Familiar – Musica de Cámara de TV, 1983 ("Family Entertainment – TV Chamber Music" (which can also be interpreted as "TV Camera Music")

The sixth act in the program is a parody of family entertainment programs. It mocks the attitude of show's host when he brings on a group that plays Chamber Music (classical music) instead of the planned Tropical music band.

- Lazy Daisy – Hall Music, 1977 ("Lazy Daisy")

The seventh act in the program pokes fun at the Music Hall groups of the past, and ends with accidents caused by the singers' rivalry.

- Las Majas del Bergantín – Zarzuela Náutica, 1981

The eighth act in the program is about Spanish pirates and opera pieces. It starts with a group of all-male sailors transporting female pirate prisoners who are to be handed over to the Spanish government. They fall in love and sadly have to give them back to the pirates.

- La Hora de la Nostalgia – Diez minutos de recuerdos, 1989 ("The Nostalgic Hour – Ten Minutes of Memories")

The closing act is a parody of nostalgic interview shows. They invite an elderly singer who can barely remember what he did in his life, and who doesn't understand most of the questions.
