= Ernesto Acher =

Argentine comedian and actor (1939–2025)

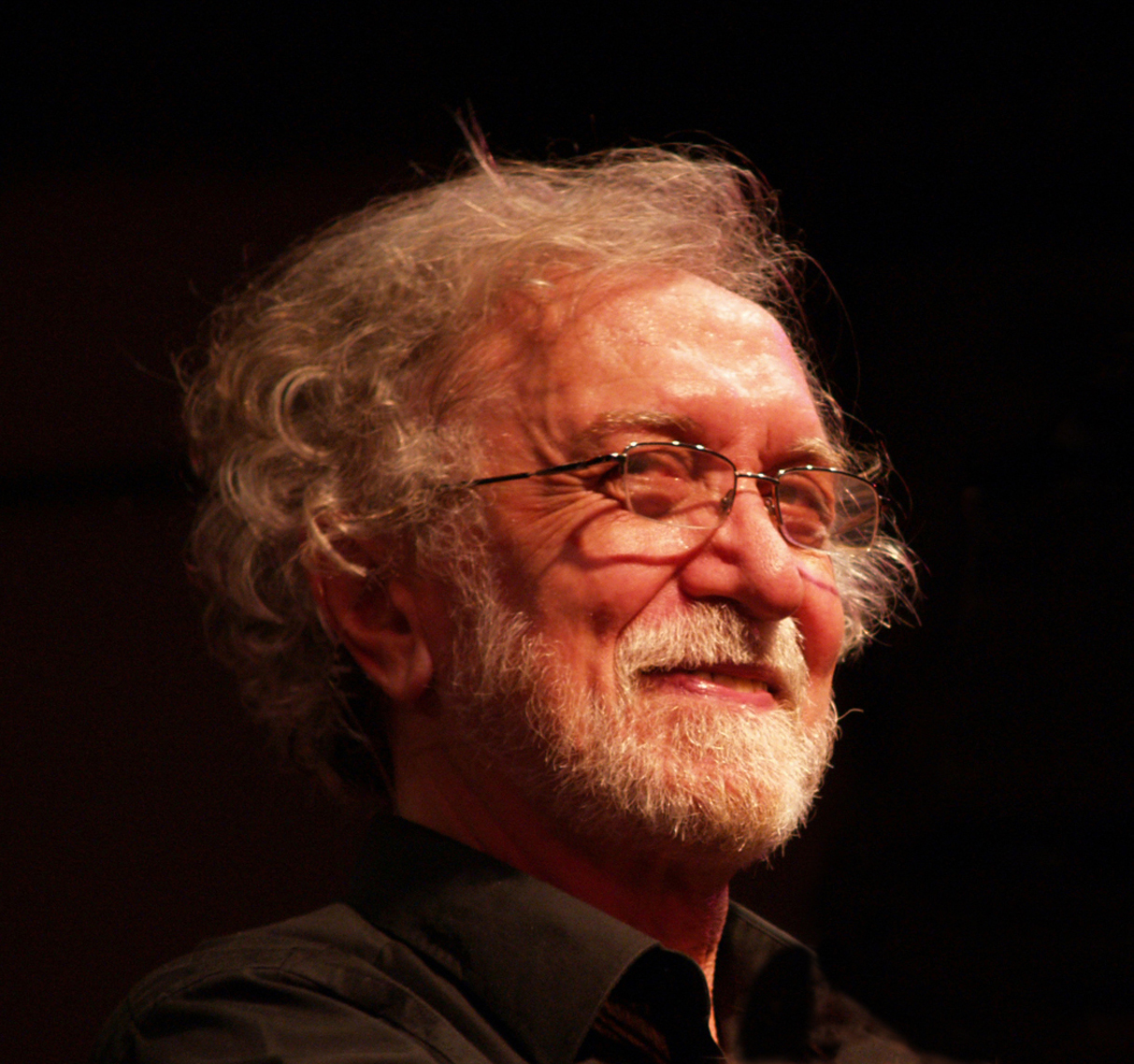
- Born: October 9, 1939; Buenos Aires, Argentina
- Died: December 12, 2025 (aged 86)
- Education: University of Buenos Aires
- Occupations: Comedian; actor; composer; arranger; conductor

Ernesto Acher (October 9, 1939 – December 12, 2025) was an Argentine comedian, actor, composer, arranger, multi-instrumentalist and orchestral conductor. Between 1971 and 1986, he was a member of the celebrated Argentine group Les Luthiers, with which he acted as composer, comedian, singer, and performer on more than twenty instruments, some of which he created himself. Before separating from the group, he was involved in individual projects as a composer – including a soundtrack, a quartet for clarinet and strings, a string sextet and a symphonic poem for viola and orchestra. In 1988, he founded the La Banda Elástica (The Elastic Band), gathering some of the most outstanding Argentine jazz musicians. The band dissolved in 1993. Since then, he has developed several musical and comedy projects and performed as an orchestral conductor.

== Background ==
Acher was born in Buenos Aires, Argentina on October 9, 1939. He was Jewish. Acher died on December 12, 2025, at the age of 86.

== Training and career ==
As a child, he studied piano and, in his teens, became interested in the clarinet and jazz. In 1965, he graduated as an architect from the University of Buenos Aires's Architecture and Urbanism School, where he worked also as a teacher on special-structures design. In parallel, he continued his musical studies with Professor Erwin Leuchter. In January 1971, he put architecture aside and devoted himself to music. During the following years, he resumed musical studies with José Maranzano, and quite later he took up orchestral conducting with Carlos Calleja.

== Les Luthiers ==
In March 1971, he became a member of Les Luthiers, replacing Marcos Mundstock as presenter as well as performer on several both formal and informal instruments. As a composer, his first work for the group was a jazz piece for informal instruments: Tristezas del Manuela (Manuela´s Blues). Upon Mundstock's return in 1972, Acher was asked to stay as actor, composer, arranger and multi-instrumentist. He was the motor behind the group's collective format, and in the use of amplification with a view to the new, larger venues in which they were eventually to play. Through his friend Alfredo Radoszynski, who at the time headed the legendary Trova recording label, Acher promoted the group's recording activity as a means to reach larger audiences. Some of his works are: a cycle of jazz pieces with single-vowel titles (a joint idea with Carlos Núñez Cortés), Miss Lilly Higgins, Bob Gordon, Papa Garland, Pepper Clemens and Truthful Lulu; his folk pieces La yegua mía, Añoralgias and Epopeya de los quince jinetes; Teresa y el Oso (Theresa and the Bear), a symphonic poem for narrator and the informal-instruments ensemble, parodying Prokofiev's Peter and the Wolf, and transcribed in 1976 for narrator, informal instruments and symphonic orchestra; Quartet Op. 44 for five players, and the Cantata de Don Rodrigo, in cooperation with Jorge Maronna and Carlos López Puccio. His most celebrated main roles are that of Don Rodrigo in the Cantata, the king in El rey enamorado (The lovesick king), and the “little brat” in La gallina dijo Eureka (Eureka, said the hen). The instruments designed and built by Acher include the “valve gom-horn”, the “gom-horn da testa” and the “kalephone”. He also collaborated with Núñez Cortés in the “glamocot” (which can be heard inTheresa and the Bear) and the “clamaneus”, which has never been introduced, and with Carlos Iraldi in designing Antenor, the musical robot in the 1979 show Muchas gracias de nada (Much ado with nothing at all). On top of his talents as composer, arranger and his remarkable ability at different instruments, such as clarinet, bass clarinet, French horn, trombone, piano, accordion, drums and other percussion instruments, plus half a dozen of assorted informal instruments, he was quite expert in approaching different genres and styles. Besides his activity with Les Luthiers, he composed the soundtrack for Carlos Jerusalinsky's medium-length film Caja de sorpresas (Jack-in-the-box), based on a short story by Ray Bradbury, which received several awards at the 1976 Uncipar Festival, and had his String Sextet performed at the 1978 Contemporary Music Festival at Santiago, Chile, as well as Molloy, a symphonic poem for viola and orchestra, with soloist Marcela Magín and the Buenos Aires Philharmonic under maestro Pedro I. Calderón, in 1980. After his extensive stint with Les Luthiers, he quit the group for reasons that have remained unclear. Acher's diplomatic explanation is that “Les Luthiers is a multiple marriage, and gentlemen do not ask spouses what went on in their marriage.”

== The Elastic Band ==
In early 1988, Acher brought together some of the best Argentine jazz musicians in La Banda Elástica (The Elastic Band). Its members included Carlos Costantini (trumpet, flugelhorn, keyboards, bass, vocals, composing and arrangements), Hugo Pierre (alto & soprano saxophone, clarinet), Enrique Varela (tenor & soprano sax, clarinet, vocals); Ernesto Acher (trombone, baritone sax, clarinet, bass clarinet, French horn, piano, vocals, composing and arrangements), Jorge Navarro (piano, keyboards, percussion, vibraphone, vocals), Ricardo Lew (guitars, bass, percussion, composition and arrangements); Juan Amaral (bass, guitar, vocals), Enrique Roizner (drums, percussion). The group's idea was to approach all genres, from jazz to Argentine folk songs, with both physical and musical humour, and a certain jazzy flavour, which led famous trombone player (and chef) Christian Kellens to assert that "What you do is like a ministry, ´cause you do jazz all the time, and people enjoy it without perhaps realizing". Another important feature is that the players´ multiple abilities enabled them to approach nearly any given genre from different instrument combinations. Their first performance, in June 1988, at the Cervantes Theatre, Buenos Aires, was widely acclaimed by audience and critics alike. It was followed by greatly successful seasons in Buenos Aires (Blanca Podestá, Lorange, and del Globo Theatres), and Mar del Plata (Las Estrellas and Colón Theatres), Then came three recordings and a chockfull of awards, plus performances in other Argentine cities, Montevideo (Uruguay), São Paulo (Brazil), and Asunción (Paraguay). In 1991 Acher conceived and organised a show called Together in concert, with The Elastic Band and Camerata Bariloche, Argentina's most celebrated chamber ensemble. It was a resounding success at the Opera Theatre and Luna Park. The group disbanded in 1993.

== Other projects ==
Later in 1993, Acher performed for the first time as a stand-up comedian in Humor, con Acher (Humour with Acher); he also presented his radio programme Los rincones de Acher (Acher´s corners) over FM Del Plata, later over Radio Clásica, FM Palermo, and a few years after that over Radio Universidad de Concepción (Concepción, Chile) and Radio Universidad de Chile (Santiago, Chile). Also that year, he performed the first version of his Veladas espeluznantes (Creepy soirées), combining repertoire works with musical jokes, conducting the Rosario Symphony Orchestra, Argentina, with the participation his friends Daniel Schapiro and Carlos Núñez Cortés for the occasion. New versions were performed in Córdoba, Mendoza, Rosario, Bahía Blanca (Argentina) and Concepción, Santiago and Antofagasta (Chile). In 1995, Acher founded the "Offside Chamber Orchestra", a miniature (23 member) symphonic ensemble specialising in a variegated repertoire, from musical jokes to regular symphonic pieces in reduced arrangements. He participated in countless private events and during a season at the then reopened Lassalle Theatre, Buenos Aires.

In 1997, together with his friends, and most celebrated jazz pianists, Jorge Navarro and Rubén “Baby” López Furst, he presented Gershwin, el hombre que amamos (Gershwin, the man we love), with arrangements by himself and López Furst; the show combined the piano duo of Navarro-López Furst with a symphony orchestra, pairing the highest symphonic jazz standards. After two initial presentations at the Avenida Theatre in Buenos Aires in early October, the show stayed on through the end of November, to be repeated the following years in Buenos Aires, Córdoba, Santa Fe and Mar del Plata (Argentina) and São Paulo (Brazil). It ended abruptly in July 2000 with López Furst's death, which precluded an eventual performance in Los Angeles (USA) with the American Jazz Philharmonic. In 1998 Polygram issued a live recording of the 1997 concert, whilst in September 2010 an album was released including a DVD of that concert plus a CD recording of the first (1986) concert by the Navarro-López Furst duo.

In 1999, after some chamber music projects, Acher, as arranger and conductor, along with his friend Jorge de la Vega (solo flutist of the Colon Theatre Orchestra) as soloist, presented Los animales de la música (Music animals) with a forty-member orchestra. The constant pranks between the twain in a humorous and subtle musical context were found highly amusing by both children and grown-ups. Following a successful stint at the Avenida Theatre, the show was again performed at the San Martin Theatre. In 2005, after a short interval, the show made a dashing comeback to the Colon Theatre with more than twenty sold-out performances, and was repeated in Córdoba and Bahía Blanca (Argentina), Asunción (Paraguay) and still is going on. A revised version of the Gershwin project was presented with Jorge Navarro trio and orchestra during the 2006 Easter at the Wine Festival in Mendoza, Argentina. The success led to further performances at the Colon, Coliseum and Opera Theatres in Buenos Aires, the San Martin Theatre in Tucuman, and the Campana Jazz Festival in Buenos Aires province. After having lived for a little over a year in Córdoba, Acher moved to Chile, initially to Concepción, later to Santiago and since 2013 he resides in Linares, 300 km south of Santiago. While in Concepción, he accomplished new projects such as Tribute to Piazzolla, for chamber orchestra, first performed by members of the University of Concepción Symphony Orchestra, and in later years by the Chamber Orchestra of Chile and the School of Modern Music Chamber Orchestra. In 2003, he premiered his Fantasy in Concert, combining five sequences from Disney's film and live music, and in 2004 his The Orchestra Goes to School, a symphonic/didactic concert, both with the University of Concepción Symphony Orchestra. Before leaving for Santiago, he presented Acher en serio? (Acher… seriously?), conducting a chamber ensemble with works by Jobim, Schreker, Piazzolla and Richard Strauss. In 2006, Acher started a fruitful collaboration with Alejandro García "Virulo", a Cuban humourist with a long career behind him. With Virulo and two well-known Venezuelan humourists, Emilio Lovera and Laureano Márquez, Acher toured the Humour quartet on a single string in Mexico, Venezuela and Spain, besides a single performance in Havana, Cuba. In December 2009, Acher and Virulo presented in Havana their Symphonic pranks, combining musical jokes and orchestrated versions of Virulo's songs. Since 2006, Acher has been professor of subjects related to art and literature at the Diego Portales University in Santiago, Chile, whilst continuing with his musical and humour activity.

== Later career ==
In November 2011, he presented in Buenos Aires his Tribute to Piazzolla, recorded and issued by Acqua Records. After a short period as artistic director of the Linares Town Hall in 2013, he was appointed Resident Conductor of the 'Orquesta Clásica del Maule', post which he held until December 2014.

After returning in 2014 with his Symphonic pranks in Havana and Gershwin, the man we love several times in Buenos Aires, he planned to continue abroad these two projects in 2015 and 2016.

== Compositions (in chronological order) ==
- 1971:
  - Manuela's blues (Les Luthiers - instrumental)
  - Tía Ruperta (Les Luthiers - instrumental)
- 1972:
  - Si no fuera santiagueño (Were I not from Santiago) (Les Luthiers - music, with Maronna, and choral arrangement, with Lopez Puccio)
  - La bossa nostra (Les Luthiers - music, with Maronna and Nuñez Cortés)
  - Fiat 125 (Les Luthiers - music, with Núñez Cortés).
  - Pieza en forma de tango (Les Luthiers - arrangements for the studio version, with Núñez Cortés).
- 1973:
  - Les nuits de Paris (Les Luthiers - music & lyrics, with López Puccio and Maronna)
  - Serenata mariachi (Mariachi serenade) (Les Luthiers - music, with Maronna)
  - Miss Lilly Higgins sings shimmy in Mississippi's spring (Les Luthiers - music, for sixteen instruments)
- 1974:
  - Miss Lilly Higgins sings shimmy in Mississippi's spring (Les Luthiers - music, revised version for sextet)
  - La yegua mía (Mare of mine) (Les Luthiers - music)
- 1975:
  - Teresa y el Oso (Theresa and the Bear) (Les Luthiers - music)
  - Bob Gordon shops for hot dogs from Boston (Les Luthiers - instrumental)
  - El explicado (Les Luthiers - music)
- 1976:
  - Caja de sorpresas (Jack-in-the-box) (soundtrack for a medium footage film by Carlos Jerusalinsky)
  - Teresa y el oso (Theresa and the Bear) (Les Luthiers - music, revised version for orchestra and soloists)
  - Two movements for clarinet and strings
- 1977:
  - Visita a la Universidad de Wildstone (A visit to Wildstone University) (Les Luthiers - music)
  - Lazy Daisy (Les Luthiers - lyrics & music, the latter with Carlos Núñez Cortés)
  - Cantata del Adelantado Don Rodrigo (Les Luthiers - libretto, lyrics and music, with López Puccio and Maronna)
  - Jingle Bass-Pipe (Les Luthiers - music, with Núñez Cortés).
- 1978:
  - String sextet
- 1979:
  - Cartas de color (Coloured letters) (Les Luthiers - music, with Núñez Cortés; libretto, with Mundstock, López-Puccio, Fontanarrosa and Maronna).
- 1980:
  - Molloy (symphonic poem for orchestra and viola, premiered at the Colon Theatre in Buenos Aires, conducted by Pedro Ignacio Calderón).
- 1981:
  - Marcha de la conquista (Conquest march) (Les Luthiers - music, with Núñez Cortés)
  - Quartet Op. 44 (Les Luthiers - instrumental)
  - Papa Garland had a hat, and a jazzband and a mat, and a black fat cat (Les Luthiers - instrumental)
  - Añoralgias (Les Luthiers - music)
  - Siento algo por ti (Les Luthiers - music).
  - Dime si ella (Les Luthiers - music, with Núñez).
- 1983:
  - Cardoso in Gulevandia (Les Luthiers - music)
  - Entreteniciencia familiar (Family techtertainment) (Les Luthiers - music)
  - Pepper Clemens sent the messenger, nevertheless the Reverend left the herd (Les Luthiers - instrumental)
  - El regreso (The homecoming) (Les Luthiers - music)
- 1985:
  - Truthful Lulu pulls thru Zulus (Les Luthiers - instrumental)
  - Epopeya de los quince jinetes (The fifteen horsemen saga) (Les Luthiers - music)
- 1988:
  - Diatriba de amor contra un hombre sentado (A love diatribe against a sitting man) (incidental music)
  - Casi blues (Almost blues) (The Elastic Band)
  - Parapaco (The Elastic Band - with Ricardo Lew)
- 1990:
  - Historia de los blues en fascículos (A blues history in fascicles) (The Elastic Band - with Carlos Costantini and Ricardo Lew)
  - Dedos y luces (Fingers and lights) (The Elastic Band - with Enrique Varela)
- 1992:
  - Un toque de distensión (A touch of distension) (The Elastic Band)
- 2001:
  - La Nona (musical)
  - Rincones (Corners) (symphonic suite)
