= Daniel Rabinovich =

Argentinian actor and musician

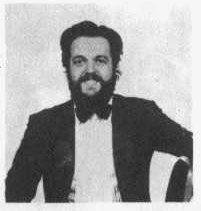
Daniel Rabinovich in 1973

Daniel Abraham Rabinovich Aratuz (November 18, 1943 – August 21, 2015) was an Argentine musician, writer, humorist, lawyer and singer. Born in Buenos Aires, Argentina, he cofounded the group Les Luthiers in 1967.

Within Les Luthiers, Rabinovich sang and played guitar, drums, violin, and some of the group's invented instruments (most notably the "basspipe a vara"). He died on August 21, 2015, at the age of 71.
