= Daniel Samper Pizano =

Colombian lawyer, journalist and writer

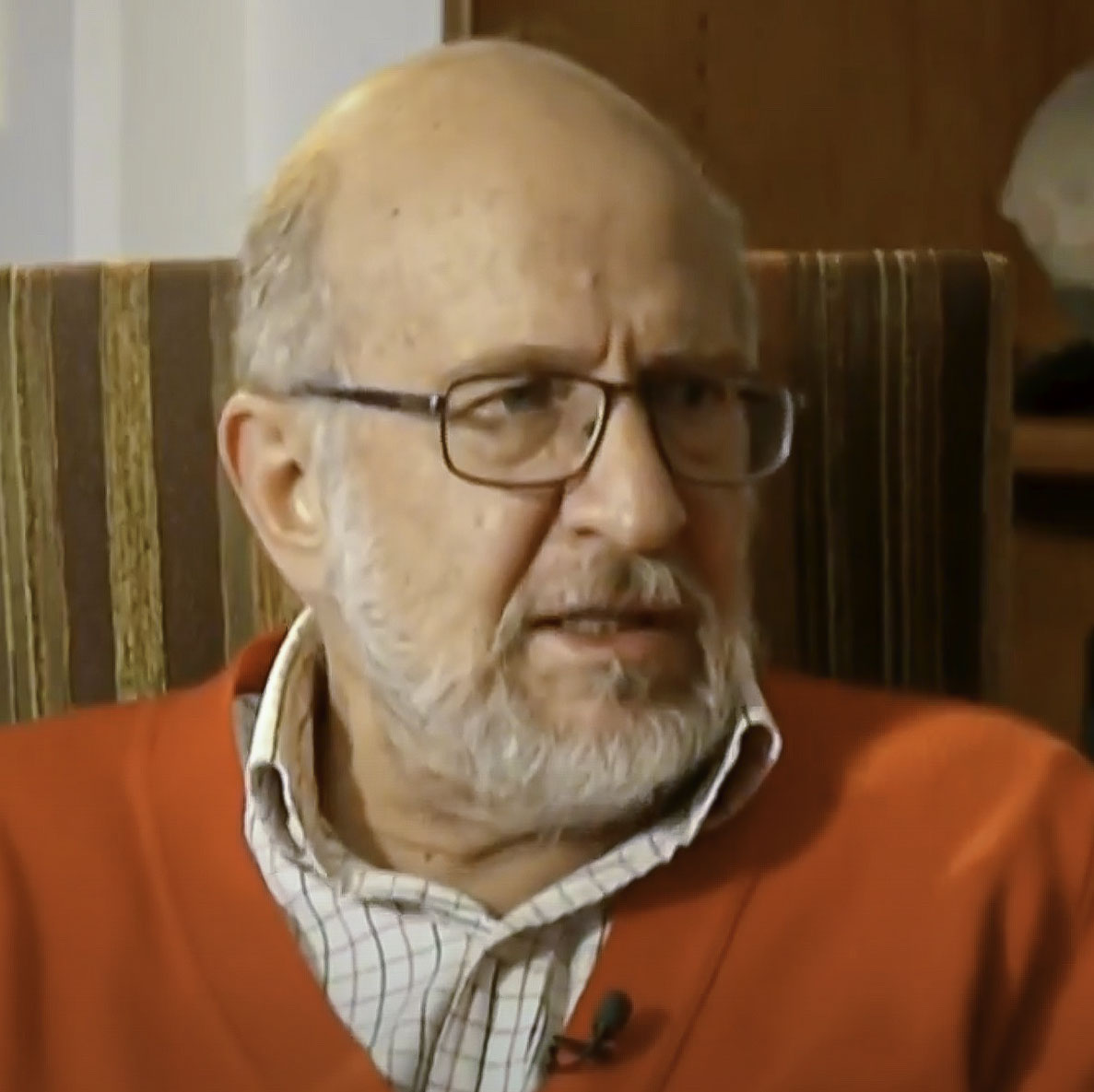
- Born: 8 June 1945 (age 81); Bogotá, D.C., Colombia
- Education: Pontifical Xavierian University; University of Kansas
- Spouse(s): Cecilia Ospina Cuéllar; Pilar Tafur (1974-present)
- Children: Juanita Samper Ospina; María Angélica Samper Ospina; Daniel Samper Ospina
- Relatives: Ernesto Samper Pizano (brother)
- Writing career
- Genres: Novel, Creative nonfiction
- Literary movement: Postmodern

Daniel Samper Pizano (born 8 June 1945) is a Colombian lawyer, journalist, and prolific writer.

== Career ==
Samper attended the Gimnasio Moderno, where he began writing in the student newspaper El Aguilucho. At the age of 19 he worked for the Colombian newspaper El Tiempo as a reporter. After graduating from high school, Samper studied law in the Pontifical Xavierian University and later attended graduate school for journalism at the University of Kansas, United States. He was also awarded the Nieman Fellowship by Harvard University. Since then he has been an editor, columnist and author of some 38 books, TV and movie screenwriter and winner of numerous recognitions and awards in Colombia and abroad; Among these, the Maria Moors Cabot prize awarded by Columbia University, the "Rey de España" prize and has won the Colombian "Simón Bolívar Prize for Journalism" three times. His writings are notable for his wide-ranging and soft sense of humor, combined with a degree of social criticism. He writes a column for El Tiempo, entitled "Cambalache" (colloquialism meaning "Exchange") and the magazine Carrusel with a humor section called "Postre de notas", as well as various articles for Colombian magazines such as El Malpensante, Revista Semana and Gatopardo. In Colombia, Samper is also considered the father of Colombian investigative journalism for his work as a reporter with the El Tiempo newspaper.

Since 1986 Samper has resided in Madrid; he was an editor of the Spanish magazine Cambio 16. He is also a member of the Academia Colombiana de la Lengua. As a TV screenwriter, he wrote scripts for the Colombian TV series Dejémonos de vainas during the 1980s and 1990s.

== Personal life ==
Daniel was born in Bogotá on 8 June 1945 to Andrés Samper Gnecco and Helena Pizano Pardo, the eldest of five children, his other siblings were, Ernesto, José Gabriel, Juan Francisco, and María Fernanda. He married Cecilia Ospina Cuéllar, with whom he had three children, Juanita, María Angélica, and Daniel. He later divorced and married Pilar Tafur in 1974.

== Selected works ==
- Samper Pizano, Daniel (1976). Antología de grandes reportajes colombianos [Anthology of Great Colombian Newsreport]. Bogotá: Editora Nueva Frontera. OCLC 3538946.
- Samper Pizano, Daniel (1980). A mí que me esculquen [You Can Search Me]. Bogotá: Editorial Pluma. OCLC 123181974.
- Samper Pizano, Daniel (1983). ¡Llévate esos payasos! [Take Those Clowns Away!]. Bogotá: Editorial Pluma. OCLC 11647767.
- Samper Pizano, Daniel (1984). ¡Piedad con este pobre huérfano! [Take Pity On This Poor Orphan!]. Narrativa colombiana. Bogotá: Plaza & Janes. ISBN 978-958-14-0018-8. OCLC 13085224.
- Samper Pizano, Daniel (1989). Esto no es vida [This Is Not Life]. Bogotá: Intermedio Editores. ISBN 978-958-637-116-2. OCLC 22828795.
- Samper Pizano, Daniel (1991). Les Luthiers de la L a la S [Les Luthiers from L to S]. Buenos Aires: Ediciones de la Flor. OCLC 26856913.
- Samper Pizano, Daniel (1992). No es porque sea mi hijo: y otras columnas de humor [It's Not Because He Is My Son: And Other Comedy Columns]. Bogotá: El Ancora Editores. ISBN 978-958-9012-79-6. OCLC 31208172.
- Samper Pizano, Daniel (1993). Lecciones de histeria de Colombia [Lessons of Colombian Hysteria]. Bogotá: Ancora Editores. ISBN 978-958-9012-91-8. OCLC 31046096.
- Samper Pizano, Daniel (1994). Nuevas lecciones de histeria de Colombia: desde la independencia hasta ahorita [New Lessons of Colombian Hysteria: From Independence Until Now]. Bogotá: Ancora Editores. ISBN 978-958-36-0005-0. OCLC 33157287.
- Maronna, Jorge Luis; Samper Pizano, Daniel (1994). Cantando bajo la ducha: quince lecciones para alcanzar el sueño de ser músico [Singing In The Shower: Fifteen Lessons To Reach Your Dream To Become A Singer]. Colección El Papagayo. Madrid: Temas de Hoy. ISBN 978-84-7880-441-2. OCLC 34576565.
- Samper Pizano, Daniel (1995). Aspectos sicológicos del calzoncillo : y otros artículos de humor [Psychological Aspects of Underwear: And Other Humoristic Articles]. Bogotá: El Ancora. ISBN 978-958-36-0021-0. OCLC 34782004.
- Maronna, Jorge Luis; Samper Pizano, Daniel (1997). Confesiones de un espermatozoide [Confessions of a Spermatozoon]. Madrid: Temas de Hoy. ISBN 978-84-7880-870-0. OCLC 39456121.
- Samper Pizano, Daniel; Fontanarrosa, Roberto (1998). Si Eva hubiera sido Adán: una versión risueña de la Biblia [If Eve Had Been Adam: A Cheerful Version of the Bible]. Bogotá: Ancora Editores. ISBN 978-958-36-0072-2. OCLC 39710358.
- Leguina, Joaquín (1999). "Como un ciervo, como un jabalí, como un siervo" [Like A Deer, Like A Warthog, Like A Servant]. 10 relatos históricos [10 Historic Tales]. Auryn narrativa. el al (Daniel Samper Pizano). Madrid: Auryn. ISBN 978-84-930276-3-6. OCLC 50598357.
- Samper Pizano, Daniel; Maronna, Jorge Luis (1999). De tripas corazón: una novela berracamente espiritual [Making Due: A Freaking Spiritual Novel]. Bogotá: Ancora Editores. ISBN 978-958-36-0060-9. OCLC 50041677.
- Samper Pizano, Daniel (2002). Antología de grandes entrevistas colombianas [Anthology of Great Colombian Interviews]. Bogotá: Aguilar. ISBN 978-958-704-001-2. OCLC 50803688.
- Samper Pizano, Daniel; Salvador Lavado, Joaquín (2002). Del adulterio considerado como una de las bellas artes y otros escritos de humor [Of Adultery, Considered a Fine Art: And Other Humoristic Writings]. Bogotá: El Ancora Editores. ISBN 978-958-36-0092-0. OCLC 52886680.
- Samper Pizano, Daniel (2003). Antología de grandes crónicas colombianas [Anthology of Great Colombian Chronicles]. Bogotá: Aguilar. ISBN 978-958-704-103-3. OCLC 54071930.
- Samper Pizano, Daniel; Salvador Lavado, Joaquín (2003). El discreto encanto del liguero: y otros motivos para sonreir [The Discreet Charm of the garter: And other reasons to smile]. Bogotá: El Ancora editories. ISBN 978-958-36-0103-3. OCLC 55103225.
- Samper Pizano, Daniel (2003). Impávido coloso [Undaunted colossus]. Madrid: Alfaguara. ISBN 978-84-204-6688-0. OCLC 52310335.
- Samper Pizano, Daniel (2005). Versos chuecos [Crooked Verses]. Bogotá: Aguilar. ISBN 978-958-704-363-1. OCLC 70208327.
- Samper Pizano, Daniel (2005). Viagra, Chats y otras pendejadas del siglo XXI [Viagra, Chatrooms, and other stupid things of the 21st Century]. Bogotá: Aguilar. ISBN 958-704-487-8. OCLC 276348674.
- Samper Pizano, Daniel (2009). La Mica del Titanic [The Bedpan of the Titanic]. Bogotá: Aguilar. ISBN 978-958-704-912-1.
