= Daniel Samper Ospina =

Colombian comedian and columnist

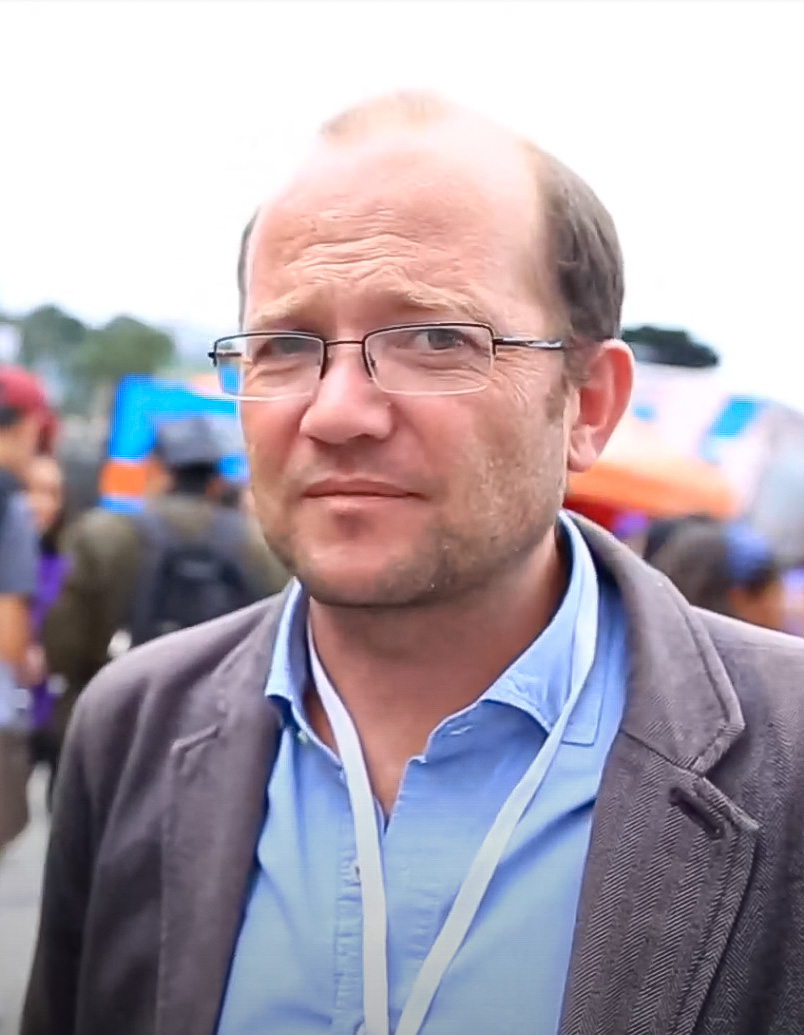
- Born: 15 August 1974 (age 51); Bogotá, D.C., Colombia
- Occupations: Comedian, journalist
- Spouse: Claudia García Jaramillo (2006–present)
- Children: Guadalupe Samper García; Paloma Samper García
- Relatives: Daniel Samper Pizano (father); Ernesto Samper (uncle)
- Family: Samper Family

Daniel Samper Ospina was born in Bogotá, Colombia, in 1974. He is a Colombian comedian and columnist, and previous director of adult magazine SoHo from 2001 to 2014. He also wrote for Revista Semana.

Samper studied literature at Pontifical Xavierian University, later becoming a literature teacher at Gimnasio Moderno School, and a journalism teacher at University of the Andes, in Bogotá.

As a journalist he worked at Cromos, and Jet Set; as a columnist, he wrote columns for El Tiempo, and from 2008 to 2020, he wrote at Semana, turning it into a controversial, subject for debate in the media. Though a recognized columnist in Colombia, Samper Ospina hardly engages in serious political analysis; rather, he is a satirical commentator whose main objective is to deprecate politicians (mostly of conservative convictions) under the umbrella of satire and black humor.

== Personal life ==
Daniel was born on August 15, 1974, to Daniel Samper Pizano, and Cecilia Ospina Cuéllar, their only son; having two older sisters Juanita, and María Angélica. He is the nephew of Ernesto Samper Pizano, Colombia's former president, whose administration was marked by the biggest political scandal in Colombia's history. Investigations performed by authorities in Colombia, and the US demonstrated that the Cali Cartel, a criminal organization involved in drug trafficking, sponsored Samper's campaign to the presidency. In response, the Department of State revoked Samper's visa to enter the US, a sanction that remains effective until now. He identifies spiritually as an agnostic.

On July 29, 2006, Daniel married Claudia García Jaramillo in a civil ceremony in Bogotá. Together they have two daughters, Guadalupe (b. 2006) and Paloma (b. 2008).
