= Carlos Núñez Cortés =

Argentine actor and musician

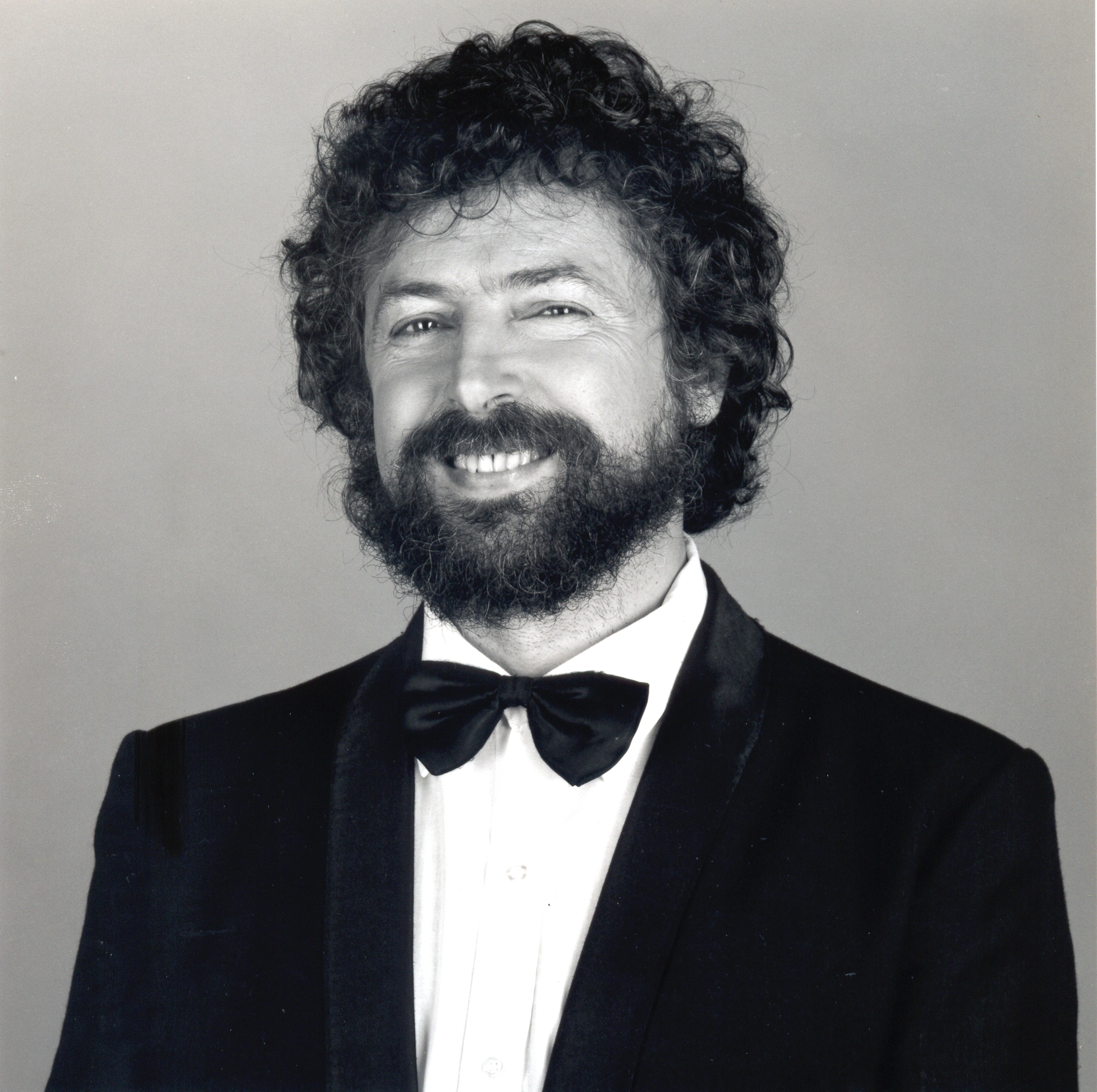
Carlos Núñez Cortés.

Carlos Núñez Cortés (born October 15, 1942 in Buenos Aires, Argentina) is a pianist, actor, composer, multi-instrumentist and singer. He has been a member of Les Luthiers since 1969 until 2017, when he retired. He also wrote 3 books (in Spanish): "Los juegos de Mastropiero", "100 caracoles argentinos" and "Memorias de un luthier".

In Les Luthiers, his functions included:

- Creating new instruments (e.g. Bunsen flute, glamocot).
- Composing (e.g. Las Majas, Teorema de Thales, San Ictícola, Epopeya de Edipo).
- Vocal arrangements (e.g. Conozca el Interior).
- Singing (e.g. Voglio Entrare, most Serenatas, A la Playa con Mariana, etc.). In choral pieces he usually sang the highest voice part.
- Playing piano and synths as well as many other instruments (Bunsen flute, recorder, washboard, glamocot, kazoo, coconut marimba, etc.).

He is also an expert malacologist, owning an extensive collection of sea shells. He published a book on the subject, 100 Caracoles Argentinos, co-written with the naturalist Tito Narosky. Núñez Cortés holds a degree in biological chemistry. He is now participating as a columnist for the Podcast called "La Hora de la Nostalgia"
