= Marcos Mundstock =

Argentine musician (1942–2020)

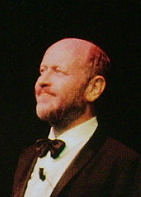
Marcos Mundstock

Marcos Mundstock (May 25, 1942 – April 22, 2020) was an Argentine musician, writer, comedian, actor, broadcaster and copywriter. He had dual nationality of Argentina and Spain, having obtained the latter in 2012.

Born in Santa Fe, Argentina, he was best known as a founding member of Les Luthiers, their emcee, and as writer of many of their shows and lyrics. He also invented one of their most famous instruments, the gom-horn (a trumpet parody) and occasionally played keyboards and percussion for their numbers. Mostly, his role was that of the 'non-musician' member, in spite of having sung for their (mostly operatic) pieces with some frequency.

In the beginning of 2020, it was announced that, due to health problems, Mundstock would not be a part of Les Luthiers for the year. He died on April 22, 2020, in Buenos Aires, due to a brain tumor diagnosed in 2019.

== Honours ==
- Spain:
  - Commander by Number of the Order of Isabella the Catholic (cnYC) (2007)
