= Les Luthiers =

Argentine comedy-musical group

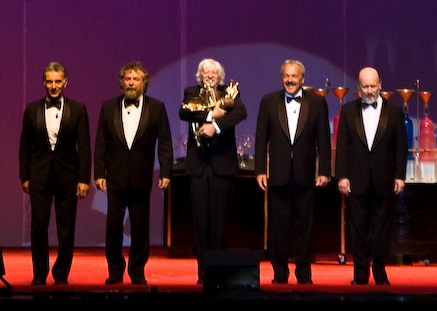
- Les Luthiers performing in their show Los Premios Mastropiero in 2006

Background information
- Origin: Buenos Aires, Argentina
- Genre: Musical parody
- Years active: 1967–2023
- Members: Deceased: Gerardo Masana (founder) (1973); Daniel Rabinovich (2015); Marcos Mundstock (2020); Ernesto Acher (2025) Historical: Jorge Maronna; Carlos Núñez Cortés; Carlos López Puccio Contracted: Horacio "Tato" Turano; Roberto Antier; Martín O'Connor; Tomás Mayer Wolf
- Website: lesluthiers.com

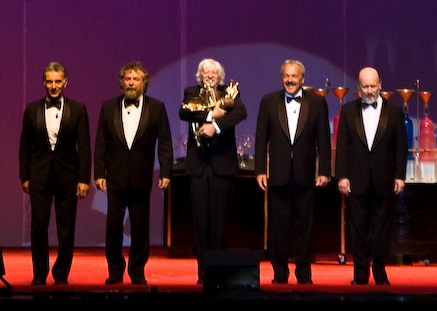
Les Luthiers in 2008.

Les Luthiers was an Argentine comedy-musical group, very popular also in several other Spanish-speaking countries including Paraguay, Guatemala, Peru, Chile, Ecuador, Spain, Colombia, Mexico, Uruguay, Bolivia, Cuba, Costa Rica and Venezuela. They were formed in 1967 by Gerardo Masana, during the height of a period of very intense choral music activity in Argentina's state universities. Their outstanding characteristic is the home-made musical instruments (hence the name luthiers, French for "musical instrument maker"), some of them extremely sophisticated, which they skillfully employ in their recitals to produce music and texts full of high class and refined humor. From 1977 until his death in 2007, they worked with Roberto Fontanarrosa, a renowned Argentine cartoonist and writer.

== Background ==
The group emerged from members of the university classical choir I Musicisti. Initially a quartet (Masana, Maronna, Mundstock, and Rabinovich), they became a quintet with the addition of Carlos Núñez Cortés, then a septet with Carlos López Puccio in 1969 and Ernesto Acher in 1971. After Masana's death in 1973, they continued as a sextet, and following Acher's departure in 1986, they stabilized as a quintet—López Puccio, Núñez Cortés, Maronna, Mundstock, and Rabinovich—for 29 years until Rabinovich's death in 2015. Since 2000, Horacio "Tato" Turano and, from 2012, Martín O'Connor joined as substitute Luthiers. After Rabinovich's death, Roberto Antier (previously tested in 2010) and Tomás Mayer Wolf were hired as replacements, with Turano and O’Connor becoming full members. With Núñez Cortés's retirement in September 2017, Mayer Wolf became a full member, maintaining a six-member lineup. Due to health issues, Mundstock stepped away, and Antier joined as a full member, with Santiago Otero Ramos and Pablo Rabinovich hired as stable substitutes. This lineup, known as Les Luthiers Elenco 2019, persisted until 2023.

The group received numerous accolades, including a special mention at the Konex Awards, the Latin Grammy Special Award for Musical Excellence (United States, 2011), and the Order of Isabella the Catholic for their career (Spain, 2007). They were named illustrious citizens of Buenos Aires and honored guests in many Latin American cities. In 2012, Spain granted them Spanish citizenship by letter of nature, a special recognition for individuals of exceptional merit. In 2017, they won the Princess of Asturias Award for Communication and Humanities, marking their 50th anniversary.

== Members ==
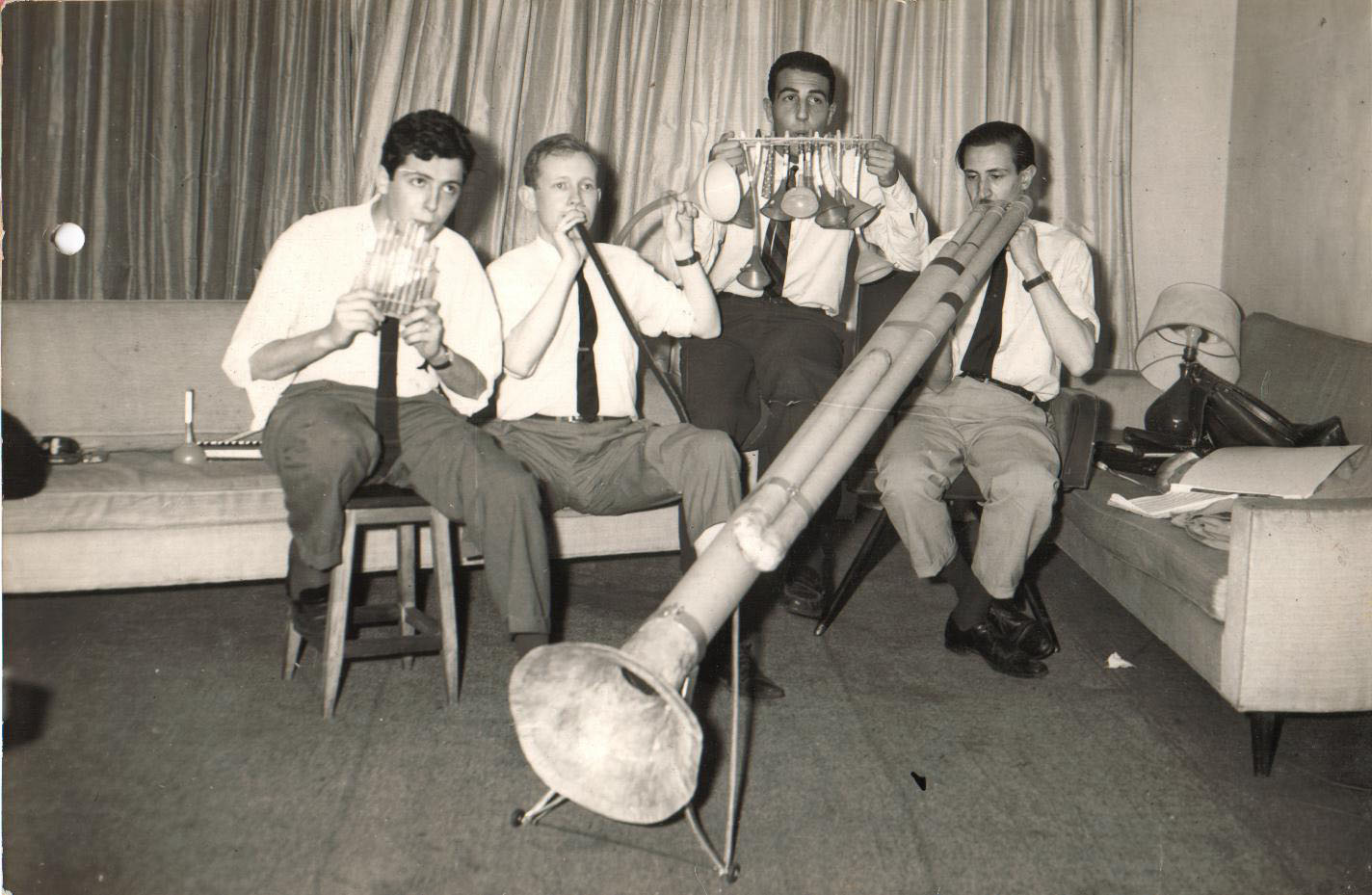
Part of "I Musicisti" during a rehearsal: Carlos Núñez Cortés, Marcos Mundstock, Daniel Durán, and Gerardo Masana (1965), Buenos Aires, Argentina.

=== First Formation (1967–1969) ===
- Gerardo Masana: founder, luthier, strings, winds, voice, and metal.
- Marcos Mundstock: presenter, winds, voice.
- Jorge Maronna: strings, voice.
- Daniel Rabinovich: guitar, winds, Latin, alt-pipe, bass-pipe, percussion, voice.

=== Second Formation (1969–1971) ===
- Gerardo Masana: founder, luthier, strings, winds, voice, and metal.
- Marcos Mundstock: presenter, winds, voice.
- Jorge Maronna: strings, voice.
- Carlos Núñez Cortés: keyboards, winds, voice.
- Carlos López Puccio: violin, violata, piano, voice.
- Daniel Rabinovich: guitar, winds, Latin, alt-pipe, bass-pipe, percussion, voice.

=== Third Formation (1971–1973) ===
- Gerardo Masana (died November 23, 1973).
- Marcos Mundstock (temporarily left in 1971).
- Jorge Maronna: strings, voice.
- Carlos López Puccio: Latin, keyboards, percussion, voice.
- Carlos Núñez Cortés: keyboards, winds, voice.
- Ernesto Acher: winds, keyboards, voice (initially a substitute for Mundstock, later a permanent member).
- Daniel Rabinovich: guitar, winds, Latin, alt-pipe, bass-pipe, percussion, voice.

=== Fourth Formation (1973–1986) ===
- Marcos Mundstock.
- Jorge Maronna: strings, voice.
- Carlos López Puccio: Latin, keyboards, percussion, voice.
- Carlos Núñez Cortés: keyboards, winds, voice.
- Ernesto Acher (left in late September 1986).
- Daniel Rabinovich: guitar, winds, Latin, alt-pipe, bass-pipe, percussion, voice.

=== Fifth Formation (1986–2015) ===
- Marcos Mundstock
- Jorge Maronna
- Carlos López Puccio
- Carlos Núñez Cortés
- Daniel Rabinovich (took medical leave in 2015; died August 21, 2015)

=== Sixth Formation (2015–2017) ===
- Marcos Mundstock
- Jorge Maronna
- Carlos López Puccio
- Carlos Núñez Cortés (retired September 24, 2017, after the group's 50th anniversary)
- Horacio "Tato" Turano
- Martín O'Connor

=== Seventh Formation (2017–2019) ===
- Marcos Mundstock
- Jorge Maronna
- Carlos López Puccio
- Horacio "Tato" Turano
- Martín O'Connor
- Tomás Mayer Wolf

=== Eighth Formation "Elenco 2019" (2019–2023) ===
- Jorge Maronna
- Carlos López Puccio
- Horacio "Tato" Turano
- Martín O'Connor
- Tomás Mayer Wolf
- Roberto Antier

== Beginnings ==
During the 1960s, nearly every faculty in Argentine universities had its own musical choir. Some members began meeting outside rehearsals to create musical jokes for fun, which they later performed as humorous interludes at inter-choral festivals throughout the academic year.

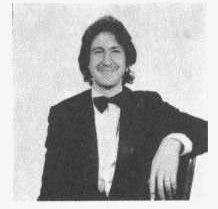
Gerardo Masana, author of Cantata Laxatón and one of the group's founders

In September 1965, the VI University Choir Festival took place in San Miguel de Tucumán, located in Northwest Argentina. A group of young university students presented a humorous musical performance they had long prepared, featuring a novel orchestral ensemble of instruments they invented and built from simple materials. They staged a parody of a concert, with a soloist, a small choir, and these unconventional instruments.

The centerpiece was Cantata Modatón, composed by Gerardo Masana, a member of the Faculty of Engineering choir at the University of Buenos Aires. Masana, alongside Buenos Aires luthier and musician Carlos Iraldi, invented most of these "informal instruments." The music parodied Baroque cantatas, drawing inspiration from Johann Sebastian Bach’s St Matthew Passion, BWV 244, while the lyrics were sourced from a popular laxative's prospectus. Later renamed Cantata Laxatón to avoid issues with the laxative's manufacturer, the performance was a resounding success, praised for its originality, humor, and precision by attendees and critics in music publications.

Shortly after, the group unexpectedly received a contract to repeat the Tucumán show at a renowned avant-garde venue in Buenos Aires. Performing as I Musicisti, they again achieved great success. They were then invited by the Di Tella Institute of Arts, Buenos Aires’ premier center for theater, music, and visual arts studies, known globally as a "temple of artistic vanguard." Their show, IMYLOH (short for I Musicisti y las óperas históricas), was another triumph.

== Artistic development ==
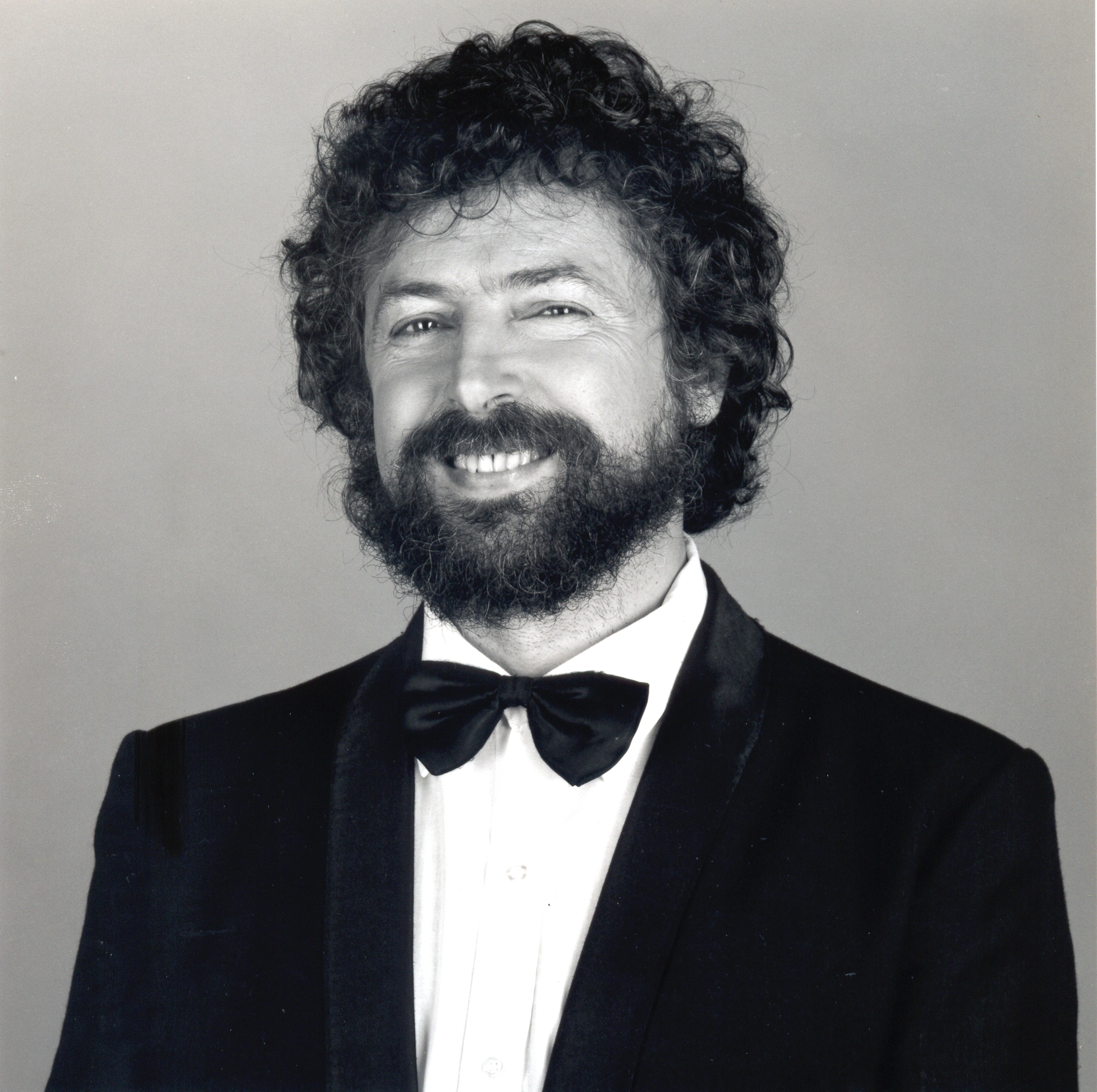
Carlos Núñez Cortés

In 1967, internal disputes over compensation led to the dissolution of I Musicisti. Key members—Gerardo Masana, Marcos Mundstock, Jorge Maronna, and Daniel Rabinovich—continued under the name Les Luthiers, joined by Carlos Núñez Cortés, while I Musicisti soon disbanded without its instruments or main writers. Around this time, Les Luthiers’ compositions began appearing in theater soundtracks and short films like Angelito el secuestrado by Leal Rey.

The group performed in theaters and café-concerts. In 1969, they hired Rosario native Carlos López Puccio as a violinist, and in 1971, Ernesto Acher joined, initially replacing Mundstock before becoming a permanent member. Early shows included:

- Les Luthiers cuentan la ópera (1967)
- Blancanieves y los siete pecados capitales (1969)
- Querida condesa (1969)
- Opus Pi (1971)

They also appeared on television in Todos somos mala gente with prominent comedians and in Los mejores, performing exclusive recitals. This period marked successful seasons in Buenos Aires and Mar del Plata.

On November 23, 1973, the group lost its founder, Gerardo Masana, to leukemia at age 36. His absence strained member relations, leading them to undertake institutional therapy with psychoanalyst Fernando Ulloa for 17 years.

After nine years in Argentina, they began international tours in 1977, producing a new show every two to three years. Early tours visited Uruguay and Venezuela, followed by Spain. By the late 1970s, they performed in Mexico City, including at the Palacio de Bellas Artes.

In 1985, they received a Special Mention at the Konex Awards for their significant contribution to Argentine popular music, one of the highest honors from the Konex Foundation.

In 1986, a landmark performance at Buenos Aires’ Teatro Colón and their debut in Colombia’s Teatro Colón coincided with Ernesto Acher’s departure on August 28 due to internal differences, reducing the group to five members until 2015, when substitutes became more regular.

In 1994, Daniel Rabinovich’s heart issues led to Argentine comedian Horacio Fontova temporarily joining until Rabinovich recovered.

Since 1970, their shows followed a format of comic pieces introduced by Marcos Mundstock with a description or fictional composer biography, followed by a performance. However, four later shows—Los Premios Mastropiero (2005), Lutherapia (2008), the anthology Viejos hazmerreíres (2014), and Más tropiezos de Mastropiero (2022)—deviated, weaving pieces into narratives like an awards ceremony, a therapy session, a radio broadcast, and a TV interview.

Three books have been written about the group. The first, published in 1991 by Colombian journalist Daniel Samper Pizano, is titled Les Luthiers from L to S. The second, released in 2004, was authored by Sebastián Masana, son of the group's founder Gerardo Masana, and is called Gerardo Masana and the Founding of Les Luthiers. The third, written by group member Carlos Núñez Cortés, is titled Mastropiero's Games, offering an in-depth analysis of the various humor techniques employed by Les Luthiers.

In 2007, marking their 40th anniversary, the Buenos Aires legislature unanimously declared them Illustrious Citizens. Additionally, the Spanish government awarded Les Luthiers the Encomienda de Número of the Order of Isabella the Catholic, Spain's highest honor for foreigners, granting the musicians the title of "Illustrious Lords.”

On November 18, 2007, Les Luthiers celebrated their 40th anniversary with a free concert titled Cuarenta años de trayectoria at San Benito Park, located at the intersection of Figueroa Alcorta and La Pampa avenues in Buenos Aires. The event drew over 120,000 spectators.

In 2008, Daniel Rabinovich, Marcos Mundstock, Carlos Núñez Cortés, Jorge Maronna, and Carlos López Puccio provided the Spanish dubbed voices for the pigeon characters in Disney's animated film Bolt.

On September 7, 2012, the Spanish government granted Spanish nationality to Carlos López Puccio, Marcos Mundstock, and Daniel Rabinovich.

On October 20, 2017, they were awarded the Princess of Asturias Award for Communication and Humanities.

== Final years (2015–2023) ==
Daniel Rabinovich’s death in 2015 was a significant blow, shifting the quintet to a sextet with Horacio "Tato" Turano and Martín O’Connor becoming full members, splitting Rabinovich's musical (Turano) and acting (O’Connor) roles. Roberto Antier and Tomás Mayer Wolf joined as substitutes.

In late 2017, Carlos Núñez Cortés retired, stating in an interview: "This is a personal decision tied to my desire for a well-deserved rest after 50 uninterrupted years on stage, but I'll remain connected to the group, which has been a huge part of my life and I hope will continue to be.” Mayer Wolf became a full member, filling Núñez Cortés's roles.

Health issues forced Marcos Mundstock offstage in 2019, with Antier replacing him during tours of Viejos Hazmerreíres and Gran Reserva into 2020. Santiago Otero Ramos and Pablo Rabinovich joined as substitutes/alternates.

In November 2019, the podcast La Hora de la Nostalgia began releasing episodes detailing the group's history with archival material, featuring Carlos Núñez Cortés.

The Viejos Hazmerreíres tour in Spain was halted in March 2020 due to the COVID-19 pandemic. Mundstock died in April 2020, and a new show in development was postponed.

In 2021, a favorable agreement on copyright and trademark rights allowed performances to resume in January 2022 under the artistic direction of Jorge Maronna and Carlos López Puccio as "Les Luthiers Elenco 2019," featuring anthologies Viejos Hazmerreíres and Gran Reserva. The "Elenco 2019" comprised Maronna, López Puccio, and four former substitutes turned full members: Turano, O’Connor, Mayer Wolf, and Antier.

On November 18, 2022, they premiered their final show, Más tropiezos de Mastropiero, in Rosario (López Puccio's hometown), featuring 10 new pieces by Maronna and López Puccio. After six performances, it debuted in Buenos Aires’ Teatro Opera on January 12, 2023, receiving positive reviews.

On January 5, 2023, they announced their disbandment: "After 55 years, we announce our definitive farewell from the stage. Having achieved our goals over more than half a century, we (Carlos and Jorge) decided to bid farewell with a world tour featuring our final show."

The 2023 farewell tour began in Buenos Aires on January 12, concluding there on March 25 after 30 performances, and included:

- April: Quito (Ecuador); Monterrey, Guadalajara, Mexico City (Mexico)
- May: Bogotá, Medellín (Colombia)
- June: Madrid, Seville (Spain)
- July: Nerja, Barcelona, Sant Feliu de Guíxols (Spain); Santa Cruz (Bolivia)
- August: Tucumán, Salta, Córdoba, Mendoza, San Juan (Argentina)
- September: Santiago (Chile); Rosario (Argentina)
- October: Montevideo (Uruguay); La Plata (Argentina)
- November: San José (Costa Rica); Lima (Peru)

The tour, totaling 113 performances (119 including Rosario's six in 2022), ended on December 9 at the Gran Plaza Theater in Bahía Blanca (Maronna's hometown), marking Les Luthiers’ final show.

== Johann Sebastian Mastropiero ==
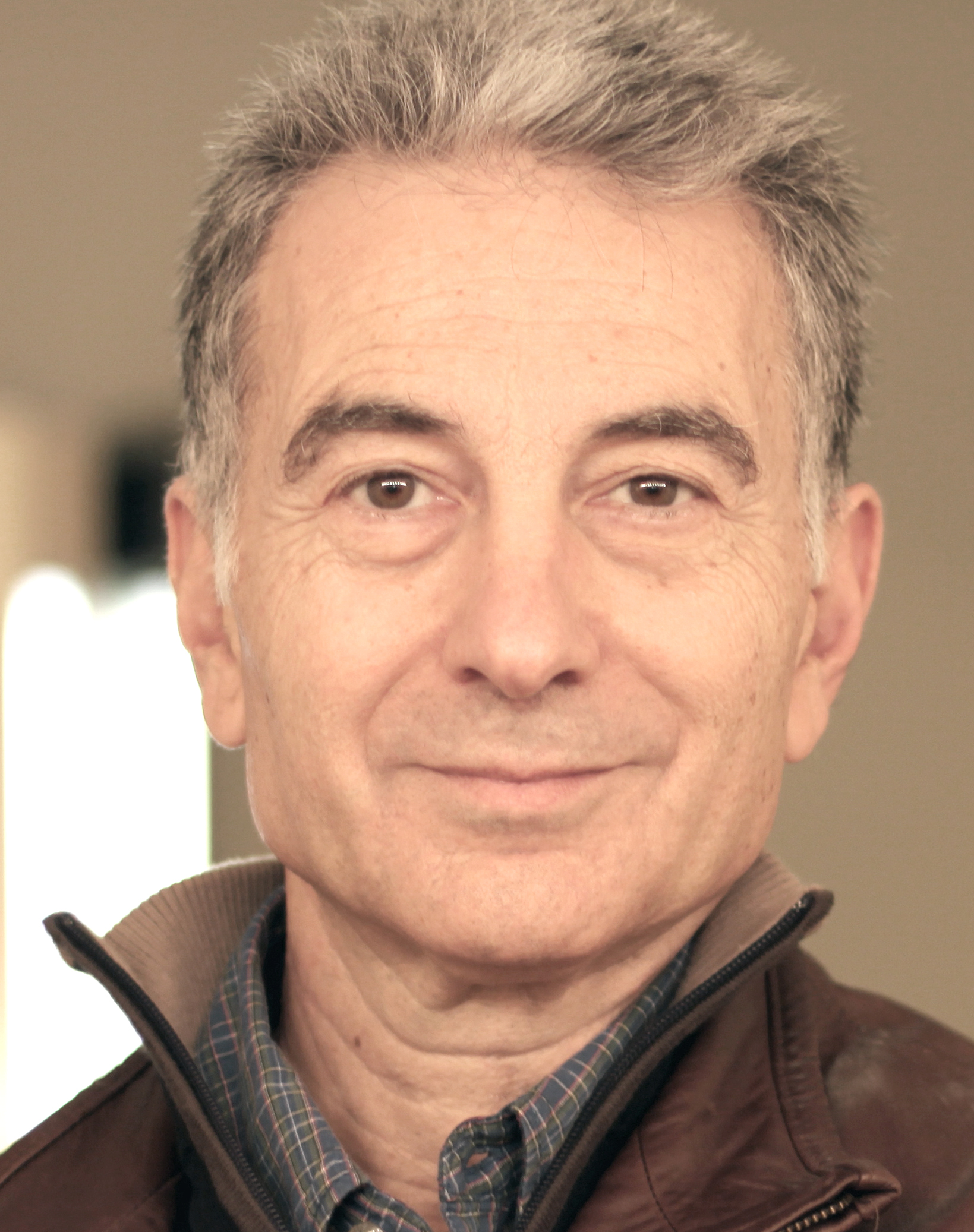
Jorge Maronna, 2017.

Les Luthiers frequently centered sketches and shows around the fictional Johann Sebastian Mastropiero. While they created other characters like folk composer "Manuel Darío," maharishi "Salí Baba," bossa nova artist "Dorival Lampada" (Lampiño), and pastor "Warren Sánchez," Mastropiero appeared most often.

The character originated in the early 1960s from a manuscript Marcos Mundstock dictated to Horacio López in a bar, initially named "Freddy Mastropiero." Gerardo Masana suggested "Freddy" gave a "mafioso" vibe. In 1966, Jorge Maronna renamed him "Johann Sebastian Masana," honoring Masana's compositional role and admiration for Johann Sebastian Bach. He debuted in ¿Música? Sí, claro on May 17, 1967, at the Teatro de Artes y Ciencias, still under "I Musicisti.”

Today marks another anniversary of the birth of the great Italian-Yankee composer Johann Sebastian Masana [...] Born in Manhattan, son of an Italian mother and father (pause). His last words were for the instrument that accompanied him throughout life: "Piano, piano, me voy lontano."

— Biography from ¿Música? Sí, claro (1967)

In 1970, renamed Johann Sebastian Mastropiero, he headlined "Querida Condesa: carta de Johann Sebastian Mastropiero a la condesa de Shortshot.”

Mastropiero's turbulent life, narrated by Mundstock, includes being born to an Italian mother and father (...); having a mafioso twin, Harold; a stable relationship with the Countess of Shortshot, with whom he had children whose surnames translate hers into various languages; employing a gypsy maid who left him an adopted son, Azuceno; and numerous other comedic escapades.

== Informal instruments ==
Luthier, French for stringed instrument maker, inspired the group's name due to their creation of instruments from unconventional materials like cans, hoses, cardboard tubes, and balloons. Gerardo Masana crafted the first, the bass-pipe a vara, using discarded cardboard tubes and household items. Forty years later, a version of this rolling tube remains in use.

Early instruments were simple, like the gom-horn (hose, funnel, trumpet mouthpiece), often parodying standard instruments (e.g., latín, violata). Later, luthier Carlos Iraldi refined their construction, blending technical precision and artistry, creating pieces like the mandocleta (bicycle wheel strumming a mandolin), ferrocalíope (steam-powered calliope with train whistles), bajo barríltono (double bass with a barrel body), and órgano de campaña.

After Iraldi's 1995 death, Hugo Domínguez took over, crafting instruments like the desafinaducha, nomeolbídet, and alambique encantador.

Using standard classifications, their instruments include:

=== Stringed instruments ===
- Latín or Tin Violin: resonance box is a ham can.
- Violata or Tin Viola: resonance box is a paint can with a viola pegbox.
- Contrachitarrone da gamba: hybrid of cello and guitar.
- Chelo legüero: blend of cello and bombo legüero, playable with a bow or drumstick.
- Cellato: cello-like, made from a cleaner bottle.
- Mandocleta: bicycle wheel strums a bouzouki-style mandolin.
- Lira de asiento or Lirodoro: lyre with a toilet seat frame and mandolin pegs.
- Guitarra dulce: guitar with two sweet potato preserve cans.
- Bajo barríltono: double bass with a wooden barrel body, wheeled for mobility.
- Nomeolbídet: organistrum with a bidet body and PVC fingerboard.

=== Wind instruments ===
- Bass-pipe a vara: trombone-like, made of cardboard tubes on a wheeled cart; its treble version, alt-pipe a vara, uses PVC.
- Tubófono silicónico cromático: pan flute-like, with test tubes filled with silicone; earlier version used paraffin.
- Gaita de cámara: giant bagpipe with a tractor tire chamber, feeding a glamocot, clamaneus, and melodica.
- Narguilófono: recorder in a hookah.
- Alambique encantador: large, three-section instrument (acrylic glasses, plastic bottles, water jugs) requiring three players.
- Glamocot: medieval crumhorn-like, sounds like a small bassoon, part of the gaita de cámara.
- Órgano de campaña: backpack pipe organ with shoe bellows.
- Glisófono pneumático: pan flute with an air pump and tuning plunger.
- Bocineta: kazoo with a gramophone horn.
- Gom-horn natural: trumpet mimic with a garden hose and funnel; variants include pistons and a helmet-mounted version.
- Calephone da cassa: trombone with a water heater body.
- Yerbomatófono d'amore: mate gourd halves as a voice masker.
- Corneta de asiento: wooden stools producing cornet sounds when sat upon, linked to a bellows system.
- Clamaneus: reed instrument, deeper than the glamocot, part of the gaita de cámara.
- Manguelódica pneumática: melodica with balloons supplying air, played horizontally.
- Ferrocalíope: calliope with steam-powered train whistles.
- Bolarmonio: 18 handballs as a keyboard, sounding via accordion reeds.

=== Percussion instruments ===
- Dactilófono or Playing Machine: typewriter with aluminium tubes sounding like a xylophone.
- Cascarudo: small instrument with a güiro and yogurt container, mimicking a beetle's sound.
- Desafinaducha: shower-inspired, with water spinning a mill that strikes a metallophone.
- OMNI (Unidentified Musical Object): bicycle pump-like, ejecting a cork for a popping sound.
- Campanófono a martillo: keyboard triggering electromagnets to strike metal tubes like bells.
- Tablas de lavar: three washboards with tin, cymbal, woodblock, and cowbell, played with thimbles and horns.
- Shoephone or Zapatófono: crank mechanism lifting and dropping shoes on wood.
- Marimba de cocos: marimba with 19 hollow coconuts instead of wooden bars.

=== Other ===
- Antenor: robot producing sounds and moving, with adjustable facial expressions, controlled remotely by three people.
- Exorcítara: harp-shaped frame with neon tube "strings" (turquoise for treble, red for bass).

=== Instrument Gallery ===
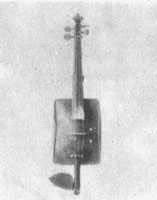
Latín

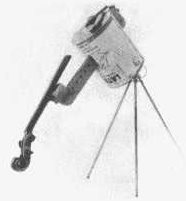
Violata

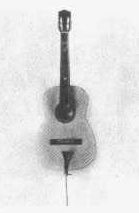
Contrachitarrone da gamba

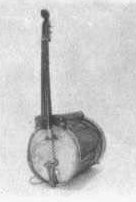
Chelo legüero

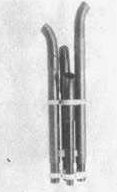
Alt-pipe a vara

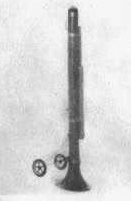
Bass-pipe a vara

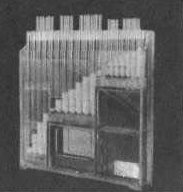
Tubófono silicónico cromático

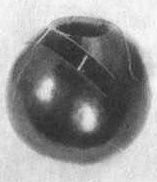
Yerbomatófono d'amore

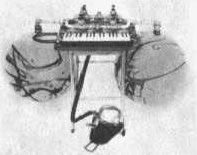
Manguelódica pneumática

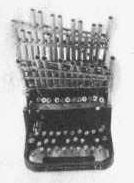
Dactilófono

== Musical stylings ==
Les Luthiers began writing humorous pieces primarily in a Baroque style, especially imitating vocal genres such as cantatas, madrigals and serenatas. Later, they diversified into humorous renditions of music in other genres, from romantic lieder and opera to pop, mariachi, rock and even rap. Their stage show is often intermingled with humorous skits, frequently involving absurd situations, the music and biography of fictional composer Johann Sebastian Mastropiero and a heavy reliance on fairly sophisticated puns and word play. Much of the humor derives from the basic contradictions between the formality and highly developed vocal and instrumental technique of classical musicians and the sheer silliness of their show. All members of the group provided their voices for the pigeons in the Latin American and Spanish dubbings of the 2008 Disney film, Bolt.

Les Luthiers have acknowledged the influence of Gerard Hoffnung and Peter Schickele in their work. "Professor" Schickele invented in 1965 the fictional character of P.D.Q. Bach, son of Johann Sebastian Bach. He also invented many unusual instruments based on real ones, in the same style of the group. He also used the fictional biography of his imaginary composer as a running gag in his musical act.

Mr. Hoffnung predated both acts, starting in 1956 the Hoffnung Music Festival and publishing many cartoons with imaginary instruments for a classical orchestra. Malcolm Arnold probably was the first person to write a parody of classical music using odd instruments when he wrote for a Hoffnung Concert the score of A Grand, Grand Overture, a piece for orchestra and vacuum cleaners dedicated to US President Herbert Hoover.

== The Group ==
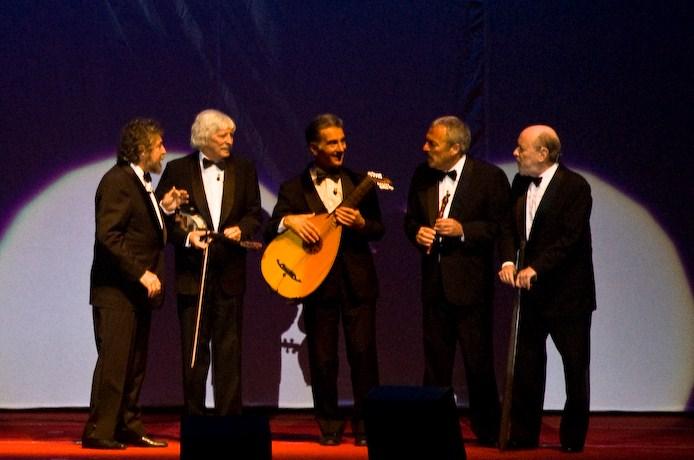
Left to right: Carlos Núñez Cortés, Carlos López Puccio, Jorge Maronna, Daniel Rabinovich, Marcos Mundstock.

=== Original members ===
These members actively shaped the group's works, excelling in lyrics, music, or instrument creation, and were part of its economic and business structure.

- Gerardo Masana: founder, composer, arranger, architect, and creator of early instruments; died of leukemia in 1973 at 36; played bass-pipe and dactilófono.
- Marcos Mundstock: professional announcer and copywriter; born May 25, 1942, in Santa Fe; presented works and acted, mainly singing or speaking, occasionally playing gom-horns, percussion, or keyboards; died April 22, 2020, in Buenos Aires at 77.
- Daniel Rabinovich: guitarist, percussionist, folk singer, lawyer, and notary; born November 18, 1943, in Buenos Aires; acted, sang, and played guitar, drums, latín, bass-pipe, and keyboards; authored Cuentos en serio and El silencio del final; died August 21, 2015, in Buenos Aires at 71.
- Jorge Maronna: composer, arranger, guitarist; born August 1, 1948, in Bahía Blanca; sang and played guitar and strings (charango, contrachitarrone); collaborated on books and the Colombian series Leche; only member present from 1967 to 2023.
- Carlos Núñez Cortés: PhD in chemistry, concert pianist, composer, arranger; born October 15, 1942, in Buenos Aires; played piano, tubófono, pan flute, glisófono, and percussion; co-created instruments; retired September 14, 2017, after 50 years.
- Carlos López Puccio: licensed in conducting, choir director, and professor; joined officially in 1971 after assisting since 1969; born October 9, 1946, in Rosario; played latín, cellato, piano, harmonica, violata, percussion, and synthesizers.

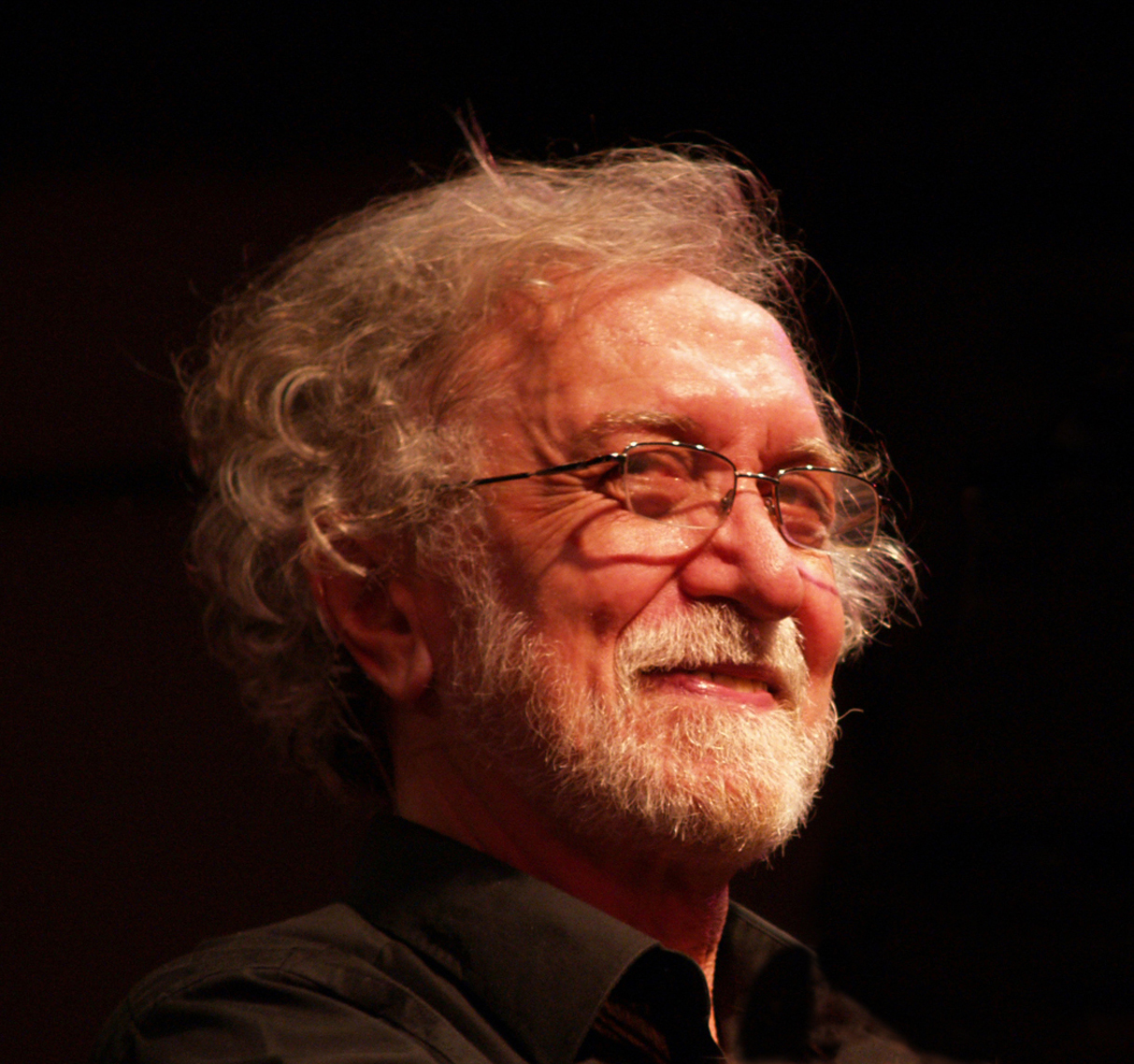
Ernesto Acher.

- Ernesto Acher: architect, composer, arranger; born October 9, 1939; played piano, winds (gom-horns, calephone, clarinet, horn, recorder, tubófono), drums, harmonium, and acted; left after the 1986 Bogotá Teatro Colón show; later co-founded a jazz group and conducted orchestras in Concepción and Santiago, Chile; died December 12, 2025 at 86.

=== Contracted members ===
These began as substitutes for absences, later becoming regular performers without creative or business roles.

- Horacio "Tato" Turano: pianist, saxophonist, singer, arranger, composer; born November 10, 1953, in Buenos Aires; substitute since 2000, full member from 2015 to 2023.
- Martín O'Connor: singer, actor; born August 2, 1966, in Buenos Aires; substitute since August 2012, full member from 2015 to 2023.
- Tomás Mayer-Wolf: pianist, composer, arranger, producer; born December 10, 1982, in Buenos Aires; substitute from 2015, full member from October 2017 to 2023.
- Roberto Antier: actor; born January 13, 1963, in Buenos Aires; tested in 2010, substitute from 2015, full member from 2020 to 2023 after replacing Mundstock.
- Santiago Otero Ramos: actor, pianist, choir and music director; born November 26, 1980, in Buenos Aires; substitute from August 2019.
- Pablo Rabinovich: multi-instrumentalist, singer, composer, producer, teacher, electronic engineer; born December 27, 1984, in Buenos Aires; no relation to Daniel Rabinovich; substitute from August 2019.

=== Collaborators ===
- Roberto "el Negro" Fontanarrosa: Rosario writer, contributed to numerous works.
- Carlos Iraldi: luthier until his 1995 death.
- Hugo Domínguez: luthier since 1997.
- Horacio Fontova: replaced Daniel Rabinovich in 1994 during a heart attack recovery.
- Gustavo López Manzitti: substitute 2000–2003; pianist, lyric singer, arranger, composer.
- Daniel Casablanca: actor, comedian from Los Macocos; substitute in 2008.
- Marcelo Trepat: actor, singer; substitute 2009–2012.

== Shows ==
=== I Musicisti ===
- ¿Música? Sí, claro (1966)
- Mens sana in corpore sano (1966)
- I Musicisti y las óperas históricas (1967)
- I Musicisti otra vez con lo mismo (1968)
- I Musicisti ataca de nuevo (1973)

=== Les Luthiers ===
- Les Luthiers cuentan la ópera (1967)
- Todos somos mala gente (TV program, 1968)
- Blancanieves y los siete pecados capitales (1969)
- Querida condesa (1969)
- Les Luthiers opus pi (1971)
- Recital '72 (1972)
- Recital sinfónico '72 (1972)
- Recital '73 (1973)
- Recital '74 (1974)
- Recital '75 (1975)
- Viejos fracasos (1976)
- Mastropiero que nunca (1977)
- Les Luthiers hacen muchas gracias de nada (1979)
- Los clásicos de Les Luthiers (1980)
- Luthierías (1981)
- Por humor al arte (1983)
- Humor dulce hogar (1985)
- Recital sinfónico '86 (1986)
- Viegésimo aniversario (1987)
- El reír de los cantares (1989)
- Les Luthiers, grandes hitos (1992)
- Unen canto con humor (1994)
- Bromato de armonio (1996)
- Todo por que rías (1999)
- Do-Re-Mi-Já! (2000)
- El grosso concerto (2001)
- Las obras de ayer (2002)
- Con Les Luthiers y Sinfónica (2004)
- Aquí Les Luthiers (2005)
- Los Premios Mastropiero (2005)
- Cuarenta años de trayectoria (2007)
- Lutherapia (2008)
- ¡CHIST! (2011)
- Viejos Hazmerreíres (2014)
- Gran Reserva (2017)
- Más tropiezos de Mastropiero (2022)

== Discography ==
=== Studio albums ===
- Sonamos, pese a todo (1971)
- Cantata Laxatón (1972)
- Volumen 3 (1973)
- Volumen 4 (1976)
- Volumen 7 (1983)
- Cardoso en Gulevandia (1991)

=== Live albums ===
- Mastropiero que nunca (1979)
- Les Luthiers hacen muchas gracias de nada (1981)
- Les Luthiers en vivos (2007)
- Les Luthiers más vivos (2013)

=== Tributes ===
- Muchas gracias Mastropiero (2007)

=== Collaborations ===
- 1998: Lo que me costó el amor de Laura
- 1999: Alma de Saxofón 4 Vientos
- 2004: Gerardo Masana y La Fundación de Les Luthiers
- 2004: Todos somos Chalchaleros 2008: 40 años de Cantos Opus 4
- 2009: Antigua Jazz Band

== Videography ==
Volume numbers reflect publication order, with recording years in parentheses.

- Volume 1: Mastropiero que nunca (1979)
- Volume 2: Hacen muchas gracias de nada (1980)
- Volume 3: Grandes hitos (1995)
- Volume 4: Bromato de armonio (1998)
- Volume 5: Unen canto con humor (1999)
- Volume 6: Humor dulce hogar (1986)
- Volume 7: Viegésimo aniversario (1989)
- Volume 8: Todo por que rías (2000)
- Volume 9: El Grosso Concerto (2001)
- Volume 10: Viejos fracasos (1977)
- Volume 11: Las obras de ayer (2002)
- Volume 12: Los Premios Mastropiero (2006)
- Volume 13: ¡Aquí Les Luthiers! (2005)
- Volume 14: Lutherapia (2009)
- Volume 15: ¡CHIST! (2013)
- Volume 16: Viejos hazmerreíres (2016)

Unofficial recordings for TV or archives, available on YouTube via fans or the official channel, include:

- Mastropiero que nunca (Chile, 1978)
- Hacen Muchas Gracias de Nada (Mexico, 1980)
- Luthierías (Colombia, 1981)
- Por Humor al Arte (1983)
- Humor Dulce Hogar (quintet version, 1987)
- Viegésimo aniversario (unpublished version, 1989)
- El reír de los cantares (1992)
- Do-Re-Mi-Já! (2000)
- Con Les Luthiers y Sin-fónica (2004)
- Festival de Música y Reflexión (2014)

== Official Bibliography ==
Since 1991's Les Luthiers de la L a la S by Daniel Samper, various books by or about the group or its members have been published:

- Samper Pizano, Daniel. (1991). Les Luthiers from L to S. Ediciones De la Flor, Argentina (Out of print) / Ediciones De la Flor. Argentina (Discontinued).
- Samper Pizano, Daniel. (1991). Les Luthiers from L to S. Editorial Lumen, Spain (Out of print).
- Maranca, Lucía. (1997). Carlos Iraldi: Luthier of Sounds. Asociación Cultural Pestalozzi, Argentina (Discontinued).
- Masana, Sebastián. (2004). Gerardo Masana and the Founding of Les Luthiers. Editorial Belacqva, Spain (Out of print).
- Masana, Sebastián. (2005). Gerardo Masana and the Founding of Les Luthiers. Editorial Norma, Argentina (Out of print).
- Samper Pizano, Daniel. (2007). Les Luthiers from L to S. Ediciones De la Flor, Argentina (Out of print).
- Samper Pizano, Daniel. (2007). Les Luthiers from L to S. Ediciones B, Spain (Out of print).
- Núñez Cortés, Carlos. (2007). Mastropiero's Games. Editorial Emecé, Argentina (Out of print).
- Núñez Cortés, Carlos. (2007). Mastropiero's Games. Editorial Península, Spain (Out of print).
- Horovitz, Gerardo & Les Luthiers. (2013). Les Luthiers: Gerardo Horovitz's Photos. Ediciones Lino Patalano, Argentina (Out of print).
- Samper Pizano, Daniel. (2014). Les Luthiers from L to S. Ediciones De la Flor, Argentina (Out of print).
- Núñez Cortés, Carlos. (2016). Mastropiero's Games. Editorial Península, Spain.
- Mendelevich, Pablo. (2017). Neneco: Daniel Rabinovich Beyond Les Luthiers. Editorial Planeta, Argentina (Out of print)
- Núñez Cortés, Carlos. (2017). Memoirs of a Luthier. Editorial Planeta, Argentina (Out of print).
- Maronna, Jorge & Samper Pizano, Daniel. (2017). The Private Life of Les Luthiers. Editorial Planeta, Argentina.
- Núñez Cortés, Carlos. (2023). Memoirs of a Luthier. Libros del Kultrum, Spain.
- Samper Pizano, Daniel & Grijelmo, Alex. (2024). Les Luthiers from L to S. Debate/PRH Grupo Editorial, Latin America.

== Awards ==
- 2017 Princess of Asturias Award for Communications and Humanities.
- 2011 Latin Grammy Lifetime Achievement Award

== Bibliography ==
- Guerrero, Juliana (2020). Música y humor en la obra de Les Luthiers [Music and Humor in the Work of Les Luthiers] (in Spanish). Santa Fe/Buenos Aires: UNL Ediciones/Eudeba. ISBN 978-987-749-176-0.
- Honrubia Martínez, Alfonso J. (2011). Aproximación al estudio sobre el impacto social y mediático de les Luthiers [Approach to the Study of the Social and Media Impact of Les Luthiers] (in Spanish). TFM. Master's in Hispanic Music, University of Salamanca.
- Honrubia Martínez, Alfonso J. (2017). Humor y música. Aproximación a las teorías del humor musical a través de Les Luthiers [Humor and Music: Approach to Theories of Musical Humor Through Les Luthiers]. DDEMPC. Thesis, Department of Didactics of Musical, Plastic, and Corporal Expression, University of Salamanca.
- Suárez, Bernardo (2007). Detrás de la risa [Behind the Laughter] (PDF) (Master's Thesis in Discourse Analysis). Faculty of Philosophy and Letters, University of Buenos Aires.
