= Jorge Maronna =

Argentine multi-instrumentalist (born 1948)

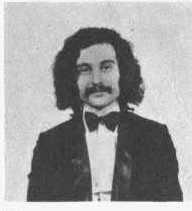
Jorge Maronna

Jorge Maronna is an Argentine multi-instrumentalist, composer, singer, author and a founding member of the comedy-musical group Les Luthiers. Born August 1, 1948, in Bahía Blanca, he joined I Musicisti while still a teenager, and helped Gerardo Masana and Carlos Iraldi build the first informal instrument, the "contrachitarrone da gamba", a blend between a guitar and a cello, and it's played like the latter one. In 1967, he was part of the four people who left I Musicisti and formed Les Luthiers. There, he and Masana composed most of the music for early shows, and to this day Maronna still pens many musical pieces for the group, often in collaboration with one of his bandmates.

As a member of Les Luthiers, he's been composer, lyricist, scriptwriter, and multi-instrumentalist, and he's also been conducting their rehearsals during the last years. He has reportedly played over 35 instruments for the group, including banjo, viola and bagpipes. Singing he normally did the lowest voice parts, specially when Marcos Mundstock wasn't singing.

In 1971 he began his creative collaboration with Carlos López Puccio, with whom, over several decades, he would write numerous works for Les Luthiers. Later, during the creation of the ensemble's shows, he actively participated in the organization and direction of the rehearsals.
