= Eugenio Bulygin =

Russian-Argentine jurist (1931–2021)

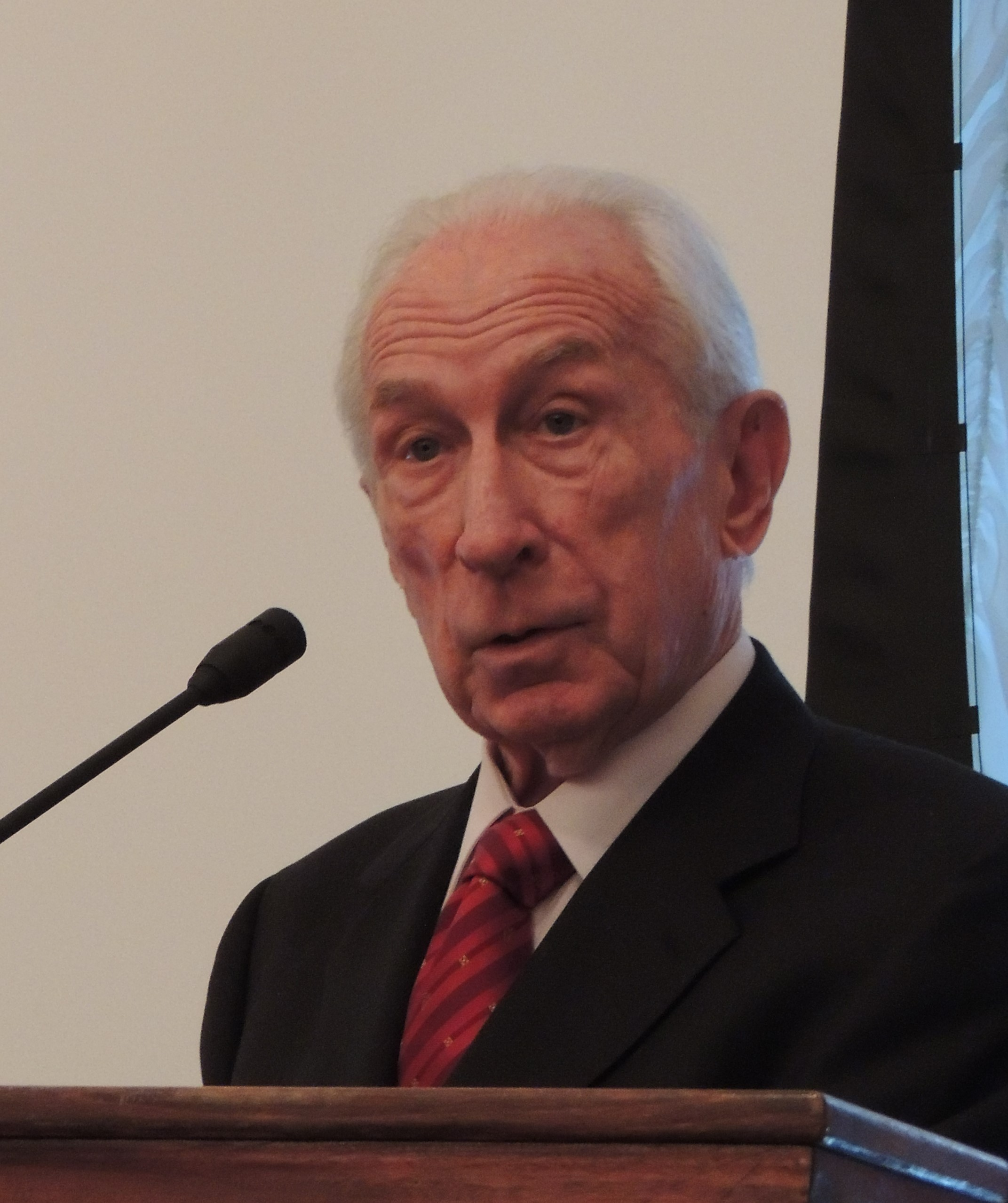
- Bulygin in 2013
- Born: Russian: Евгений Викторович Булыгин; July 25, 1931; Kharkov, Ukrainian SSR, Soviet Union
- Died: May 11, 2021 (aged 89); Buenos Aires, Argentina

Education
- Education: University of Buenos Aires (Abogado, 1958; PhD, 1963)
- Thesis: Validez y eficacia del derecho

Philosophical work
- Era: 20th-century philosophy
- Region: Western philosophy
- School: Legal positivism
- Institutions: University of Buenos Aires
- Main interests: Philosophy of law

Eugenio Bulygin, born Yevgeny Viktorovich Bulygin (Russian: Евгений Викторович Булыгин; July 25, 1931 – May 11, 2021) was a Russian Argentine jurist and legal philosopher. During a career that spanned over 60 years covering the second half of the 20th century and the first decades of the 21st century, Bulygin established himself as one of the main representatives of legal positivism in the Latin world.

== Biography ==
=== Early years ===
Bulygin was born in 1931 in the city of Kharkov, then part of the Soviet Union, to a Russian intelligentsia family. An only child, Bulygin was homeschooled (his mother Maria was a teacher) until the age of nine, when he was finally enrolled in public school. After the German invasion and occupation of Kharkov, in order to escape hunger in the city, Eugenio's family moved West into rural areas. When the tide of war turned decisively against the Germans, the Bulygin household, unwilling to remain under Stalin's rule (a brother of Eugenio's grandmother was arrested during the Great Terror, perishing in the camps), attempted to flee to Paris, but was stopped by the Germans and sent to Austria, where the family remained in a labour camp until the end of the war. While there, Bulygin learned German, and was eventually enrolled into school in Linz in 1946. By 1949, however, worried about the proximity of Soviet forces during the Allied occupation of Austria, the Bulygin family decided to move yet again, this time to Argentina.

=== University years ===
On his arrival to Argentina, Bulygin started learning Spanish by attending chess clubs, a game which he played at a good level during his youth, and which didn't require as much communicative effort as other means of socialising. More worryingly, however, he was greeted by the news that his studies in Austria were not recognised by the local authorities. Faced with this inconvenience, and pushed by his family to enrol into university, Bulygin was forced to pass the examinations corresponding to the five years of secondary school in the span of two and a half years, finally managing to enter the University of Buenos Aires (UBA) law school in 1953. While there, he became fascinated by the lectures of Ambrosio Gioja, who headed the Institute for Legal Philosophy (now known as the Instituto Ambrosio Gioja) at the UBA and introduced a young Bulygin to the works of Hans Kelsen. In 1956 he met and befriended Carlos Alchourrón, a fellow student, who would become his close associate for the next 40 years, until the end of Alchourron's life in 1996. In 1958 Bulygin graduated as an abogado and started teaching at the UBA. Simultaneously, he pursued his PhD studies, which he completed in 1963.

=== European years ===
Soon after receiving his doctorate, Bulygin was awarded a fellowship from the Humboldt Foundation to study in West Germany. In 1963-1964 he studied in Köln with Ulrich Klug and in Bonn with Hans Welzel. Not long after returning from Germany, Bulygin moved to the United Kingdom on yet another fellowship, this time from the British Council, to work under the supervision of H. L. A. Hart at Oxford University. While at Oxford, he furthered his eventually life-long friendship with Georg Henrik von Wright, whom he had met in 1968 when von Wright had visited the University of Buenos Aires, and also befriended Arthur Prior, J. L. Mackie and P. F. Strawson.

=== Return to Argentina ===
In 1970 Bulygin returned to Argentina for good, becoming professor of Philosophy of Law at the University of Buenos Aires that same year, a position he also held (concurrently) at the University of La Plata until 1980. Soon after, given the opposition of the military dictatorship (1966-1973) to their research within the university, and looking for an institutional framework to promote philosophical research, Bulygin and a handful of colleagues (some of whom had also studied at Oxford), founded the Sociedad Argentina de Análisis Filosófico (SADAF) in 1972. With the return of democracy to Argentina, Raúl Alfonsín named Bulygin dean of his alma mater in 1984, entrusting him with the process of "normalising" (the position was known as decano normalizador, literally "normalising dean") the work of the university after the military dictatorship (1976-1983). In addition to his position at the University of Buenos Aires, he also served as a judge in the Court of Appeals for civil matters between 1986 and 2001. In 1997 Bulygin became professor emeritus at the University of Buenos Aires, and in 1999 he was elected president of the International Association for the Philosophy of Law and Social Philosophy (IVR), a position he held until 2003. From 2007 until his death he held the position of honorary president of the IVR.

Eugenio Bulygin died on May 11, 2021, as a result of a COVID-19 infection.

== Personal life ==
Bulygin was married to Elvira, with whom he had children. Elvira is the sister of fellow Argentinian legal philosopher Ernesto Garzón Valdés, who was also the cultural attaché at the Argentinian embassy in Bonn during Bulygin's stay in Germany. He established long and deep friendships with legal philosophers from all over the world, among them his frequent collaborator Carlos Alchourrón, his aforementioned Oxford acquaintances Georg Henrik von Wright, Arthur Prior, J. L. Mackie and P. F. Strawson, as well as Ronald Dworkin, whom he also met at Oxford and described Bulygin as "the wonderful Russian".

In addition to his native Russian and his "adopted" first language, Spanish, Bulygin was fluent in German, English and Italian, and had working knowledge of French.

== Honours and awards ==
- Guggenheim Fellowship (1975)
- Humboldt Prize (1996)
- Honorary President of the IVR (2007)
- Konex Platinum Award for the Humanities (2016)
- Grand Officer of the Order of Liberty, Portugal (2016)
- Honorary doctorates from six universities, among them the Pompeu Fabra University and the University of Alicante

== Works by Eugenio Bulygin ==
Bulygin published (on his own or in co-authorship) over a dozen books and well over 100 journal articles in several languages. Among his most notable works are the following:

- Normative Systems, New York-Wien: Springer, 1971 (with Carlos E. Alchourrón)
- Análisis lógico y derecho, Madrid: Centro de Estudios Constitucionales, 1990 (with Carlos E. Alchourrón)
- El positivismo jurídico, México: Fontamara, 2006
- Essays in Legal Philosophy, Oxford: Oxford University Press, 2015
- Lógica deóntica, normas y proposiciones normativas, Madrid: Marcial Pons, 2018
