= International Association for the Philosophy of Law and Social Philosophy =

The International Association for the Philosophy of Law and Social Philosophy (IVR) is a learned society for science and was founded in 1909 as the "Internationale Vereinigung für Rechts- und Wirtschaftsphilosophie". It was renamed to "Internationale Vereinigung für Rechts- und Sozialphilosophie" in 1933. The IVR is the world's central academic organization for the study and advancement of legal and social philosophy. It is divided into 41 autonomous national sections.

The primary activities of the IVR include a World Congress every two years, publication of the international journal Archiv für Rechts- und Sozialphilosophie (ARSP), and the IVR Encyclopedia of the Philosophy of Law and Social Philosophy. The seat of IVR is in Wiesbaden, Germany. Notable academics who have served as president of the organization include Neil MacCormick (Scotland), Ulfrid Neumann (Germany), Enrico Pattaro (Italy), Eugenio Bulygin (Argentina), and Mortimer Sellers (U.S.).

== History ==
In 1907, Josef Kohler (1849–1919) and Fritz Berolzheimer (1869–1920) established the journal Archiv für Rechts- und Wirtschaftsphilosphie mit besonderer Berücksichtigung der Gesetzgebungsfragen ("Archive for Philosophy of Law and Economic Philosophy with special Regard to the Issues of Legislation"), published by Walther Rothschild (1879-1967), who had opened the Rothschild Publishing House in 1905, specialising in cultural studies and political philosophy. Arthur Kohler, son of Josef Kohler, wrote that: "Josef Kohler was a great inspirer and stimulator, though every detail had to be reviewed by him, and he entertained international connections and footing; Berolzheimer was particularly engaged in the details of editing and was a proficient organizer; Rothschild knew how to propagate expertly." The foundation of the "Archive" took place during a phase of revivification of the philosophy of law in Germany, which began at the end of the 19th century and continued to spread at the beginning of the 20th century.

Two years later, in 1909, Kohler and Berolzheimer established the International Association for the Philosophy of Law and Social Philosophy (IVR) (Internationale Vereinigung für Rechts- und Wirtschaftsphilosophie). 166 persons were listed as founding members of the IVR on 1 October 1909, primarily from Germany (96), Austria-Hungary (14), Netherlands (11), Switzerland (9), Italy (6), and Russia (6). According to its Statute of 1909, the IVR was chaired by three presidents: Fritz Berolzheimer as Managing President (Geschäftsleitender Vorsitzender), Carl Fürstenberg as Financial President (Vorsitzender für die Vermögensangelegenheiten), and Josef Kohler as Honorary President (Ehrenpräsident).

The Managing President was supported by an advisory committee of 40 members, who were in charge of advisory opinions for important matters, as well as a council of Honorary Councillors from 15 non-German nations (Ehrenrat der außerdeutschen Kulturstaaten). Among these were French sociologist Émile Durkheim, Ernesto Quesada from Buenos Aires, Clóvis Beviláqua from Rio de Janeiro, and Govindo Dàs from Benares. Nowadays the association is governed by its executive committee, which is chaired by the association's president. The president is elected by the members.

In 1933, Rothschild Publishing House ceased publishing the "Archive", as Rothschild himself was forced to withdraw from the publishing business and emigrate to the United States. In the same year the publishing house was removed from the index of Berlin booksellers, and the "Archive" was taken over by the Verlag für Staatswissenschaften und Geschichte (1933–38; "Publishing house for Political Sciences and History"), followed by the Albert Limbach Verlag (1938–1944).

== Structure ==
The association has over 2000 members worldwide, who are organized in 41 autonomous national sections:

- Argentina
- Australia
- Austria
- Belgium
- Brazil
- Bulgaria
- Canada
- Chile
- China (Jurisprudence Institute of the China Law Society – JICLS/IVR China)
- Colombia (Asociación colombiana de Filosofía)
- Costa Rica
- Croatia
- Czech Republic
- Denmark
- Finland
- France (Association Française de Philosophie du Droit and Société française pour la théorie et la philosophie juridiques et politiques)
- Germany
- Greece
- Honduras
- Iceland
- India
- Israel
- Italy
- Japan
- Lebanon
- Lithuania
- Mexico (Asociación Mexicana de Filosofía del Derecho – AMEFILDE)
- New Zealand
- Norway
- Poland (Stowarzyszenie Filozofii Prawa i Filozofii Społecznej – Sekcja Polska IVR)
- Portugal (ATFD ─ Associação Portuguesa de Teoria do Direito, Filosofia do Direito e Filosofia Social, established in 2008)
- Romania
- Russia
- Serbia
- Slovakia
- Slovenia
- South Africa
- South Korea
- Spain
- Sweden
- Switzerland
- Taiwan
- The Netherlands
- Turkey
- Ukraine
- United Kingdom
- United States
- Venezuela

== Past executive committees and presidents ==
The following persons have served as Presidents of the Association:

Executive Committee 1909

- Fritz Berolzheimer – Managing President 1909-1920
- Josef Kohler – Honorary President 1909-19
- Carl Fürstenberg – President of Finances 1909–?? (not later than 1924)

Executive Committee 1919/20-1933/34

- Peter Klein – Managing President 1919/20-25/26 (†1925)
- Carl Fürstenberg – President of Finances 1909–?? (not later than 1924)
- Walter Rothschild – President of Finances 1924–?? (not later than 1935)
- Friedrich von Wieser – Honorary President 1924-26 (†1926)
- Leopold von Wenger – Honorary President 1924-??
- Ernst Zitelmann – Honorary President 1921-23

Executive Committee 1925/26-1933/34

- Wilhelm Sauer – Managing President 1925/26-approx. 1935
- Götz Briefs – Vice President 1926-1933/34 (removed from office)

Executive Committee 1935-1944

- Carl August Emge – President 1935–1944

Executive committee 1948-1953

- Rudolf von Laun – First president 1948–53
- Wilhelm Szilasi – Second president 1948–53
- Ulrich Klug – Third president 1948–53

Executive Committee 1953-1957

- Julius Ebbinghaus – First president 1953–57
- Ulrich Klug – Second president 1953–57
- Wilhelm Szilasi – Third president 1953–57

Executive Committee 1957-1959

- Rudolf von Laun – President 1957-59
- Otto Brusiin – Vice president 1957-59
- Dieter Gunst – Schriftführer 1957-59

IVR Presidents 1959-83

- Rudolf von Laun – President 1959-63
- Peter Schneider – President 1963-67
- Alessandro Passerin d'Entrèves – President 1967-71
- Chaïm Perelman – President 1971-75
- Gray Dorsey – President 1975-79
- Paul Trappe – President 1979-83
- Aulis Aarnio – President 1983-87
- Alice Ehr-Soon Tay – President 1987-91
- Ralf Dreier – President 1991-95
- Enrico Pattaro – President 1995–99
- Eugenio Bulygin – President 1999–2003
- Alexander Peczenik – President 2003-05
- Marek Zirk-Sadowski – Acting president 2006-07
- Neil MacCormick – President 2007–09
- Yasutomo Morigiwa – Acting president 2009-2011
- Ulfrid Neumann – President 2011-2015
- Mortimer Sellers – President 2015–2019.

== Conferences ==
=== Old series conferences 1910–1926 ===
List of Old series conferences

- 1910 Berlin, Germany (first IVR Congress of old series)
- 1911 Darmstadt, Germany
- 1914 Frankfurt, Germany
- 1926 Berlin, Germany, Germany

=== New series conferences 1957–present ===
List of New series conferences

- 1957 Saarbrücken, Germany
- 1959 Vienna, Austria
- 1963 Istanbul, Turkey
- 1967 Gardone Riviera, Italy
- 1971 Brussels, Belgium
- 1973 Madrid, Spain
- 1975 Saint Louis, United States
- 1977 Sydney & Canberra, Australia
- 1979 Basel, Switzerland
- 1981 Mexico City, Mexico
- 1983 Helsinki, Finland
- 1985 Athens, Greece
- 1987 Kobe, Japan
- 1989 Edinburgh, Scotland / United Kingdom
- 1991 Göttingen, Germany
- 1993 Rejkjavik, Iceland
- 1995 Bologna, Italy
- 1997 Buenos Aires & La Plata, Argentina
- 1999 New York, United States
- 2001 Amsterdam, the Netherlands
- 2003 Lund, Sweden
- 2005 Granada, Spain
- 2007 Cracow, Poland
- 2009 Beijing, China
- 2011 Frankfurt, Germany
- 2013 Belo Horizonte, Brazil
- 2015 Washington D.C., United States
- 2017 Lisbon, Portugal
- 2019 Lucerne, Switzerland

== Bibliography ==
=== Founding documents ===
- Kohler, Josef / Berolzheimer, Fritz, Einführung, in: ARWP, Vol. 1, 1907/08, p. 1 f. Reprinted in: Ziemann (ed.), Archiv für Rechts- und Sozialphilosophie: Bibliographie und Dokumentation (1907-2009), 2010, p. 410 (Archives's Founding declaration from 1907).
- Kohler, Josef / Berolzheimer, Fritz, Die Begründung einer Internationalen Vereinigung für Rechts- und Wirtschaftsphilosophie samt den Gesetzgebungsfragen (I.V.R), in: ARWP, Vol. 3, 1909/10, p. 435-437. Reprinted in: Ziemann (ed.), Archiv für Rechts- und Sozialphilosophie: Bibliographie und Dokumentation (1907-2009), 2010, p. 410-412 (IVR's Founding declaration from 1909).

=== Selected bibliography ===
- Brockmöller, Annette (ed.), Hundert Jahre Archiv für Rechts- und Sozialphilosophie (1907-2007): Auswahl 14 bedeutender Aufsätze von Kelsen, Radbruch, Luhmann u.a. (Series: ARSP-Beiheft, Vol. 112), Stuttgart 2007 (Collection of articles published in the „Archive for Philosophy of Law and Social Philosophy“ from 1909 to 2007).
- Brockmöller, Annette & Hilgendorf, Eric (eds.), Rechtsphilosophie im 20. Jahrhundert – 100 Jahre Archiv für Rechts- und Sozialphilosophie. Beiträge der Arbeitstagung „Rechtsphilosophie im Wandel der Gesellschaft“ vom 25. bis 27. Oktober 2007 in Bielefeld (Series: ARSP-Beiheft Vol. 116), Stuttgart 2009.
- Brusiin, Otto, Zum 50jährigen Bestehen der internationalen Vereinigung für Rechts- und Sozialphilosophie, in: International Association for the Philosophy of Law and Social Philosophy. Vorträge des IVR-Kongresses 1959 in Wien (Series: ARSP-Beiheft Vol. 38, New Series Vol. 1), 1960, p. 1-12 (English Summary at 13-14).
- Kohler, Arthur, Von der Wiege des Archivs, in: ARWP Vol. 24 (1930/31), p. 3–6, Ziemann, p. 412-413. Reprinted in: Ziemann (ed.), Archiv für Rechts- und Sozialphilosophie: Bibliographie und Dokumentation (1907-2009), 2010.
- Lotze, Lothar & Schier, Walter, Fritz Berolzheimer und das ARSP, in: ARSP Vol. 73 (1987), p. 15–29.
- Mollnau, Karl A. (ed.), Die Internationale Vereinigung für Rechts- und Sozialphilosophie und ihre Zeitschrift: Bibliographie, Statuten, Wirkungsgeschichtliches (Series: ARSP-Beiheft, Vol. 38), Stuttgart 1989.
- Mollnau, Karl A., Einleitung. Verein einer Zeitschrift oder Zeitschrift eines Vereins?, in: Mollnau (ed.), Die Internationale Vereinigung für Rechts- und Sozialphilosophie und ihre Zeitschrift: Bibliographie, Statuten, Wirkungsgeschichtliches (Series: ARSP-Beiheft, Vol. 38), 1989, p. 7–15. Reprinted in: Ziemann (ed.), Archiv für Rechts- und Sozialphilosophie: Bibliographie und Dokumentation (1907-2009), 2010, p. 424-429.
- Mollnau, Karl A., Eine Liaison zwischen Rechtsphilosophie und Gesetzgebung. Skizze anhand der frühen Jahrgänge des Archivs für Rechts- und Wirtschaftsphilosophie, in: Sprenger (ed.), Deutsche Rechts- und Sozialphilosophie um 1900. Zugleich ein Beitrag zur Gründungsgeschichte der Internationalen Vereinigung für Rechts- und Sozialphilosophie (IVR) (Series: ARSP-Beiheft, Vol. 43), Stuttgart 1991, p. 111–120.
- Sprenger, Gerhard (ed.), Deutsche Rechts- und Sozialphilosophie um 1900. Zugleich ein Beitrag zur Gründungsgeschichte der Internationalen Vereinigung für Rechts- und Sozialphilosophie (IVR) (Series: ARSP-Beiheft, Vol. 43), Stuttgart 1991 (Collection of articles on the history of the IVR).
- Sprenger, Gerhard, Das Archiv für Rechts- und Sozial(Wirtschafts)philosophie als Zeit-Schrift des Rechtsdenkens 1907–1987, in: ARSP Vol. 73 (1987), p. 1–14. Reprinted in: Ziemann (ed.), Archiv für Rechts- und Sozialphilosophie: Bibliographie und Dokumentation (1907-2009), 2010, p. 414-423.
- Sprenger, Gerhard, 100 Jahre Rechtsphilosophie: eine Rückbesinnung entlang des 1907 gegründeten „Archiv für Rechts- und Wirtschaftsphilosophie“, in: Brockmöller & Hilgendorf (eds.), Rechtsphilosophie im 20. Jahrhundert – 100 Jahre Archiv für Rechts- und Sozialphilosophie (Series: ARSP-Beiheft Vol. 116), Stuttgart 2009, p. 9–35.
- Wellman, Carl, One Hundred Years of the IVR, in: ARSP Vol. 95, 2009, p. 1-13.
- Ziemann, Sascha, Archiv für Rechts- und Sozialphilosophie: Bibliographie und Dokumentation (1907-2009) (Series: ARSP-Beiheft, Vol. 123), Stuttgart 2010 (Bibliography on the „Archive for Philosophy of Law and Social Philosophy“).
