= Law school =

Institution specializing in legal education

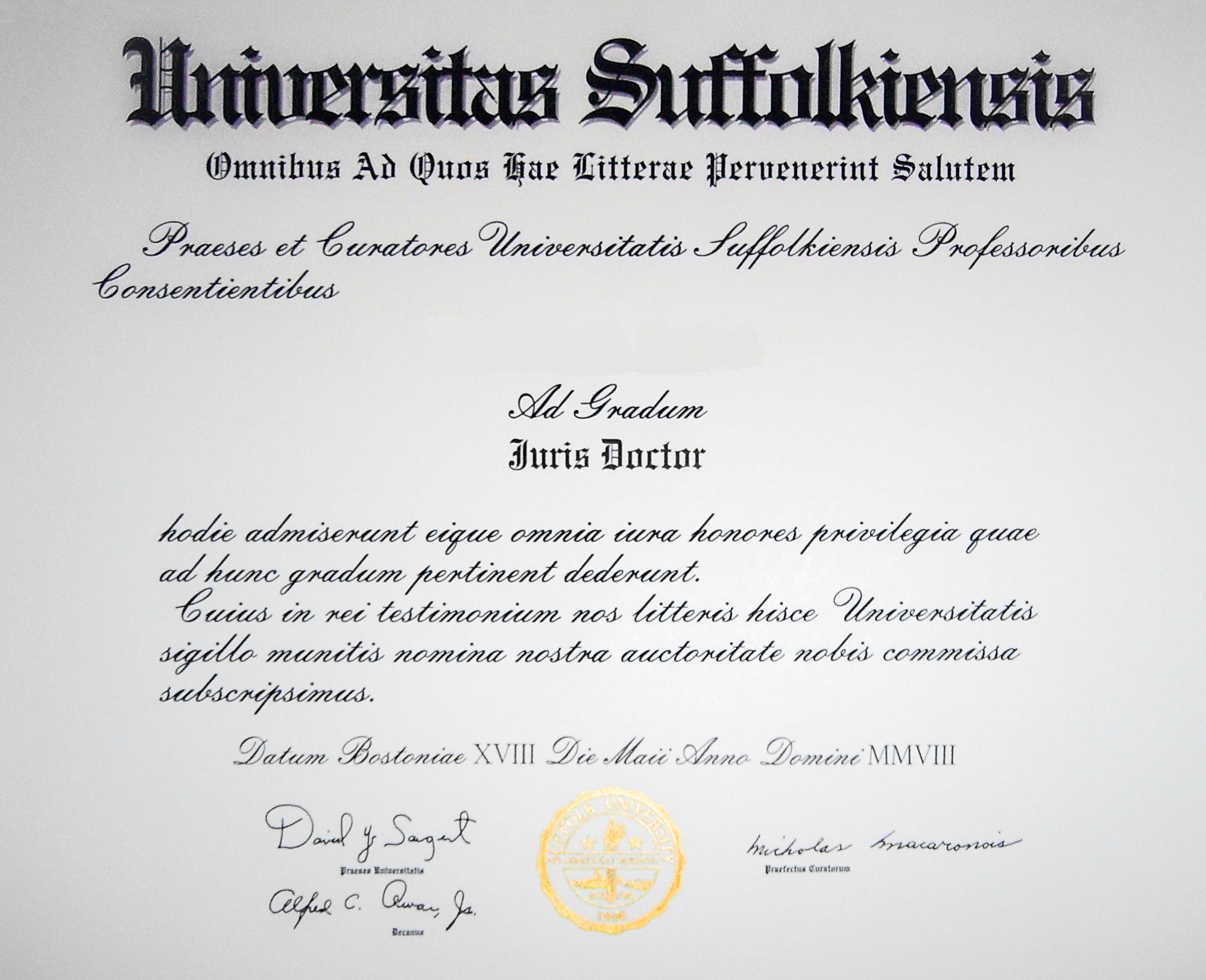
A typical juris doctor diploma, here from Suffolk University Law School in Boston.

A law school (also known as a law centre/center, college of law, or faculty of law) is an institution, professional school, or department of a college or university specializing in legal education, usually involved as part of a process for becoming a judge, lawyer, or other legal professional within a given jurisdiction. Depending on the country, legal system, or desired qualifications, the coursework is undertaken at undergraduate, graduate, or both levels.

== Law degrees ==
=== Argentina ===
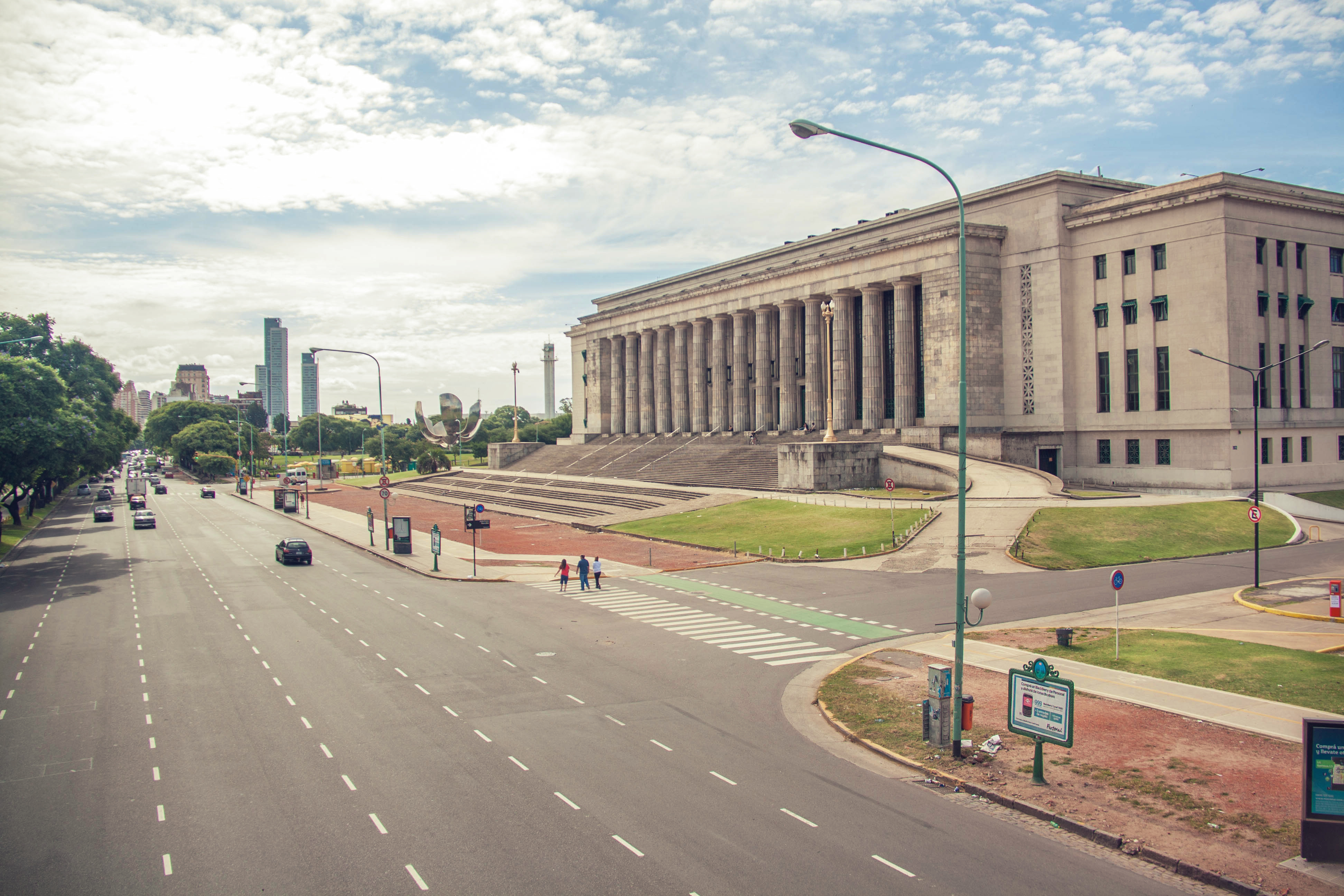
Faculty of Law of the University of Buenos Aires

In Argentina, lawyers-to-be need to obtain an undergraduate degree in law in order to practice the profession, as opposed to the US system in which a law degree is not obtained until successfully completing a postgraduate program. In spite of that, it is customary to call Argentine lawyers 'doctors,' although the vast majority of them do not hold a Juris Doctor degree. The reason lies in that the career was originally called 'Doctorate in Laws' (Doctorado en Leyes), which was an undergraduate degree. There were no graduate studies available in the country at the time of its creation, and they would be instituted only in 1949. After the university reform of 1918 the career was renamed 'Attorney'. It is five–six years long, some universities also offering intermediate degrees called 'University Bachelor in Law,' commonly taking three–four years to complete.

=== Australia ===
To practice in Australia, one needs to graduate with a Bachelor of Laws (LLB), Juris Doctor (JD), or Diploma-in-Law issued by the Legal Profession Admission Board, followed by an internship for 12 months or an extra course in practical legal training (PLT) depending on the jurisdiction and university, and be admitted as a lawyer of one of a state's Supreme Court.

=== Belgium ===
In Belgium, the admission to the Belgian Bar is permitted after a 5-year law degree.

=== Brazil ===
In Brazil, the legal education begins between 1827/28 in Olinda/PE and São Paulo/SP where the first schools of law were established by the new Empire using the Coimbra Faculty of Law as an educational model.

The current legal education consists of a 5-year-long course after which the scholar is granted a bachelor's degree.

The practice of law is conditioned upon admission to the bar of a particular state or other territorial jurisdiction (Ordem dos Advogados do Brasil - OAB).

Before practicing as public attorneys, public prosecutors or magistrates (judges), candidates must successfully pass an entrance examination and complete a constitutionally-mandated three years of legal experience. Second degree courts and higher must have at least one-fifth of their judges be members of a lawyers' association, and also from federal/state/labour prosecutors (ministério público) regarding the court jurisdiction. Electoral and military courts do not have this requirement.

After achieving the bachelor's degree in law, it is possible to specialize (lato sensu) or to follow an academic law path (stricto sensu), or both.

The stricto sensu postgraduate program consists of a master's degree, which is usually a two-year degree, followed by a doctorate degree, which can take up to another four years.

=== Canada ===
The oldest civil law faculty in Canada offering law degrees was established in 1848 at McGill University in Montreal, and the oldest common law faculty in Canada offering law degrees was established in 1883 at Dalhousie University in Halifax. The typical law degree required to practice law in Canada is now the Juris Doctor, which requires previous university coursework and is similar to the first law degree in the United States. There is some scholarly content in the coursework (such as an academic research paper required in most schools). The programs consist of three years, and have similar content in their mandatory first year courses. Beyond first year and the minimum requirements for graduation, course selection is elective with various concentrations such as business law, international law, natural resources law, criminal law, Aboriginal law, etc.

Given that the Canadian legal system includes both the civil law and the common law, some law schools offer both an LL.B. or J.D. (common law) and a B.C.L., LL.L. or LL.B. (civil law) degree, such as McGill University, University of Ottawa and the Université de Montréal. In particular, McGill University Faculty of Law offers a combined civil law and common law program, which has been called "transsystemic". At other faculties, if a person completes a common law degree, then a civil law degree can be obtained with only an extra year of study. This is also true for civil law graduates who wish to complete a common law degree.

Despite changes in designation, schools opting for the J.D. have not altered their curricula. Neither the J.D. or LL.B. alone is sufficient to qualify for a Canadian license, as each province's law society requires an apprenticeship and successful completion of provincial skills and responsibilities training course, such as the British Columbia Law Society's Professional Legal Training Course, the Law Society of Upper Canada's Skills and Responsibilities Training Program. and the École du Barreau du Québec.

The main reason for implementing the J.D. in Canada was to distinguish the degree from the European counterpart that requires no previous post-secondary education, However, in the eyes of the Canadian educational system, the J.D. awarded by Canadian universities has retained the characteristics of the LL.B. and is considered a second entry program, but not a graduate program. (This position is analogous to the position taken by Canadian universities that the M.D. and D.D.S. degrees are considered second entry programs and not graduate programs.) Nevertheless, disagreement persists regarding the status of the degrees, such as at the University of Toronto, where the J.D. degree designation has been marketed by the Faculty of Law as superior to the LL.B. degree designation.

Some universities have developed joint Canadian LL.B or J.D. and American J.D programs, such as York University and New York University, the University of Windsor and the University of Detroit Mercy, and the University of Ottawa and Michigan State University program.

=== Finland ===
Law school is usually entered to at the undergraduate level in a university. There is an intermediate bachelor's degree (oikeusnotaari), but the target is the master's degree in law (oikeustieteen maisteri; until 2005 oikeustieteen kandidaatti). Once university education is complete, the title of varatuomari (VT) is obtained with a one-year externship in a district court. This is the basic qualification to practice law as a judge. With further experience, the candidate may be admitted to the Finnish Bar Association and licensed with the legally protected title asianajaja, similar to barrister.

=== France ===
In France, the legal education is a three tier system. The student may study for an LL.B. (licence de droit), then an LL.M. (master de droit) and, for those interested in Law theory, a PhD in law (doctorat de droit).

Many French universities offer Law courses in departments labelled as Research and Education Units (unité de formation et de recherche) and/or Faculties of Law or Law Schools (Toulouse school of law).

An LLM-level is a prerequisite for some legal professions, but is combined with vocational education, such as the école nationale de la magistrature for judges and the Certificat d'aptitude aux fonctions d'avocat for advocates.

=== Hong Kong ===
In Hong Kong, which generally follows the English common law system, an undergraduate L.L.B. is common, followed by a one or two year Postgraduate Certificate in Laws before one can begin a training contract (solicitors) or a pupillage (barristers). All three law schools (HKU, CUHK, CityU) in Hong Kong also offer 2-year Juris Doctor programme allowing students with a bachelor's degree in any field to be considered for PCLL.

=== Indonesia ===
Law Degree in Indonesia consists of three tier systems. The first tier is the Degree of which carries the title of Sarjana Hukum/S.H. (Bachelor of Law). This can be obtained in 4–7 years after they enter Law School straight from Senior High School.

The second tier varies depending on the legal specialties taken after the first tier. The general title for this tier is Magister Hukum / M.H. (Master in Law). Although it is also common to see other title for secondary tier such as Magister Kenotariatan / M.Kn. (Master in Notary) for Notarial professionals line of work. The second tier can be obtained normally in 1-2 year.

The third tier in Indonesian Law Degree is Doctor / DR. (Doctor in Law).

To work in legal professions of choice in Indonesia, a Bachelor Law Degree (S.H.) is obligatory. Graduates can pursue their career as Legal in-house counsel, Judge profession (requires admission and further training at Supreme Court Educational Center), Public Prosecutor (requires admission and further training at Public Prosecutor Educational and Training Center), other legal-related work and Advocate.

To become an Advocate, Law Graduate should attend an Advocate Special Course (1–2 months) and pass the Bar exam. The title Advocate can be obtained after a graduate passes the Bar exam and fulfill several obligation and requirements created by the Indonesian Advocates Association (PERADI), and is a prerequisite for practicing trial law in Indonesia.

=== India ===
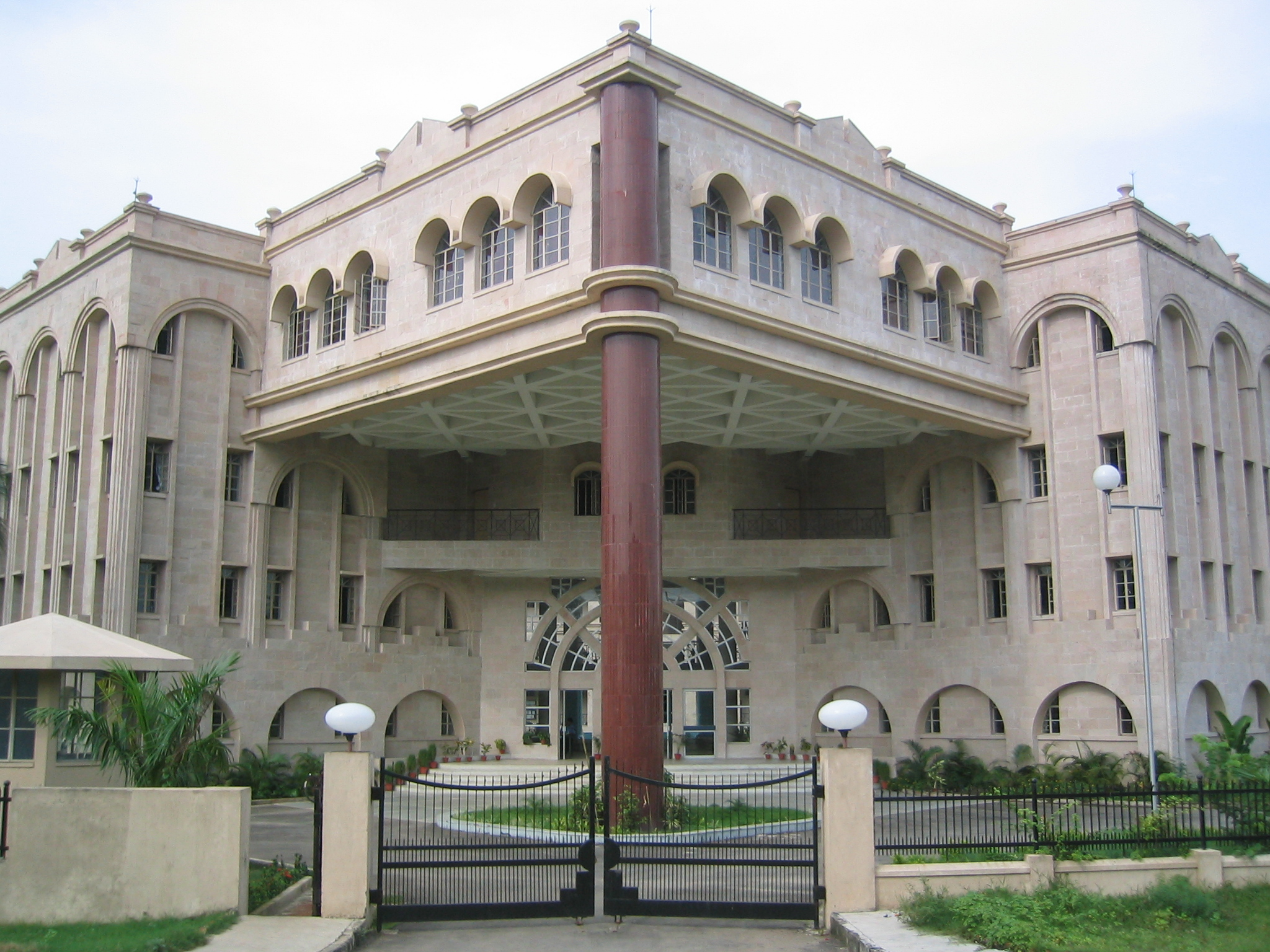
West Bengal National University of Juridical Sciences, in Kolkata is one of the autonomous law schools in India

The oldest law school in India dates back to 1855, with the establishment of the Government Law College, Mumbai. In India, legal education has been traditionally offered as a three-year graduate degree. However, the structure has been changed since 1987. Law degrees in India are granted and conferred in terms of the Advocates Act, 1961, which is a law passed by the Parliament both on the aspect of legal education and also regulation of conduct of legal profession. Under the act, the Bar Council of India is the supreme regulatory body to regulate the legal profession in India and also to ensure the compliance of the laws and maintenance of professional standards by the legal profession in the country.

To this regard, the Bar Council of India prescribes the minimum curriculum required to be taught in order for an institution to be eligible for the grant of a law degree. The Bar Council also carries on a periodic supervision of the institutions conferring the degree and evaluates their teaching methodology and curriculum and having determined that the institution meets the required standards, recognizes the institution and the degree conferred by it.

Traditionally the degrees that were conferred carried the title of LL.B. (Bachelor of Laws) or B.L. (Bachelor of Law). The eligibility requirement for these degrees was that the applicant already have a Bachelor's degree in any subject from a recognized institution. Thereafter the LL.B. / B.L. course was for three years, upon the successful completion of which the applicant was granted either degree.

However, upon the suggestion by the Law Commission of India and also given the prevailing cry for reform, the Bar Council of India instituted upon an experiment in terms of establishing specialized law universities solely devoted to legal education and thus to raise the academic standards of legal profession in India. This decision was taken somewhere in 1985 and thereafter the first law University in India was set up in Bangalore which was named as the National Law School of India University (popularly 'NLS'). These law universities were meant to offer a multi-disciplinary and integrated approach to legal education. It was therefore for the first time that a law degree other than LL.B. or B.L. was granted in India. NLS offered a five-year law course, upon the successful completion of which an integrated degree with the title of "B.A., LL.B. (Honours)" would be granted.

Thereafter, other law universities were set up, all offering five-year integrated law degrees with different nomenclature. The next in line was National Law Institute University set up in Bhopal in 1997. It was followed by NALSAR university of law in 1998. The Guru Gobind Singh Indraprastha University in Delhi offered a five-year integrated law degree course of LL.B (Honours) from 1998 and subsequently from 2007 started to award the B.A., LL.B / B.B.A.LL.B (Honours). The Mysore University School of Justice set up by the University of Mysore in Mysore offered a five-year integrated law degree course of B.A., LL.B (Honours) from 2007. The course for three years LL.B. is also regularized in University of Delhi as an option for post graduation after the completion of graduation degree. The National Law University, Jodhpur offered for the first time in 2001 the integrated law degree of "B.B.A, LL.B. (Honours)" which was preceded by the West Bengal National University of Juridical Sciences offering the "B.Sc., LL.B. (Honours)" degree. Gujarat National Law University established in Gandhinagar also offers LL.B.

However, despite these specialized law universities, the traditional three-year degree continues to be offered in India by other institutions and are equally recognized as eligible qualifications for practicing law in India. Another essential difference that remains is that while the eligibility qualification for the three year law degree is that the applicant must already be a holder of a bachelor's degree, for being eligible for the five years integrated law degree, the applicant must have successfully completed Class XII from a recognized Boards of Education in India.

Both the holders of the three-year degree and of the five-year integrated degree are eligible for enrollment with the Bar Council of India upon the fulfillment of eligibility conditions and upon enrollment, may appear before any court in India.

=== Iran ===
In Iran, the legal education has been influenced both by civil law and Islamic Shari'ah law. Like many countries, after high school, one can enter the law school. The first law degree is Bachelor of Science. It takes about four years to get B.S. The first graduate program in law is M.S. It takes about two to three years to earn a Master of Science. The Master of Science is a mix of course work in a specific field of law and a dissertation. The Ph.D. in law is the highest law degree offered by some law schools. It takes about 5–7 years depending on the school as well as the students.

=== Italy ===
In Italy, the route for obtaining a legal education to qualify as a practicing lawyer is via a 5-year Master of Laws (LL.M.) degree. Law school is usually started at the undergraduate level.

=== Japan ===
In Japan, legal education is undertaken at both undergraduate and postgraduate level. Admission to postgraduate law schools does not require specialization in law in undergraduate degree.

=== Philippines ===
Law degree programs are considered graduate programs in the Philippines. As such, admission to law schools requires the completion of a bachelor's degree, with a sufficient number of credits or units in certain subject areas.

Graduation from a Philippine law school constitutes the primary eligibility requirement for the Philippine Bar Examination, the national licensure examination for practicing lawyers in the country. The bar examination is administered by the Supreme Court of the Philippines during the month of September every year.

As of 2011 the bar examinations were held during November.

The University of Santo Tomas Faculty of Civil Law was the first secular faculty, and hence the oldest law school in the Philippines.

=== Singapore ===
In Singapore, the primary route for obtaining a legal education to qualify as a practicing lawyer is via a 4-year Bachelor of Laws (LL.B.) degree from either the NUS Faculty of Law, or the SMU School of Law. The SUSS School of Law is aimed primarily at producing law graduates focused on family law and criminal law, as there is a pressing need for lawyers practicing in these areas.

Additionally, the SMU School of Law offers the 3-year Juris Doctor degree for aspiring candidates who have already completed a prior undergraduate course of study and who have been awarded a bachelor's degree in another field. The SMU J.D. is recognised for qualification to the Singapore Bar.

There are several private law schools in Singapore that are run by private education providers and which also award the Bachelor of Laws degree. These private law schools are neither recognised nor supported by the government and their graduates are, in the vast majority of cases, ineligible for qualification to the Singapore Bar.

=== Serbia ===
In Serbia, prospective students are required to pass an admission test for enrollment in a law school. The legal education is a three tier system – 4-year bachelor's degree studies, 1-year Master of Law and 5-year doctoral studies. The Belgrade Law School is the most distinguished and largest by capacity in Serbia. Courses are offered in Serbian and English.

=== South Korea ===
On July 3, 2007, the Korean National Assembly passed legislation introducing 'Law School', closely modeled on the American post-graduate system. Moreover, naturally, since March 2, 2009, 25 (both public and private) 3-year professional Law Schools that officially approved by Korean Government, has been opened to teach future Korean lawyers. The first bar test to the lawschool graduates was scheduled in 2012.

=== Sri Lanka ===
In Sri Lanka to practice law, one must be admitted and enrolled as an Attorney-at-Law of the Supreme Court of Sri Lanka. This is achieved by passing law exams at the Sri Lanka Law College, which are administered by the Council of Legal Education and spending a period of six months under a practicing attorney of at least 8 years standing. To undertake law exams students must gain admission to the Sri Lanka Law College and study law or directly undertake exams after gaining an LL.B. from a local or foreign university.

=== Sweden ===
In Sweden, the route for obtaining a legal education to qualify as a practicing lawyer is via a 4 1/2-year Master of Laws (LL.M.) degree (270 ECTS).

=== Taiwan ===
In Taiwan, law is primarily studied as an undergraduate program resulting in a Bachelor of Law (B.L.). Students receive academic rather than practical training. Practical training is arranged after the individual passes the lawyer, judge, or prosecutor exams.

A degree in law (bachelor, master or doctor) is one way to qualify to sit for the bar examination. You can also sit for the bar examination if you do not have a law degree, but have taken the requisite number and type of law courses.

The bar examination is administered in two written stages. Stage one exam subjects are tested by multiple-choice format and stage two exam subjects are tested in an essay format. Candidates who fail stage one are disqualified from taking stage two, and the "passed" status of the stage one exam will not be retained for future exams. The yearly pass rate for the bar examination in Taiwan hovers around 10% each year. The bar exam is conducted in Chinese, so a native level of language fluency is expected.

A non-citizen may take the Attorney Qualification Examination. According to Articles 5 and 20 of the Regulations on Attorney Qualification Examination (Bar Exam), non-citizens are allowed to participate in the bar examination with a degree in law earned in Taiwan. Non-citizens are not allowed to sit in the prosecutor or judge examinations unless they are naturalized citizens of Taiwan. Once a non-citizen is approved to practice law in Taiwan, they must abide by all statutes related to the legal practice, Codes of Legal Ethics, and the Articles of Incorporation of the Bar Association to which they are members.

=== Ukraine ===
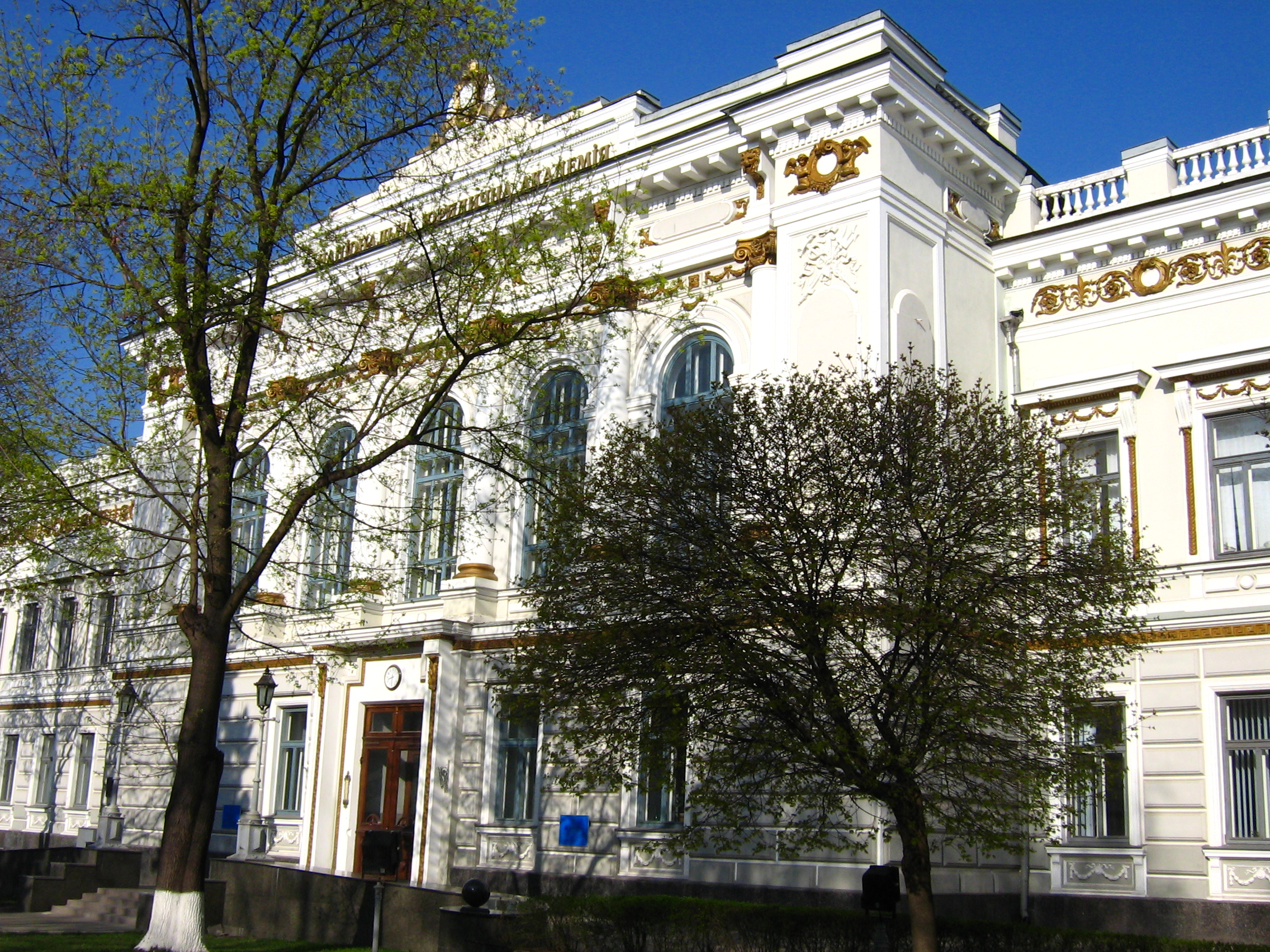
The main building of Yaroslav Mudryi National Law University in Kharkiv, Ukraine

In Ukraine, in order to enter the legal profession, an applicant after graduation is required to pass an External independent evaluation. Legal education is a 4-year bachelor's degree and a 1-year master's degree in law. Law schools are represented by a number of law faculties within national universities, as well as specialized higher education institutions such as: Yaroslav Mudryi National Law University and National University Odesa Law Academy.

=== United States ===
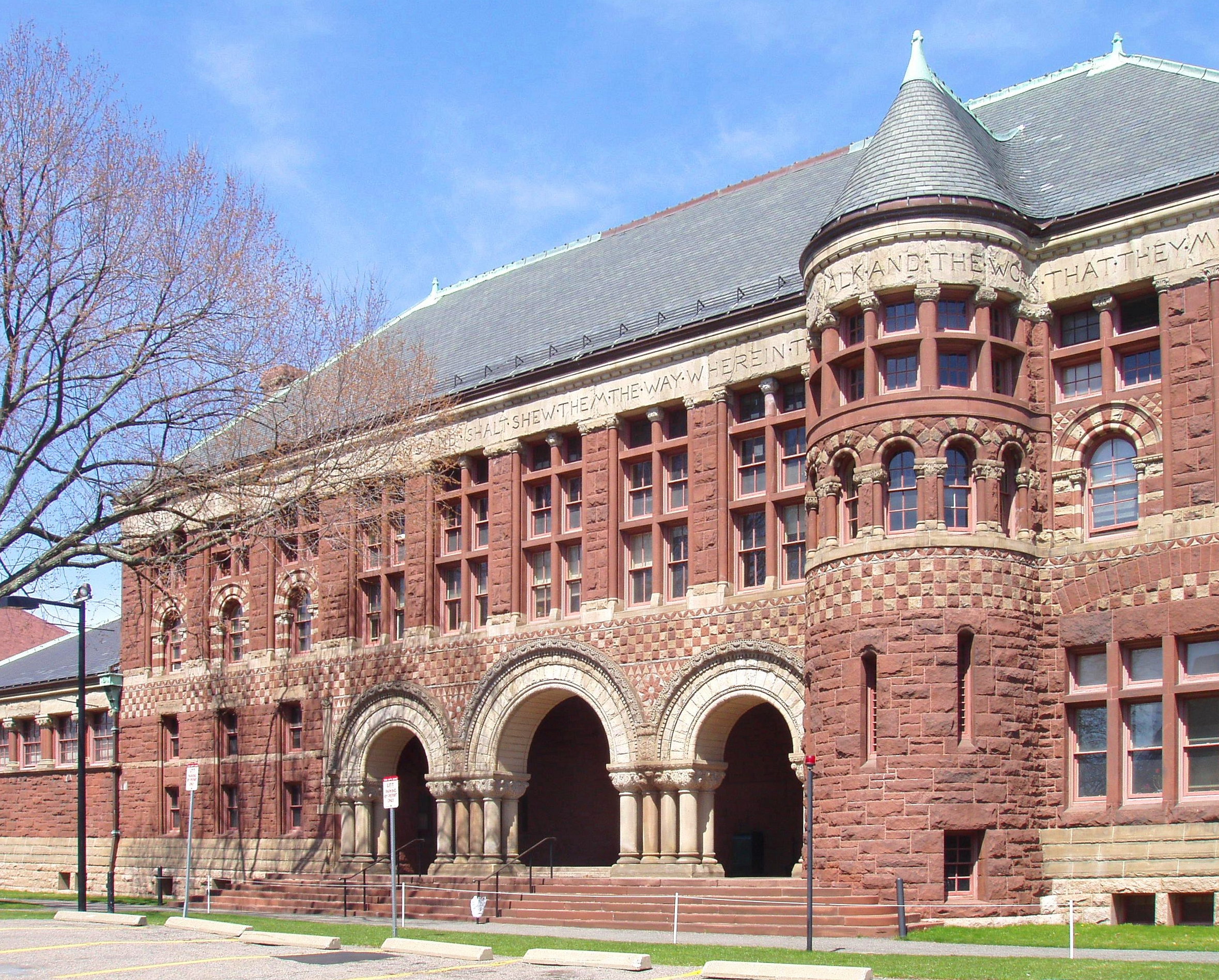
Founded in 1817, Harvard Law School is the oldest continuously operating law school in the United States.

In the United States, law school is a postgraduate program lasting three years and resulting in the conferral upon graduates of the Juris Doctor (J.D.). Some schools in Louisiana concurrently award a Graduate Diploma in Civil Law (D.C.L.). To gain admission to a law school that is accredited by the American Bar Association (ABA), applicants must usually take the Law School Admission Test (LSAT), and have an undergraduate (bachelor's) degree in any major. Currently, there are 203 ABA-approved law schools that grant the J.D. degree. There currently are eight law schools that are unaccredited by any state bar or the ABA but registered by the State Bar of California, 21 law schools approved solely by the State Bar of California, 2 law schools accredited solely by statute in Alabama and 1 law school accredited solely by the Massachusetts Department of Higher Education. Non-ABA approved law schools have much lower bar passage rates than ABA-approved law schools, and do not submit or disclose employment outcome data to the ABA. However, as of 2020, 10 ABA-accredited law schools were out of compliance with its bar passage standard.

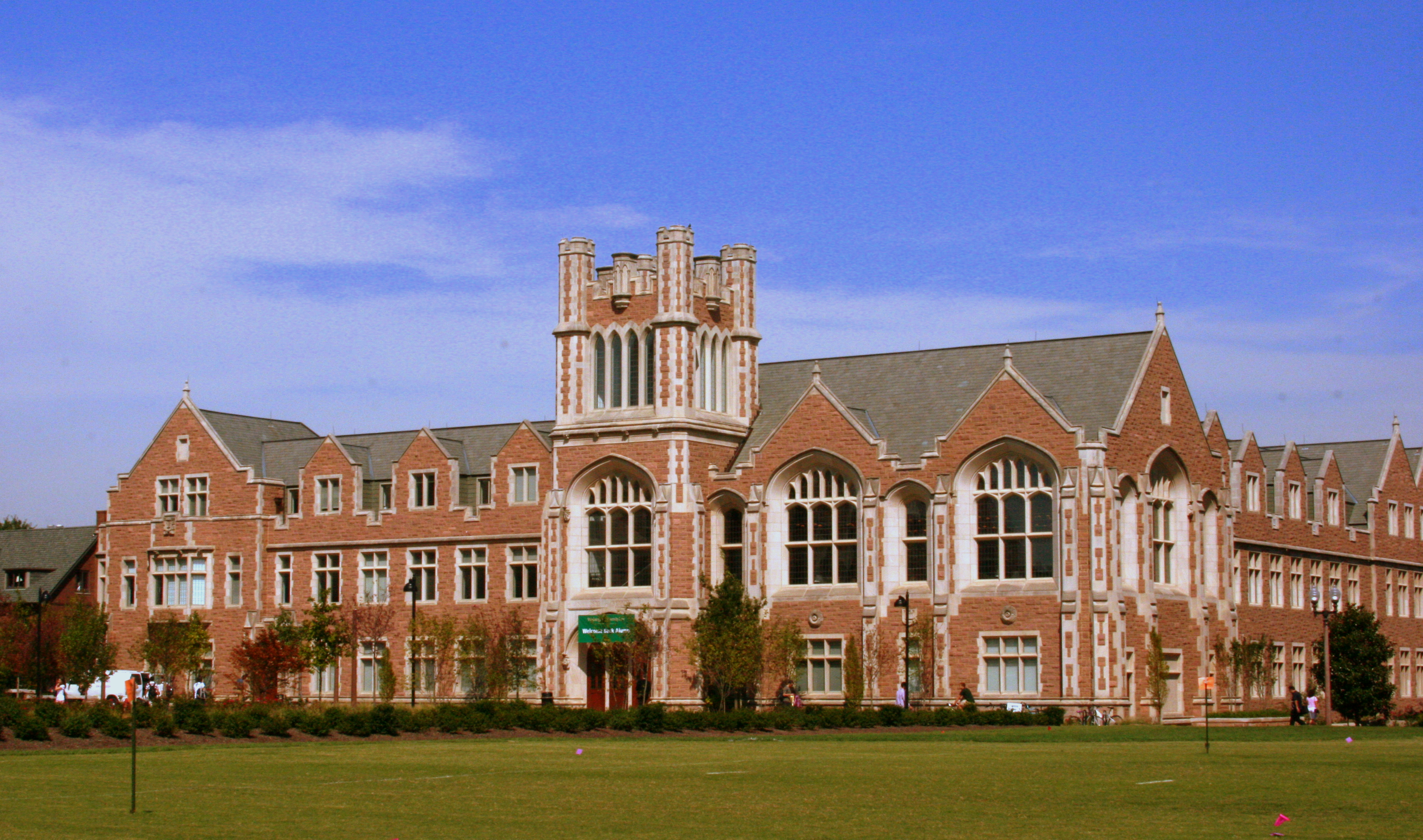
In 1869, Washington University School of Law became the first chartered law school in America to admit women.

According to a study by labor economists Michael Simkovic and Frank McIntyre, a Juris Doctor degree increases the present value of lifetime earnings in the U.S. by $1,000,000 compared to a bachelor's degree. According to the United States Department of Labor, Bureau of Labor Statistics, the national average salary for lawyers in 2012 was above $130,000, albeit in a bimodal distribution. Salaries vary by geography, with higher average salaries in big cities—especially New York, Washington, D.C., Chicago, and Los Angeles—and lower salaries in rural areas. An unpublished table produced by the U.S. Bureau of Labor Statistics shows that unemployment rates among experienced lawyers are lower than those for most high-income occupations. BLS data also suggests that lawyer employment has grown slightly faster than other occupations, with lawyers comprising a growing share of the work force over the last decade.

However, not all recent law graduates work as lawyers. According to Simkovic and McIntyre's study of U.S. Census Bureau data, around 40 percent of U.S. residents with law degrees do not practice law. Law graduates are disproportionately represented in leadership positions in business and government. The National Association for Legal Career Professionals produces an annual report summarizing the employment of recent graduates of U.S. law schools 9 months after graduation. Employment at that point is typically around 90 percent, although from 2009 to 2011, the numbers have been lower, at around 86 to 88 percent. Approximately 2 percent of graduates were employed in non-professional jobs. Approximately 75 to 85 percent work in jobs classified by NALP as "JD required" or "JD preferred", and another 5 percent work in other professional jobs. However, a law degree increases earnings, even including those who do not practice law.

While certain law schools are starting to accept the GRE, the majority of law schools require applicants to take the Law School Admissions Test (LSAT). However, due to the COVID-19 pandemic, the Law School Admission Council initiated the LSAT-Flex.

== Postgraduate and professional study ==
Some schools offer a Master of Laws (LL.M.) program as a way of specializing in a particular area of law. A further possible degree is the academic doctoral degree in law of Doctor of Juridical Science (S.J.D.) (in the U.S. or Canada)., or the Doctor of Laws (LL.D.) in Canada or the UK, or the Ph.D. in law from European or Australasian universities.

In addition to attending law school, many jurisdictions require law school graduates to pass a state or provincial bar examination before they may practice law. The Multistate Bar Examination is part of the bar examination in almost all United States jurisdictions. Generally, the standardized, common law subject matter of the MBE is combined with state-specific essay questions to produce a comprehensive bar examination.

In other common law countries the bar exam is often replaced by a period of work with a law firm known as articles of clerkship.

== Alternative legal education systems ==
=== UK and Europe ===
While law schools in the U.S. and Canada are typically post-graduate institutions with considerable autonomy, legal education in other countries is provided within the mainstream educational system from university level and/or in non-degree conferring vocational training institutions.

In countries such as the United Kingdom and most of continental Europe, academic legal education is provided within the mainstream university system starting at the undergraduate level, and the legal departments of universities are simply departments like any other rather than separate "law schools". In these countries, the term "law school" may be used, but it does not have the same definition as it does in North America. The same is true for private Law Schools, e.g. in Germany two private law schools have been established, Bucerius Law School in Hamburg and EBS Law School in Wiesbaden which are termed law schools but follow the usual German path of legal education.

There are also sometimes legal colleges that provide vocational training as a post-academic stage of legal education. One example is the University of Law in the United Kingdom, which provides certain professional qualifications lawyers in England and Wales must obtain before they may practice as solicitors or barristers.

=== Australia ===
In Australia, law schools such as the Melbourne Law School, the Adelaide Law School, and the Sydney Law School have emphasised a combination of the British and American systems. However, other universities such as the University of New South Wales, the Australian National University and Monash University are known for their practical work.

== See also ==
- Law School Admissions Test
- Legal clinic
- Moot court
- Madrasa
- Paralegal
