= Gray Dorsey =

Gray L. Dorsey (died July 20, 1997) was an American law professor. He was professor emeritus of international law at the School of Law at Washington University in St. Louis, and had been the Charles Nagel Professor of Jurisprudence in International Law. He had also been president of the International Association for the Philosophy of Law and Social Philosophy.

He was the subject of a festschrift, Law, culture, and values: essays in honor of Gray L. Dorsey.

Dorsey was born in Hamilton, Missouri.

== Books ==
- Sava Alexander Vojcanin, ed. (1990). Law, culture, and values : essays in honor of Gray L. Dorsey. New Brunswick, N.J., U.S.A.: Transaction Publishers. p. 300. ISBN 0-88738-305-X.
- Validation of new forms of social organization; edited by authorization of the American Section of the International Association for Philosophy of Law and Social Philosophy (AMINTAPHIL) by Gray L. Dorsey and Samuel I. Shuman.
- Bar Association of St. Louis. Constitutional freedom and the law. Sponsored by Bar Association of St. Louis in cooperation with School of Law, Washington University, and School of Law, St. Louis University. Project directors and consulting editors: Gray L. Dorsey [and] John E. Dunsfor 1965
- American freedoms : an essay on the Bill of rights / by Gray L. Dorsey. [Buffalo, N.Y.] : W. S. Hein, 1974.
- Beyond the United Nations : changing discourse in international politics and law / Gray L. Dorsey. Lanham : University Press of America, c1986. ISBN 0-8191-5652-3 (hardcover), ISBN 0-8191-5653-1 (paperback)
- Cases and materials on international law and social change, by Gray L. Dorsey. 1973
- Cases and materials on international law and social change, by Gray L. Dorsey. 1971
- Jurisculture / Gray Dorsey. 1989
- Jurisculture: law and social change, by Gray L. Dorsey. St. Louis, Mo. 1972-
- Law of conflict, by Gray L. Dorsey. 1973
- World Congress on Philosophy of Law and Social Philosophy (7th : 1975 : St. Louis, Mo.) Equality and freedom, international and comparative jurisprudence : papers of the World Congress on Philosophy of Law and Social Philosophy, St. Louis, 24–29 August 1975 / edited by authorization of Internationale Vereinigung für Rechts- und Sozialphilo
