= Attorney at law =

Lawyer, in some jurisdictions

Attorney at law or attorney-at-law, usually abbreviated in everyday speech to attorney, is the preferred term for a practising lawyer in certain jurisdictions, including Poland, South Africa (for certain lawyers), Sri Lanka, the Philippines, and the United States. The term has its roots in the verb to attorn, meaning to transfer one's rights and obligations to another.

== England and Wales and Ireland ==
The attorney, in the sense of a lawyer who acts on behalf of a client, has an ancient pedigree in English law. The Statute of Merton 1235 uses the Latin expression attorñ in a phrase rendered into English by The Statutes of the Realm as

It is provided and granted that every freeman, which oweth suit to the county, trything, hundred, and wapentake, or to the court of his Lord, may freely make his attorney to do those suits for him.

The term was formerly used in England and Wales and Ireland for lawyers who practised in the common law courts. They were officers of the courts and were under judicial supervision. Attorneys did not generally actually appear as advocates in the higher courts, a role reserved (as it still usually is) for barristers. Solicitors, lawyers who practised in the courts of equity, were considered to be more respectable than attorneys and by the mid-19th century many attorneys were calling themselves solicitors.

The Supreme Court of Judicature Act 1873 in England and Wales and the Supreme Court of Judicature Act (Ireland) 1877 in Ireland redesignated all attorneys as solicitors. The term persists in legal usage in the United Kingdom solely in the instance of patent attorneys, who are legal professionals having sat professional qualifications and are expert in acting in all matters and procedures relating to patent law and practice. They may, or may not, be additionally either solicitors or barristers or have come to the practice through a technical expert route (e.g. following a PhD and period of practice in a scientific or engineering field).

In the now three separate jurisdictions of England and Wales, Ireland, and Northern Ireland, references in any enactment to attorneys, with the exception of patent attorneys, must be construed as references to solicitors.

The chief legal adviser to the Sovereign and Government in affairs pertaining to England and Wales is called the Attorney-General.

== Poland ==
In Poland, it is used as a free profession of public trust dealing with the provision of legal aid, in particular providing legal advice and consultations, drafting legal opinions, drafting legal acts, and appearing before courts and offices as a proxy or defence counsel. It is carried out on the basis of the Law of 6 July 1982 on attorney-at-law. In addition to the obligations arising from the law, every attorney-at-law and trainee attorney-at-law is also subject to the ethical standards of the attorney-at-law profession, defined in particular in the Code of Ethics for Attorney-at-Law.

== See also ==
- Attorneys in Japan
- Attorneys in Sri Lanka
- Attorneys in the United States
- Attorneys in South Africa
- Attorney-in-law (Poland)
- Title of Attorney (Argentina)
