= Alessandro Passerin d'Entrèves =

Italian philosopher

Alessandro Passerin d'Entrèves (also known in French as Alexandre and in English as Alexander; and sometimes referred to as Passerin d'Entrèves et Courmayeur; and known professionally in English as A. P. D'Entreves) (Turin, 26 April 1902 – 15 December 1985) was an Italian philosopher and historian of law. He was noted for his scholarship on political thought, particularly in the mediaeval and early modern period, and natural law theory.

== Early life ==
D'Entreves was a native of the Aosta Valley, Northern Italy.

== Education ==
He undertook university studies (including a thesis on Hegel) at the University of Turin. He then undertook a doctorate (awarded 1932) at the University of Oxford.

At Oxford, his thesis was on mediaeval political thought and the constitutionalism of Richard Hooker. He was then briefly a professor at Messina, before going to Pavia and then Turin.

D'Entreves was involved in the Italian resistance during World War II in the Aosta Valley.

He was Serena Professor of Italian at Oxford from 1946 to 1957. While at Oxford, D'Entreves was a member of the Oxford Dante Society. He taught at least one course at Harvard (Spring 1957).

In 1969, he was among the founders of the Political Science Faculty of the University of Turin, of which he later became the first president. D'Entreves was president of the International Association for the Philosophy of Law and Social Philosophy from 1967 to 1971.

His most notable books include The Medieval Contribution to Political Thought, Thomas Aquinas, Marsilius of Padua, Richard Hooker (Oxford University Press) (1939); Natural Law: An Introduction to Legal Philosophy (1951) (regarded as a classic study of the subject); Dante as a Political Thinker (Oxford University at the Clarendon Press)(1952); and The Notion of the State: An Introduction to Political Theory (OUP, 1967).

His hobbies included alpinism, and he also had "a deep interest in and love of music" and was an "avid collector of classical records".
