= Josef Kohler =

German jurist, author and poet (1849–1919)

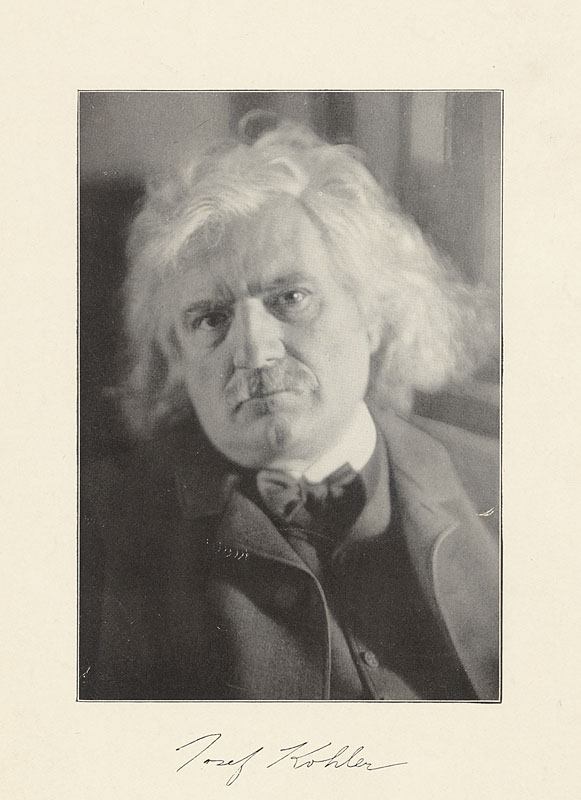
Josef Kohler; by Rudolf Dührkoop.

Josef Kohler (9 March 1849 – 3 August 1919) was a German jurist, author and poet.

== Biography ==
Kohler was born in Offenburg. He studied at Offenburg and Rastatt gymnasiums and Freiburg and Heidelberg universities. He became Doctor of Laws (1873) and was appointed judge at Mannheim (1874). He was a professor at Würzburg (1878) and Berlin (1888). Through his many contributions to the Zeitschrift für vergleichende Rechtswissenschaft and other law journals he aided much in advancing the comparative history of law.

Kohler died in Charlottenburg, aged 70.

== Literary works ==
=== Journals ===
- Zeitschrift für vergleichende Rechtswissenschaft (editor)
- Archiv für Rechts- und Wirtschaftsphilosophie (editor)
- Archiv für bürgerliches Recht und Berliner juristische Beiträge (founder with Viktor Ring)

=== Comparative history of law ===
- Moderne Rechtsfragen bei islamitischen Juristen (Würzburg 1885)
- Das chinesische Strafrecht (Würzburg 1886)
- Rechtsvergleichende Studien über islamitisches Recht, das Recht der Berbern, das chinesische Recht und das Recht auf Ceylon (Berlin 1889)
- Altindisches Prozessrecht (Stuttgart 1891)

=== Civil law ===
- Deutsches Patentrecht (Mannheim 1878)
- Das Autorrecht (Jena 1880)
- Beiträge zur germanischen Privatrechtsgeschichte (Würzburg 1883-88)
- Das Recht des Markenschutzes (Würzburg 1885)
- Der Prozess als Rechtsverhältnis (1888)
- Aus dem Patent- und Industrierecht (Mannheim 1888)
- Forschungen aus dem Patentrecht (Mannheim 1888)
- Das literarische und artistische Kunstwerk und sein Autorschutz (Mannheim 1892)
- Zur Urgeschichte der Ehe (1897)
- Handbuch des deutsches Patentrechts (Mannheim 1900-01)
- Einführung in die Rechtswissenschaft (Leipzig 1902)
- Leitfaden des deutschen Konkursrechts (Stuttgart 1903)
- Kunstwerkrecht (1908)

=== Philosophy of law ===
- Shakespeare vor dem Forum der Jurisprudenz (Würzburg 1883)
- Das Recht als Kulturerscheinung (Würzburg 1885)
- Das Wesen der Strafe (Würzburg 1888)
- Lehrbuch der Rechtsphilosophie (1908)

=== International law ===
- Grundlagen des Völkerrechts (1918)

=== History of art ===
- Aus dem Lande der Kunst (Würzburg 1882)
- Aesthetische Streifereien (Mannheim 1889)
- Zur Charakteristik Richard Wagners (Mannheim 1893)

=== Poetry ===
- Lyrische Gedichte und Balladen (Berlin 1892)
- Feuermythus oder Apotheose des Menschengeistes; nach Motiven der polynesischen Sage (Berlin 1893)
- Der Liebestod: nach motiven der mexikanischen Ueberlieferung (Berlin 1893)
- Neue Dichtungen (Berlin 1895)
- Melusine, a dramatic poem (1896)
- Dantes Heilige Reise (Cologne 1901-03)
- Aus Petrarcas Sonettenschatz (Berlin 1902-03)

== See also ==
- Japanese patent law
