= Ernesto Garzón Valdés =

Argentine philosopher (1927–2023)

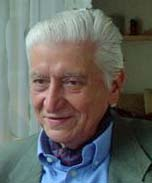
Garzón Valdés in 2006

Ernesto Garzón Valdés (17 February 1927 – 19 November 2023) was an Argentine philosopher.

He had been a professor of philosophy of law at the universities of Córdoba and La Plata in Argentina and, upon being exiled in Germany during the administration of Isabel Perón and the subsequent dictatorship in Argentina, at the universities of Bonn, Cologne and Mainz. He worked at the embassy of the Republic of Argentina in Bonn as a cultural attaché and as plenipotentiary minister until 1974, when he was expelled from the diplomatic service for political reasons. He then taught legal philosophy at Bonn and Cologne, until he gained a chair in political science at Johannes Gutenberg University in Mainz in 1981. He had been a visiting professor at various European and Latin American Universities.

The Universities of Córdoba (Argentina), Palermo (Argentina), Valencia (Spain), Helsinki (Finland), Santa Fe (Argentina), Valparaiso (Chile), Alicante (Spain), Buenos Aires, and Pompeu Fabra (Barcelona, Spain) have awarded him the title of Doctor honoris causa.

Broadly speaking, his work can be described as a political theory with foundations in legal philosophy. He was a classic liberal, who especially cared about the universal protection of the individual against despotism of state authorities. This perspective is not only manifested in his disaffirmation of group-related rights but also in the rejection of cultural relativism. He wanted to clearly separate rights from arbitrary definitions made by state authorities. Topics like the relationship between the rule of law and paternalism and tolerance appealed to him even before they received widespread attention. His choice of topics had probably been influenced by his own experiences with Argentine politics.

Garzón Valdés died on 19 November 2023, at the age of 96.

== Works ==
- (1970): Derecho y «naturaleza de las cosas». Análisis de una nueva versión del derecho natural en el pensamiento jurídico alemán contemporáneo, Universidad de Córdoba, Córdoba.
- (1987): El concepto de estabilidad de los sistemas políticos, CEC, Madrid. Reeditado en México, Fontamara, 1992.
- (1988): Die Stabilität politischer Systeme. Analyse des Begriffs mit Fallbeispielen aus Lateinamerika, Alber, Friburgo/Múnich.
- (1993): Derecho, ética y política, CEC, Madrid.
- (1999): Instituciones suicidas, Paidós, México.
- (2000): El velo de la ilusión: Apuntes sobre una vida argentina y su realidad política, Ed. Sudamericana, Buenos Aires.
- (2001): Filosofía, política, derecho: escritos seleccionados, ed. a cargo de J. de Lucas, Universidad de Valencia, Valencia
- (2003): Tolleranza, responsabilità e Stato de diritto. Saggi di filosofia morale e politica, trad. ita. de P. Comanducci y T. Mazzarese, il Mulino, Bologna.
- (2004): Calamidades, Gedisa, Barcelona.
- (2005): Por qué estoy aquí. Tres justificaciones y una excusa, Universidad Nacional, La Rioja.
- (2006): Tolerancia, dignidad y democracia, Universidad Inca Garcilaso del la Vega, Lima.
- (2011): Propuestas, Trotta, Madrid.

== Articles in English ==
- On justifying legal paternalism, Ratio Juris (Oxford) 3 (March 1990) 1 bis, p. 173-184.
- Basic Needs, Legitimate Wants and Political Legitimacy in Mario Bunge's Conception of Ethics, in P. Weingartner/G. J. W. Dorn (eds.), Studies on Mario Bunge's Treatise, Amsterdam & Atlanta, GA 1990, p. 471-487.
- The Argentine Military and Democracy, in Academia de Ciencias de Polonia, Instituto de Historia (ed.), Contemporary Societies in a Comparative Perspective: Eastern Europe and Latin America in the 20th Century (= Estudios Latinoamericanos 14), parte II, Warsaw 1992, p. 93-107.
- Constitution and Stability in Latin America, in W. Krawietz, N. MacCormick y G. H. von Wright (eds.), Prescriptive Formality and Normative Rational¬ity in Modern Legal Systems, Festschrift for Robert S. Summers, Berlin: Duncker & Humblot 1994, p. 549-572.
- Some Remarks on Bulygin's "Cognition and Interpretation of Law", in Letizia Gianformaggio y Stanley I. Paulson (eds.), Cognition and interpretation of law, Turin: G. Giappichelli 1995, p. 277-284.
- Legal Security and Equity, in Aulis Aarnio, Kauko Pietilä, Jyrki Uusitalo (ed.), Interests, Morality and the Law, University of Tampere, Research Institute for Social Sciences, 14/1996, p. 15-32.
- More on the relation between Law and Morality, in: Aulis Aarnio, Kauko Pietilä, Jyrki Uusitalo (ed.), Interests, Morality and the Law, University of Tampere, Research Institute for Social Sciences, 14/1996, p. 123-143.
- Reasonableness as a Criterion of Moral Correctness?, in Georg Meggle (ed.), Actions, Norms, Values: Discussions with Georg Henrik von Wright, Berlin: de Gruyter 1998, p. 245-254.
- The Concept of Corruption, Associations, 1 (1997), p. 103-125.
- On the Concept of Legitimacy of a Political System, Associations, Vol. 2 (1998), Nº 1, p. 55-62.
- Two Models of Legal Validity: Hans Kelsen and Francisco Suárez, in Stanley L. Paulson y Bonnie Litscheweski Paulson (eds.) Normativity and Norms. Critical Perspectives on Kelsenian Themes, Oxford: Clarendon Press 1998, p. 263-271.
- Some Reflections on the Concept of Equality, in Associazione italiana dei costituzionalisti (ed.), Annuario 1998, p. 3-20.
- Dictatorship and Punishment: a Reply to Scanlon and Teitel, in Harold Hongju Koh and Ronald C. Slye (eds.), Deliberative Democracy and Human Rights, New Haven/London 1999, p. 291-300.
- Democratic consensus: foundation and limits of the role of minorities, in Werner Krawietz, Robert S. Summers, Ota Weinberger, Georg Henrik von Wright (eds.), The Reasonable as Rational. Festscrift for Aulis Aarnio, Berlin: Duncker & Humblot 2000, p. 367-384.
- Hypocrisy, Sympathy and the Rule of Law, Associations 4 (2), 2000, p. 167-189.
- What is wrong with the rule of Law?, in SELA 2000, Estado de derecho y democracia, Buenos Aires: Editores del Puerto 2001, p. 61-83.
- Optimism and Pessimism about Democracy, in The Tampere Club (ed.), The Future of Democracy, Tampere: Aamulehti 2003, p. 8-35.
- Intimacy, Privacy and Publicity, Analyse & Kritik, 1/2003, p. 17-40.
- Responding to Extraordinary Violence, Associations, Vol. 7, 2003, N. 2, p. 291-311.
- Some Thoughts on Globalization and Democracy, in Ruth Zimmerling (ed.), Globalisation and Democracy, Tampere: University Press 2005, p. 37- 43.
- Democracy and Representation, in Geoffey Brennan (ed.), Preconditions of Democracy, Tampere: University Press 2006, p. 127-145
