= Fritz Berolzheimer =

German philosopher of law

Fritz Berolzheimer, Juris Doctor (3 January 1869 – 30 September 1920) was a German philosopher of law. He was the author of the five volume System der Rechts- und Wirtschaftsphilosophie (1904–07). In 1907 he co-founded the Archiv für Rechts- und Wirtschaftsphilosophie (ARWP).

== Principal works ==
- Rechtsphilosophische Studien (Munich, 1903)
- Die Entgeltung im Strafrecht (Munich, 1903)
- System der Rechts- und Wirtschaftsphilosophie (Munich, 1904–07)
  - Volume 1. Kritik des Erkenntnisinhaltes (Munich, 1904)
  - Volume 2. Die Kulturstufen der Rechts- und Wirtschaftsphilosophie (Munich, 1905)
  - Volume 3. Philosophie des Staates samt den Grundzügen der Politik (Munich, 1906)
  - Volume 4. Philosophie des Vermögens einschliesslich des Handelsverkehrs (Munich, 1907)
  - Volume 5. Strafrechtsphilosophie und Strafrechtsreform (Munich, 1907)
- Deutschland von Heute (Berlin, 1909)
- Die Gefahren einer Gefühlsjurisprudenz in der Gegenwart (Berlin, 1911)
- The World's Legal Philosophies (Modern Legal Philosophy Series, Vol. 2), Lawbook Exchange Ltd 2002, ISBN 1-58477-255-7

=== Berolzheimer texts online ===
- Fritz Berolzheimer, Rachel Szold Jastrow (1912). The World's Legal Philosophies. The Boston Book Company. "Fritz Berolzheimer."
