= Title of Attorney (Argentina) =

Law degree in Argentina

The Title of Attorney (Spanish: Título de Abogado), prefix: Abog. is an undergraduate degree given to law students in Argentina. After 5 to 6 years of studying law, it grants the applicant with a professional degree that allows them to practice their profession as a lawyer anywhere in the jurisdiction of Argentina.

== See also ==
- Attorney at law
- Doctor of Law (Argentina)
- Doctor of Juridical Science (Argentina)
