= List of Argentine poets =

This list of Argentine poets links birth and death years to corresponding "[year] in poetry" articles:

== A ==
- Florencia Abbate (born 1976)
- Javier Adúriz (born 1948)
- Felipe Aldana (1922–1970)
- Carlos Alvarado-Larroucau (born 1964)
- Hilario Ascasubi (1807–1875)

== B ==
- Enrique Banchs (1888–1968)
- Carlos Barbarito (born 1955)
- Martín del Barco Centenera (1535 – c. 1602) Spanish cleric, explorer, author and poet
- Nemer ibn el Barud (1925-??)
- Francisco Luis Bernárdez (1900–1978)
- Ivonne Bordelois (born 1934)
- Jorge Luis Borges (1889–1986)
- Delfina Bunge (1881-1952)

== C ==
- Susana Calandrelli (1901–1978)
- Arturo Carrera (born 1948)
- Leonardo Castellani (1899–1981)
- Vicenta Castro Cambón
- Emeterio Cerro (1952–1986)
- Andrés Chabrillón (1882–1928)
- Claudio Mamerto Cuenca (1812–1852)
- Pascual Contursi (1888–1932)
- Gabino Coria Peñaloza (1881–1975)
- Humberto Costantini (1924–1987)
- Washington Cucurto (born 1973)

== D ==
- Fernando Demaría (born 1928)
- Juana Dib (1924-2015)
- Alejandro Dolina (born 1944)

== F ==
- Ángel Faretta (born 1953)
- Jacobo Fijman (1898–1970)
- Juan de Dios Filiberto
- Jorge Fondebrider (born 1956)

== G ==
- Gastón Gori
- Juan Gelman (born 1930)
- Joaquín Giannuzzi
- Oliverio Girondo
- Alberto Girri
- Eduardo González Lanuza
- Raúl González Tuñón
- Ricardo Güiraldes

== H ==
- José Hernández (1834–1886)

== J ==
- Roberto Juarroz (1925–1995)

== L ==
- Ana Emilia Lahitte
- Leónidas Lamborghini
- Osvaldo Lamborghini
- Norah Lange
- Anahí Lazzaroni (1957–2019)
- Jorge Ángel Livraga Rizzi
- Francisco López Merino
- Esteban de Luca
- Leopoldo Lugones (1874–1938)

== M ==
- Leopoldo Marechal (1900–1970)
- Carlos Mastronardi (1901–1976)
- Ricardo Ernesto Montes i Bradley (1905–1976)

== N ==
- Conrado Nalé Roxlo
- Andrés Neuman (born 1977)

== O ==
- Rafael Obligado (1851–1920)
- Olga Orozco (1920–1999)
- Juan Laurentino Ortiz (1896–1978)

== P ==
- Pedro Bonifacio Palacios (1854–1912)
- José Pedroni (1899–1968)
- Aldo Pellegrini (1903–1973)
- Néstor Perlongher (1949–1992)
- Ulyses Petit de Murat (1907–1983)
- Alejandra Pizarnik (1936–1972)
- Sixto Pondal Ríos (1907–1968)
- Antonio Porchia (1885–1978)

== R ==
- José Rivera Indarte
- Mario Romero

== S ==
- Roberto Jorge Santoro (1939–1977)
- Rafael Squirru (born 1925)
- Alfonsina Storni (1892–1938)

== T ==
- María Dhialma Tiberti (1928–1987)
- Mario Trejo (born 1926)

== U ==
- Paco Urondo (1930–1976)

== V ==
- Alberto Vaccarezza
- Aurora Venturini
- Paulina Vinderman (born 1944)

== W ==
- J. Rodolfo Wilcock (1919–1978)

== See also ==
- Argentine literature
- List of Argentine writers
