= Cecilia Pavón =

Argentine author (born 1973)

- Born: January 9, 1973 (age 53); Mendoza, Argentina
- Education: B.A. in Literature, University of Buenos Aires
- Occupations: writer, poet, translator
- Years active: 1998–present

Cecilia Pavón (born January 9, 1973, in Mendoza, Argentina) is an Argentine writer, poet, and translator who co-founded Belleza y Felicidad. Her works have been translated to English, Portuguese, and French.

== Biography ==
Cecilia Pavón was born in Mendoza, Argentina, on January 9, 1973. At age 18, she moved to Buenos Aires to study literature at the University of Buenos Aires, where she remained after graduating.

Through Arturo Carrera, Pavón met fellow Argentine artist and author Fernanda Laguna. In 1999 Pavón and Laguna cofounded Belleza y Felicidad, a hybrid cultural center, art gallery, small publishing press, and gift shop, in the Almagro neighborhood of Buenos Aires. Critics have identified Belleza y Felicidad as a successor to the University of Buenos Aires's Centro Cultural Rojas, which from 1989 to 1996 served as a platform for young artists noted for their "seemingly anti-intellectual and apolitical aesthetics" and embrace of kitsch art. Belleza y Felicidad served as a platform for the diffusion of emerging contemporary artists and writers alongside more established figures, including César Aira, Roberto Jacoby, Dani Umpi, Rosario Bléfari, and Laguna and Pavón themselves. Inspired by the cordel literature of Brazil and the riot grrrl zine culture of the Pacific Northwest, Belleza y Felicidad's chapbooks and fanzines were generally inexpensive photocopies sold for 2 pesos. The project was notable for its promotion of women and queer authors. Pavón left Belleza y Felicidad in 2002, though she continued to collaborate with Laguna.

Since 2005, Pavón gives writing workshops. Regarding writing workshops, she has said, "I think workshops are meeting spaces where ideas are shared horizontally and better yet chaotically, something harder to achieve in an academic framework." In 2019, she founded the Microcentro Office of Poetry, a space dedicated to her writing workshops and poetry readings in downtown Buenos Aires.

In addition to her writing and art, Pavón works as a translator. She began translating during a 2004 trip to Berlin to study German at the Goethe-Institut. Her published translations from German, English, and Portuguese include works by Diedrich Diederichsen, Ariana Reines, Dorothea Lasky, Chris Kraus, Claudia Rankine, Eileen Myles, Lorrie Moore, and CAConrad.

== Published works ==
In 2001, Pavón published her first three collections of poetry: Un hotel con mi nombre ("A Hotel With My Name"), ¿Existe el amor a los animales? ("Does Love for Animals Exist?"), and Virgen ("Virgin").

In 2002, Pavón and collaborator Fernanda Laguna published the collaborative zine Ceci y Fer ("Ceci & Fer") through Belleza y Felicidad. Critic Anahí Rocío Pochettino described the book as "an experiment in collective writing and a manifesto, like the uncanny archive of Belleza y Felicidad and similar projects," and its composition as "a montage of conversations, pictures, handwritten texts, and newspaper clippings that the writers/editors emailed each other throughout the year." That same year, the famed Argentina cartonera Eloísa Cartonera published Pavón's fourth poetry collection, Pink Punk, followed in 2003 by the short story collection Discos Gato Gordo ("Fat Cat Records").

In 2004, Pavón published Caramelos de anís ("Licorice Candies"), which collected poems written in Berlin and Buenos Aires from 2002 to 2004 in the wake of the Argentine economic crisis. In 2009, Pavón published her sixth collection of poems, Poema robado a Claudio Iglesias ("A Poem Stolen from Claudio Iglesias"). In both works, critics have identified themes of economic hardship, digital friendship, and Pavón's relationship with the urban cities in which she lives.

In 2010, Pavón published the poetry collection 27 poemas con nombres de persona ("27 Poems Named After People"). That same year, she also published her first collection of short stories, Los sueños no tienen copyright ("Dreams Can't Be Copyrighted"), which critics noted for its humor, levity, and creative freedom.

In 2015, Pavón published her second short story collection, Pequeño recuento sobre mis faltas ("A Brief Survey of My Shortcomings"), in Chile. In 2017, the collection was republished in Argentina. Writing for Página 12, critic Beatriz Vignoli described the book's stories as "agile tales—satirical and autobiographical—not well-disguised as fiction [where] things at hand and the banal trigger reflections in a colloquial, desacralizing tone." In Bazar Americano, critic Flavia Garione commented on the collection's autofictional and metafictional tendencies: "What initially stands out to me is Pavón's ability to manifest in her writing an autobiographical slant deftly mixed with invention."

Pavón published her next two collection of poems Crítica de arte ("Art Criticism") and Querido libro ("Dear Book") in 2016 and 2018, respectively.

In 2020, Eterna Cadencia published Pavón's third short story collection, Todos los cuadros que tiré ("Every Painting I Ever Threw Away"), a collection of 16 stories written in the style of autofiction. Writing for Página12, Mercedes Halfon said the collection's stories "at times resemble art essays, at others a diary, or an account of the customs of the Buenos Aires arts scene, but any of these environments could be abruptly interrupted by an alien invasion or a massive flood."

In 2020, Mansalva published the poetry collection La libertad de los bares ("The Freedom of Bars").

=== Anthologies ===
In 2012, Mansalva published an anthology of several of Pavón's previous poetry collections titled Un hotel con mi nombre ("A Hotel With My Name").

In 2019, Chilean publisher Ediciones Overol published Fantasmas buenos, ("Kind Ghosts"), an anthology of Pavón's early collections ¿Existe el amor a los animales? and Crítica de arte.

=== Translations to English ===
In 2015, Sand Paper Press published Belleza y Felicidad: Selected Writings, featuring selected texts by Cecilia Pavón and Fernanda Laguna translated to English by Stuart Krimko. The same year, Scrambler Books published A Hotel With My Name, a collection of Pavón's poetry translated to English, which was selected by author Chris Kraus as a best book of 2015 for Artforum. In 2016, Scrambler Books published another volume of Pavón's selected poetry and prose titled Licorice Candies, supported by a grant from the Argentine Sur Translation Support Program.

In April 2021, Semiotext(e) published Little Joy, an anthology of 35 of Pavón's short stories originally published from 1999 to 2020, as part of its Native Agents series. In interviews, Pavón has mentioned her fixation with capitalism and consumerism as themes in the stories, a trend also noted by critics. Writing for the Los Angeles Review of Books, Kate Wolf notes, "As with Dorothea Lasky and Sheila Heti, Pavón prefers to use a bold and direct persona that is allowed to express all kinds of contradictions, a voice intoxicatingly and powerfully free."

== Style ==
Pavón is known for her poetry, short stories, and flash fiction. American writer Chris Kraus described Pavón as "a close cousin of Dorothea Lasky's" and her poems as "at once subtle, direct, and uncanny." Much of Pavón's work is written in the style of autofiction. She is seen as a central figure in the Argentine "Generation of the '90s" group of poets, known for their colloquial language, apathetic tone, blend of high and low culture, and anti-lyric narrative style. Argentine poet and critic Marina Yuszcuk has described Pavón as "a kind of minimalist and less nerdy César Aira...but to his vocation for fantasy and pure creativity she adds a sensitive perception of daily life in its smallest aspects, which comes to her strictly from her poetic background."

Pavón has cited the influences of Silvina Ocampo, Marosa Di Giordio, Arturo Carrera, Néstor Perlongher, Raymond Carver, César Aira, and Alejandra Pizarnik on her work. She has also cited several of her peers, including Marina Mariasch, Fernanda Laguna, and Gabriela Bejerman, whom she met in university, as well as Chris Kraus and Dorothea Lasky, American authors Pavón has translated to Spanish.

== Bibliography ==
- Un hotel con mi nombre, 2001 (Ediciones Deldiego) ISBN 987-1059-09-4
- ¿Existe el amor a los animales? 2001 (Editorial Siesta) ISBN 987-9348-23-0
- Virgen, 2001 (Belleza y Felicidad) ISBN 987-20137-2-1
- Pink Punk, 2002 (Eloísa Cartonera)
- Discos Gato Gordo, 2003 (Eloísa Cartonera)
- Caramelos de anís, 2004 (Belleza y Felicidad) ISBN 987-43-8338-0
- Poema robado a Claudio Iglesias, 2009 (Ediciones Vox)
- 27 poemas con nombres de persona, 2010 (Triana Editorial) ISBN 978-987-25592-0-5
- Los sueños no tienen copyright, 2010 (Blatt & Ríos) ISBN 978-987-25-898-1-3
- Un hotel con mi nombre, 2012 (Mansalva) ISBN 978-987-147-467-7
- Once Sur, 2013 (Blatt & Ríos) ISBN 978-987-29727-0-7; 2018 (Mansalva) ISBN 978-987-372-859-4
- Pequeño recuento sobre mis faltas, 2015 (Ediciones Overol) ISBN 978-956-966-702-2; 2017 (Iván Rosado) ISBN 978-987-370-834-3
- A Hotel With My Name: Collected Poems—Book 1, 2015 (Scrambler Books) ISBN 978-0-578-15686-6
- Belleza y Felicidad: Selected Writings, 2015 (Sand Paper Press) ISBN 978-0-984-33126-0
- Licorice Candies: Collected Short Stories & Poems—Book 2, 2016 (Scrambler Books) ISBN 978-0-578-17345-0
- La crítica de arte, 2016 (Juan Malasuerte)
- Querido libro, 2018 (Ediciones Neutrinos) ISBN 978-987-443-006-9
- Fantasmas buenos, 2019 (Ediciones Overol) ISBN 978-956-9667-36-7
- Todos los cuadros que tiré, 2020 (Eterna Cadencia) ISBN 978-987-712-186-5
- La libertad de los bares, 2020 (Mansalva) ISBN 978-987-8337-10-4
- Little Joy: Selected Stories, 2021 (Semiotext(e)) ISBN 978-1635901405
