= Mario Romero =

Mario Romero may refer to:

- Mario Romero (poet) (1943–1998), Argentine poet, playwright and translator
- Mario Romero (Nicaraguan boxer), Nicaraguan Olympic boxer
- Mario Romero (Venezuelan boxer), Venezuelan Olympic boxer
- Mario Romero (footballer) (born 1980), Argentine football striker
- Mario Luna Romero, tribal secretary of the Yaqui tribe of Vicam, Sonora
