= Nemer =

Nemer is a name, used by these notable people:

== Surname ==
- Ivan Nemer (born 1998), Argentine rugby union player
- Jerry Nemer (1912–1980), American basketball player
- Mona Nemer (born 1957), Lebanese-Canadian scientist

== Given name ==
- Nemer ibn el Barud (1925–2010), Argentine poet
- Nemer Saadé (born 1976), Lebanese fashion designer
