= Cartonera =

Social, political and artistic movement originating in Argentina around 2003

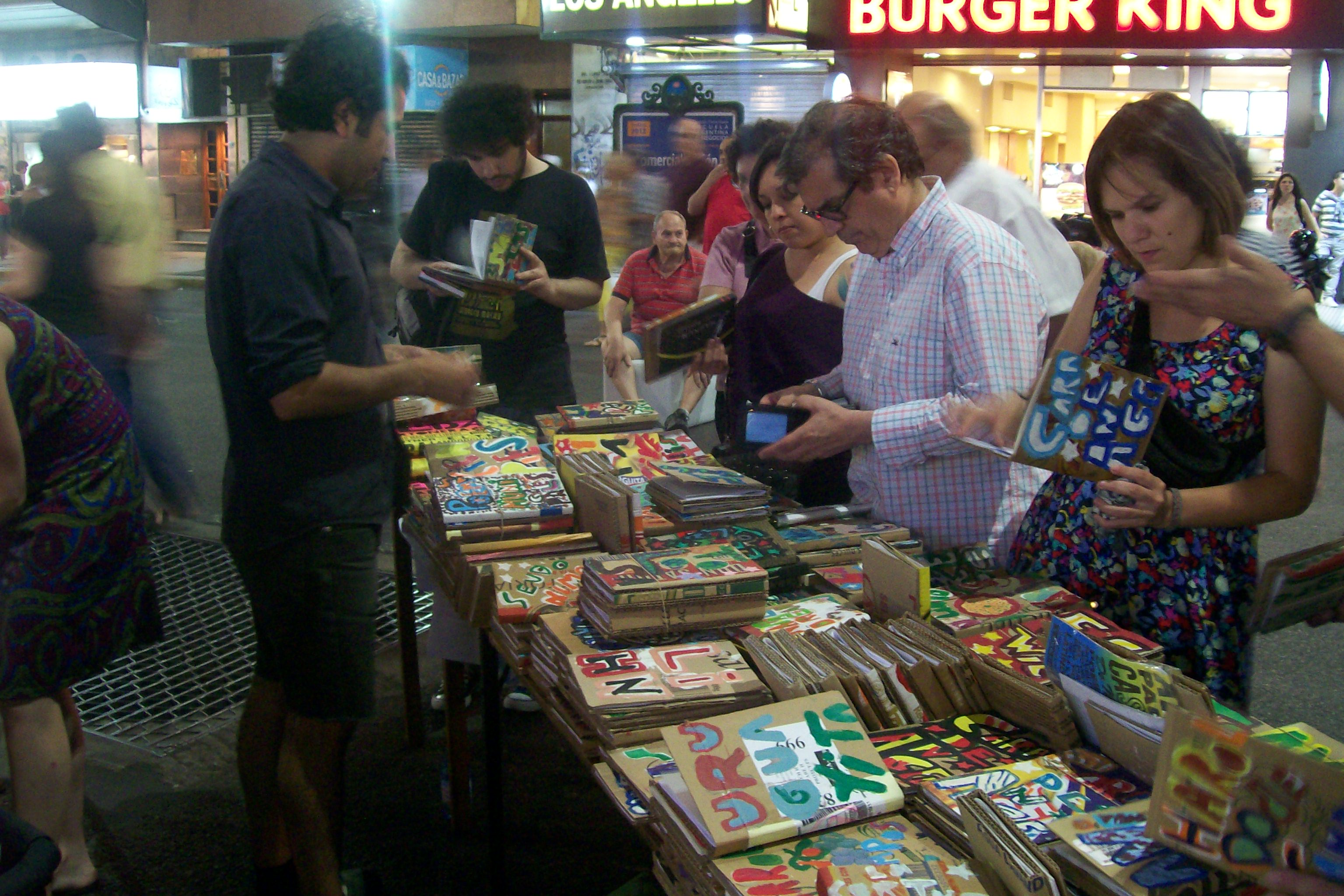
Browsing through cartonera books created by Eloísa Cartonera

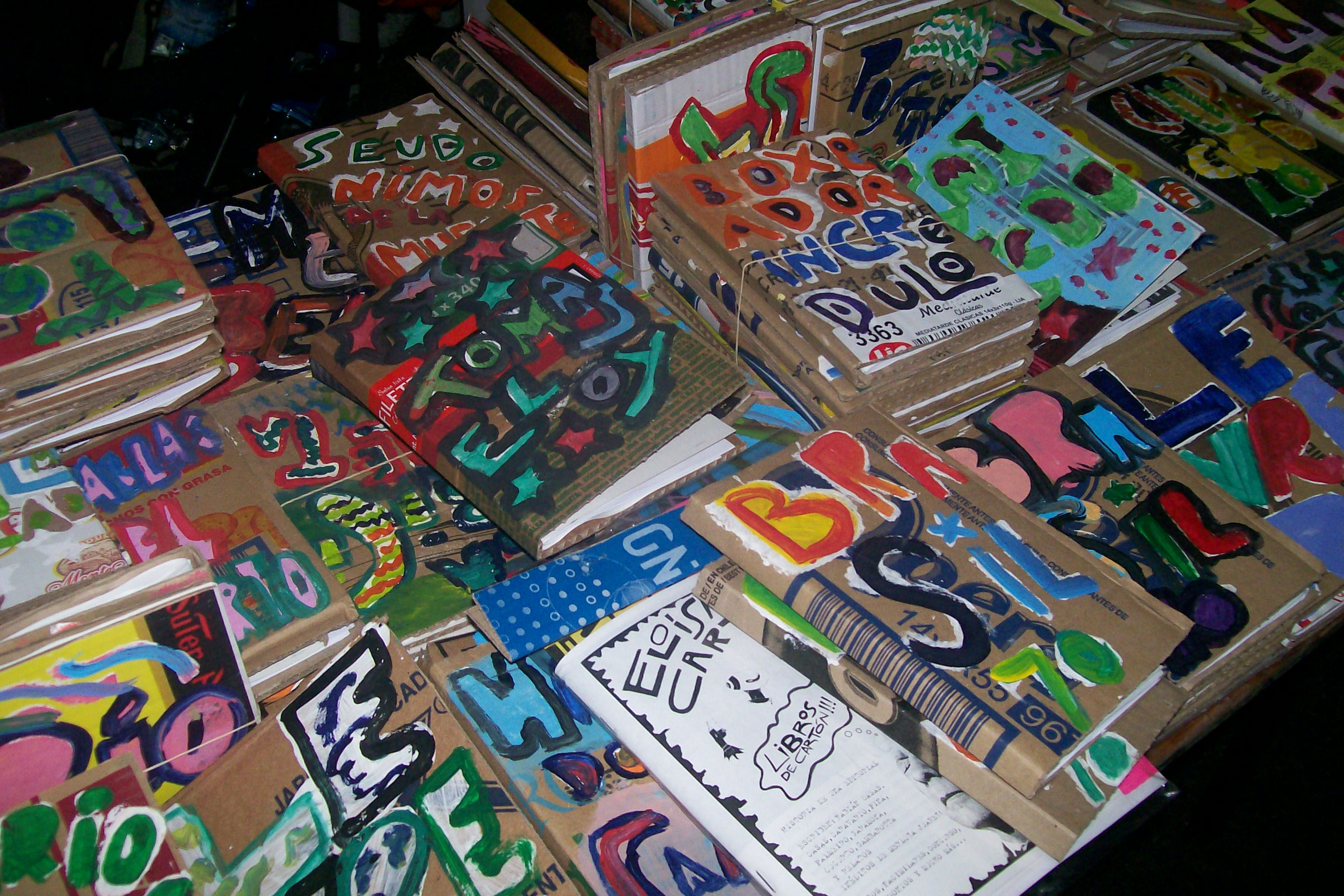
Cartonera books from Eloísa Cartonera

Cartonera is a social, political and artistic publishing movement that began in Argentina in 2003 and has since spread to countries throughout Latin America and, more recently, to Europe and Africa. The founders, Washington Cucurto, Javier Barilaro and Fernanda Laguna started Eloísa Cartonera in Buenos Aires in response to the 2001 economic crisis in which the Argentine peso plummeted to one third of its value. The difficult economic situation led to an increase in the number of cartoneros, people who make their living collecting and selling salvaged materials to recycling plants.

Cartonera books are made from cardboard bought from cartoneros at three to five times more than the price set by recycling plants. The cardboard is then used to create covers for short books of prose or poetry. Each book cover is hand painted and sold on the streets at the cost of production in order to increase access to literature. This method of publication has provided the opportunity for unknown authors to be published and for renowned authors to reach a more diverse audience. Beyond selling affordable books, the Cartoneras promote literacy and democratization of literature throughout workshops and book fairs. The Cartonera publishers also involve the community in the process of book creation and distribution through a cooperative learning experience, putting aside educational and socioeconomic divides among participants. The books are generally published in small amounts of 100 or fewer; however, popular texts are kept in print or printed through neighbouring Cartoneras.

Although the Cartoneras publish books in print form, information about the publishing houses is often available electronically through their webpages, blogs and wikis, or through online newspaper stories, interviews and journal articles. While digital media are often used to write about Cartonera, the books themselves are art-objects steeped in the smells and smudges of tempera paint and rough scissor-cut edges. Some Cartonera books are now being preserved, most notably through the University of Wisconsin-Madison's Cartonera Publishers library collection and database, but the majority of the editions continue to circulate (as they are intended to do) and will disintegrate within ten years due to acid in the cardboard. As with other digitized databases and guides, the list below includes some of the presently known Cartoneras, a number that is constantly changing.

== List of Cartoneras by country ==
=== Argentina ===
- Barcoborracho Ediciones
- Cartonerita Solara
- Cieneguita Cartonera
- Eloísa Cartonera was founded in 2003 by a group of artists and writers. The founding cartonera in the movement, Eloísa, continues to be the leading publisher of Cartonera books with a catalog of over 100 editions. From their inception, Eloísa has been a collective working with cartoneros, artists and community members to make books and grow vegetables in Buenos Aires. Everyone who works for Eloísa is paid for their work and contributions in the book-making process. In 2012, Eloísa was awarded the Premio Principal Príncipe Claus which recognizes individuals or organizations that have positively influenced society through cultural action.
- La Sofia Cartonera
- Ñasaindy Cartonera
- Textos de Carton
- Vera Cartonera

=== Bolivia ===
- Madragora Cartonera was established by Aruzamen, a professor of Literature and Philosophy at the Universidad Católica de Cochabamba. Mandrágora Cartonera is a non-profit social and cultural project that fights against the dehumanization of neo-liberalism, though not from a Marxist or Socialist perspective. They publish Bolivian and Latin American literature with an emphasis on a principle of making literature available to all people.
- Yerba Mala Cartonera was founded in 2006 by Darío Luna, Crispín Portugal and Roberto Caceres. The Cartonera is named Yerba Mala, or weeds, to show their persistence in disseminating innovative and overlooked Bolivian literature while attempting to eliminate illiteracy in Bolivia.
- Nicotina Cartonera

=== Brazil ===
- Dulcineia Catadora was founded in 2007 by sculptor Lúcia Rosa. From its inception, Dulcinéia distinguished itself from other Cartoneras by its strong relationship with the Movimento Nacional dos Catadores de Materiais Recicláveis, which works closely with the cooperatives formed by catadores to protect their rights and shift the negative associations with their title “catador” and their job of sorting trash. Rosa had established a relationship with Cooperglicério, an organization that oversees forty-five recycling cooperatives, based in the Glicério neighborhood of São Paulo. Dulcinéia Catadora currently holds weekly workshops in São Paulo’s trash and recycling centres, where catadores help make books as part of the collaboration between Dulcinéia Catadora and the Cooperglicério recycling collective. The books are sold in the center of the city by Dulcineia members and involve “interventions”, where, for example, the collective dresses in cardboard box outfits covered with Cartonera books and recites poetry through megaphones.
- Katarina Katadora is a cartonera publisher founded in Florianópolis, Santa Catarina, in 2008, by literature student Evandro Rodrigues. Katerina Kartonera collaborates extensively with Yiyi Jambo Cartonera in Paraguay and, for this reason, centers its publishing on hybrid languages and indigenous literature.
- Estrela Cartonera was founded in April 2013 in Santa Maria, Rio Grande do Sul, by poets Odemir Tex Jr. and Uiliam Ferreira Boff, social scientists Julio Souto and Diego Marafiga, and many other collaborators. The first title published was Para uma nova didática do olhar, a collection of poems by Odemir Tex Jr. The books were created with a collage technique using pieces of cloth, drawings and photographs cut from magazines. Estrela Cartonera collaborates with other cartoneras from Brazil, Paraguay, and Argentina.
- Severina Catadora was founded in July 2012 in Garanhuns, Pernambuco, by writers and cartoneras from a cooperative named ASNOV and other collaborators.
- Mariposa Cartonera was founded in August 2013 in Recife, Pernambuco, by poet Welington de Melo. They published writers like Ronaldo Correia de Brito, Sidney Rocha and Marcelino Freire.
- Catapoesia was founded in late 2009 in Serra Negra, São Paulo, by Solange Barreto. Catapoesia started as part of Barreto's pedagogical work with the aim of encouraging reading and writing in local schools located in Serra Negra, São Paulo, and Diamantina, Minas Gerais. The collective has emerged from a context characterised by garimpo (small-scale informal diamond and gold mining), quilombos, environmental degradation brought on by mining companies, and the powerful writings of João Guimarães Rosa, embedded in Brazilian folklore and landscapes.
- Ganesha Cartonera was founded in 2019 by Ary Pimentel. It is based in the Morro da Babilônia, a former favela in Rio de Janeiro.

=== Chile ===
- Animita Cartonera was founded in Santiago, Chile in 2005 by Diego Portales, Ximena Ramos and Tanya Nunez. The publishing house has an artistic, cultural and social purpose and is led by a group of young people who believe art creates spaces for dialogue and exchanging experiences. A central part of their work is leading literary workshops for the public to promote reading and increase literacy. Animita currently publishes books as part of a series. The first series involves contemporary and experimental writing, including many mixed-media works. The second series is dedicated to re-circulating unjustly forgotten authors from the past while the third is a collection of children's books.
- Canita Cartonera
- Cartonera Helecho
- Cizarra Cartonera
- INFR∀CCIÓN ediciones
- Kiltra Cartonera
- Olga Cartonera
- Nuestra Señora Cartonera

=== Colombia ===
- Amapola Cartonera

=== Dominican Republic ===
- Luzazul Cartonera

=== Ecuador ===
- Camareta Cartonera
- Editorial Cartonera Intercultural (Intercultural Cardboard * Press)
- Matapalo Cartonera was founded in 2009 in Riobamba, Ecuador. The books are made from locally collected cardboard and are constructed by young people from the community as a means of economic survival. Matapalo holds workshops in design and various art techniques.
- Matrioska Cartonera

=== El Salvador ===
- LaCabuda Cartonera

=== Finland ===
- Karu Kartonera was founded in 2012 by Peruvian poet Roxana Crisólogo and Johanna Suhonen. In 2014 Mexican poet and designer Daniel Malpica became a part of the team taking charge of the design and edition of the book Sivuvalo: Is this Finnish Literature?.

=== France ===
- Travesías - La Casa de cartón (Rennes et Relecq Kerhuon)
- Kartocéros Éditions (Clermont Ferrand)
- La Marge (Angers)
- Babel Cartonnière (Bagnère de Luchon)
- Julieta Cartonera (Toulouse)
- La Guêpe Cartonnière (Paris)
- Yvonne Cartonera (Paris)

=== Germany ===
- PapperLaPapp

=== Guatemala ===
- Cartonera Maximon

=== Mexico ===
- 2.0.1.2 Editorial
- Bakcheia Cartonera
- La Cabuda Cartonera
- La Cartonera was founded in 2008 in Cuernavaca, México, by Raúl Silva, Valeria López, Dany Hurpin, Alicia Reardon, Rocato, Nayeli Sánchez and José Antonio Suárez. The logo for La Cartonera displays a man sitting in the street dedicated to reading. He is a symbol of the work of all of the Cartoneros. La Cartonera serves as an institution that brings together writers, artists, authors and cartoneros. Editor Raúl Silva explains in La Cartonera’s blog that “we live within an enormous machine that never stops. The vertigo of the massive and the successful is an illness that seems to be incurable. It is important to think of and to know that at the margin of these enormous, monstrous publishing houses there exist small gestures that just want to construct castles in the air”.
- La Cartonera Cuernavaca
- Cartonera la Cecilia
- Casamanita Cartonera
- Cohuina Cartonera
- Kodama Cartonera
- La Cleta Cartonera ("The Bike") was founded in Cholula, Puebla, by then-students of the Universidad de las Américas Puebla in 2011. It has since published works by local authors like Gabriel Wolfson and Daniel Carpinteyro, as well as the experimental poetry book 5 Meters of Poems by Peruvian author Carlos Oquendo. As the books published are marked free of copyright, photocopying, distribution and the making of derivative works is explicitly encouraged, a collection of published works in digital form can be found online.
- Mama Dolores Cartonera
- Plastica Cartonera
- La Ratona Cartonera
- Regia Cartonera
- La Rueda Cartonera was founded by Sergio Fong, Lorena Baker and Fernando Zaragoza in 2009 in Guadalajara. In 2008, Sergio discovered cartonera when he was trying to secure a copy of Mario Santiago Papasquiaro's Respiración del Laberinto and found that it was being brought out in a cartonera co-edition. The following year, La Rueda Cartonera was born and has survived several changes of location and editorial team creating a catalogue of over 50 publications.
- Santa Muerte Cartonera
- La Verdura Cartonera

=== Mozambique ===
- Kutsemba Cartão

=== Paraguay ===
- Yiyi Jambo Cartonera (Paraguay) was co-founded in 2007 by poet Douglas Diegues and painter Amarildo García with the support of Argentine artist Javier Barilaro. Their work focuses on redefining the concept of globalization within literature and art, and publishing marginalized and culturally oppressed writers and artists. They are breaking down language barriers, national borders and social repression with vanguard, youthful and iconoclastic images and texts. Yiyi Jambo has published books in Spanish, Guaraní, Portuguese and the hybrid language Portunhol Selvagem.
- Felicita Cartonera
- Mamacha Cartonera
- Mburukujarami Kartonera

=== Peru ===
- Sarita Cartonera is a cultural agent in Lima. Sarita was founded in 2004 by Tania Silva, Milagros Saldarriaga and Jaime Vargas Luna. After purchasing cardboard from cartoneros, a group of young people from poor neighbourhood in Lima hand manufactured, assembled, painted and designed the books. Sarita Cartonera has also developed a literacy program called Libros, Un Modelo Para Armar (LUMPA), where new readers are introduced to literary criticism and directly engage with the production of literature. LUMPA's pedagogical model is currently used by a literacy program at Harvard University that is implemented in the Boston Public Schools. Sarita's catalog includes avant-garde Peruvian writers and their titles are distributed in bookstores, on college campuses and at international book fairs.
- Eqquss Editorial Cartonera
- My Lourdes Cartonera
- Viringo Cartonero

=== Puerto Rico ===
- Atarraya Cartonera
- Mambrú Editorial Cartonera
- Coqui Cartonero https://www.facebook.com/profile.php?id=100010040351112
- Editorial Rincon Cartonero & Digital https://www.facebook.com/EditorialRinconCartonero
- https://www.facebook.com/CoquiCartoneroEditorial/

=== Spain ===
- Astromántica Cartoneira
- Casamanita Cartoneira
- Cartonerita Ninabonita
- Cartopies Cartonera
- Ediciones Karakarton
- Llibres de Cartró
- Meninas Cartoneras
- Ultramarina Cartonera & Digital

=== United States ===
- TACOCAT Cartonera
- Cartonera Santanera was founded in December 2012 in Santa Ana, California, by Isidro Perez Garcia and Adriana Lilus. Cartonera Santanera have long worked in Santa Ana and Los Angeles with a particular textual focus on indigenous languages and an artistic focus on artisanal cochineal dyes. In December 2016, they took part in the Hammer Museum's 'Recycled Languages: Workshop and Reading', a cross-language event that included a poetry reading featuring work written in languages other than English with and without translations, with Kaya Press (Los Angeles), Kodama Cartonera (Tijuana), and Tiny Splendor (Los Angeles).

=== Uruguay ===
- La Propia Cartonera

=== Venezuela ===
- HarKâlÿa Kartonera
