= Latin American poetry =

Poetry written by Latin America authors

Latin American poetry is the poetry written by Latin American authors. Latin American poetry is often written in Spanish, but is also composed in Portuguese, Mapuche, Nahuatl, Quechua, Mazatec, Zapotec, Ladino, English, and Spanglish. The unification of Indigenous and imperial cultures produced a unique and extraordinary body of literature in this region. Later with the introduction of African slaves to the new world, African traditions greatly influenced Latin American poetry. Many great works of poetry were written in the colonial and pre-colonial time periods, but it was in the 1960s that the world began to notice the poetry of Latin America. Through the modernismo movement, and the international success of Latin American authors, poetry from this region became increasingly influential.

== Pre-Columbian poetry ==
There are multiple examples of Aztec poetry written in Nahuatl. Most of these were collected during the early period of the colonization of Mexico by Spanish clergy who involved themselves in an effort to collect firsthand knowledge of all things related to the indigenous civilizations of the newly conquered territory. One of these Spanish clergy, fray Bernardino de Sahagún, enlisted the help of young Aztecs to interview and record stories, histories, poems and other information from older Aztecs who still remembered the pre-conquered times. Much of the information that was collected by these colonial anthropologists has been lost, but researchers found originals or copies of the original research in libraries around the world.

== Colonial era ==
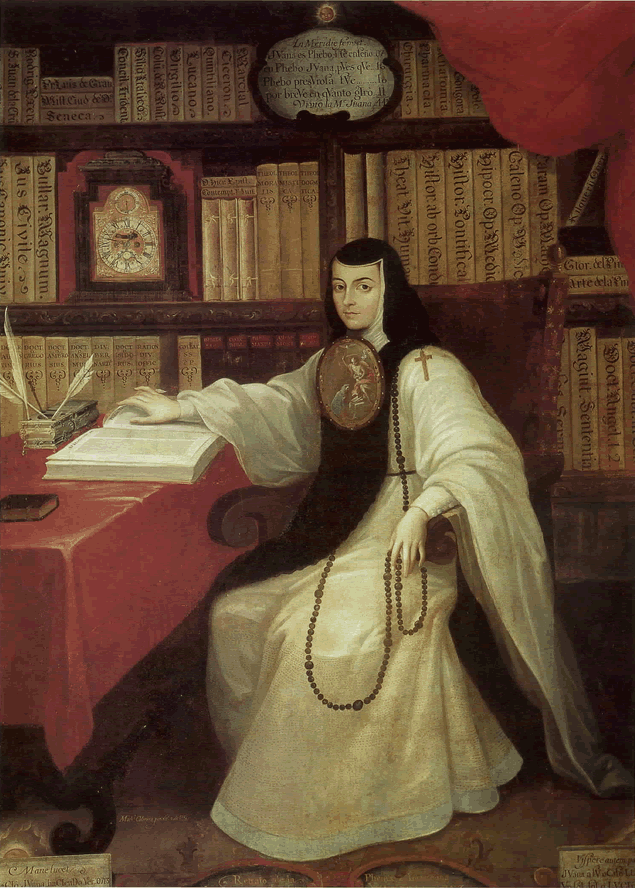
Sor Juana Inés de la Cruz by Miguel Cabrera

During the period of conquest and colonization many Hispanic Americans were educated in Spain. The poets of this historical period followed the European trends in literature, including the style of romantic ballads as well as satire. The first Spanish American poets to gain recognition for their work were Spanish settlers with great influence in the New World, including Alonso de Ercilla y Zúñiga (1533–94). He wrote widely renowned poetry praising Spanish conquests.

The first known colonial poet born in the Americas was Dominican nun Leonor de Ovando, born in Santo Domingo in 1544, whose poetic works revolved around religious devotion and love for the divine.

Another great figure in colonial era poetry is the Mexican nun Sor Juana Ines de la Cruz, who wrote many notable works of poetry, prose, and theater in Spanish and other native languages. In her work, she took many feminist standpoints and echoed the beliefs of the Enlightenment ideals emerging in Europe. Consecutively, the Counter-Reformation challenged Sor Juana's work and any poetry or literature seem as promoting concepts of liberty and freedom. After the 1802 Haitian Revolution, circulation of liberal ideas was halted by colonizers. The struggle for independence of the Spanish Colonies saw a literature of defiance of authority and a sense of social injustice that is ever present in Spanish American poetics.

== 19th century ==
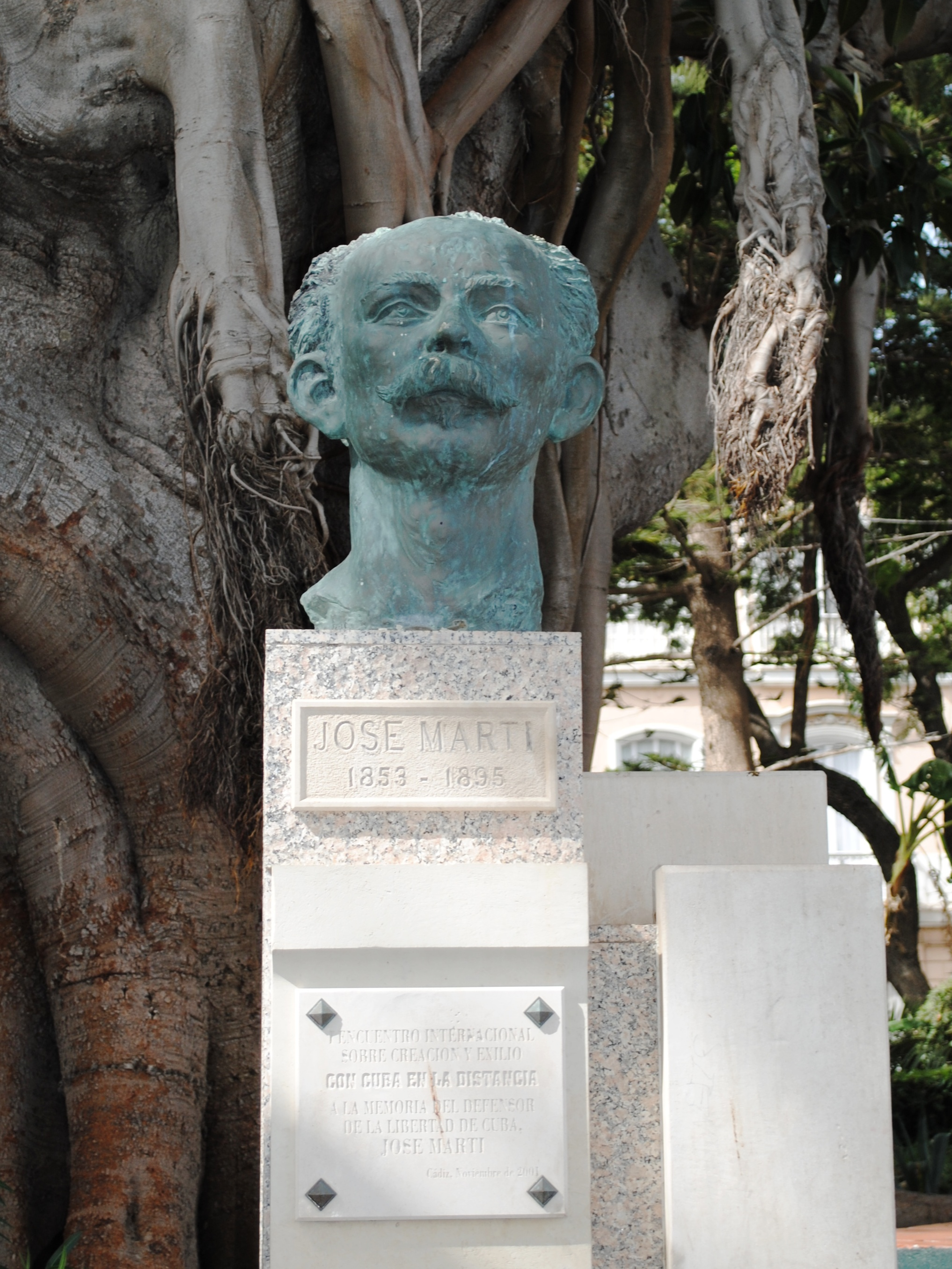
Monument of Martí in Cádiz, Spain

Poetry of the 18th and 19th centuries saw a shift away from the long-winded ballads of the past, and toward more modern and short forms. The poetry of the 19th century continued with trends of liberty and revolution. Works about the influential fighters and leaders were distributed throughout the newly liberated countries of Latin America, as well as a celebrated new focus on the wonders of American land and its indigenous people. José Martí is an example of a poet-martyr who literally died fighting for the freedom of Cuba. His most famous poem, Yo soy un hombre sincero has entered into popular culture as it has been reproduced hundreds of times into the song "Guantanamera", most recently by Celia Cruz and even the Fugees. Later in the 19th century, the poetry of Latin America continued to shift away from European styles. A distinctive Spanish-American tradition began to emerge with the creation of Modernismo (not to be confused with Modernism).

=== Modernism ===
Modernismo: a literary movement that arose in Spanish America in the late 19th century and was subsequently transmitted to Spain. Introduced by Rubén Darío with the publication of "Azul" (1888), it is commonly accepted that it concluded with Darío's death in 1916. This new style of poetry was strongly influenced by the French symbolist and Parnassians. In rebellion against romanticism, the modernists attempted to renew poetic language and to create a poetry characterized by formal perfection, musicality, and strongly evocative imagery. Cesar Vallejo's Trilce, published in 1922, was at the forefront of the avant-garde movement that would develop in the 1920s and 1930s. Vallejo's poetry stretched syntax, invented words, and deployed automatic writing and other techniques now known as "surrealist". Many poets embrace scenery and love of their land in their new works, including Gutiérrez Nájera and Juana Borrero. Uruguayan Delmira Agustini was a feminist poet of the time period known for being sexually explicit in her literature and paving the way for future feminist authors of Latin American such as Alfonsina Storni and Nobel laureate Gabriela Mistral.

== 20th century ==
After gaining popularity in non-Latin cultures due to the wide reach of modernismo, Latin American poetry continued to develop in the 20th century. Toward the end of the millennium, consideration of Spanish-American poetry took a multi-cultural approach. Scholars began to emphasize poetry by women, Afro/a-Hispanics, contemporary indigenous communities, and other sub-cultural groupings. Nicolás Guillén (Cuba) and Luis Palés Matos (Puerto Rico) incorporate the African roots in the rhythm of their poetry, in their "Afro-Antillano" verses. The influence of African heritage is acknowledged and celebrated in 20th-century Latin American literature. Afro-Caribbean trends reappear in the poetry of Puerto Rican and Nuyorican poets such as Pedro Pietri, Miguel Algarín, and Giannina Braschi who continue the tradition of poetry as performance art, but with a clear anti-imperialist political thrust. Braschi's Empire of Dreams (1988) is a postmodern poetry epic about immigrant life in New York City; the work is a pastiche, riffing on Spanish Golden Age pastoral eclogues and Latin American modernist poems.

After World War I, following Modernismo and influences from Cubism, Futurism, Dadaism, Ultraism, and surrealism, the avant-garde was adopted by Latin American poets. Vanguardista was seen as a self-reflective art form that threw away constraints of beauty as a common theme. Many Nobel Prize winners, including Gabriela Mistral, Pablo Neruda, and Octavio Paz, used surrealism in their work and were recognized for it. Pablo Neruda, who was described by Gabriel García Márquez as "the greatest poet of the twentieth century in any language". Neruda's epic poem Canto General gained worldwide recognition as his "greatest work", and it the lyric voice gives a sweeping description of Latin America from pre-history to the 20th century. Neruda's epic flows in a blank verse and piles metaphors upon metaphors with a lyrical style that favors excess.

=== Prose poetry ===
There is a strong tradition of prose poetry in Latin America in the 20th century. Though there are examples of prose poems dating back to appearances in the Bible, the advent of prose poetry as a literary genre first surges in Europe with the modernist poets and symbolists of the 19th century, such as Charles Baudelaire ("Be Drunk"), Rainer Maria Rilke, Franz Kafka, Paul Verlaine, Arthur Rimbaud, and Stéphane Mallarmé. It is in the 20th century that Latin American poets resurrect the prose poem as a platform for philosophical inquiry and sensual sentiments; masters of the prose poem include Jorge Luis Borges ("Everything and Nothing"), Pablo Neruda (Passions and Impressions), Octavio Paz (Aguila o Sol?/Eagle or Sun?), Alejandra Pizarnik ("Sex/Night"), Giannina Braschi (Empire of Dreams), and Clarice Lispector (Água Viva).

== Latin American women poets ==
Latin American women have been a force of innovation in poetry in Spanish since the sonnets and romances by Sor Juana Inés de la Cruz in the 17th century. Sor Juana's poems spanned a range of forms and themes of the Spanish Golden Age, and her writings display inventiveness, wit, and a vast range of secular and theological knowledge. The first Latin American poet to receive the Nobel Prize in Literature is Gabriela Mistral. Mistral's lyrics used a regular meter and rhyme to describe impassioned female subjects, such as the abandoned, the jealous lover, the mother in fear for her vulnerable child, and the teacher who lifts her students with a love for knowledge and compassion. Though revered by Octavio Paz and Roberto Bolano, Alejandra Pizarnik's prose poetry is not well known outside of her native Argentina. With themes of solitude, childhood, madness, and death, Pizarnik explored the borders between speech and silence. She was heavily influenced by French modernism and drawn to "the suffering of Baudelaire, the suicide of Nerval, the premature silence of Rimbaud, the mysteries of Lautréamont," and "unparalleled intensity" of Artaud's suffering." Delmira Agustini's poems focused on themes of female sexuality, love and fantasy, often featuring characters from Greek antiquity including Eros, the Greek God of love. Her work entitled Empty Chalices (1913) solidifies her a place in La Vanguardia, alongside Norah Lange (The Street in the Evening). Julia de Burgos's poetry weaved romance and political activism for women and African/Afro-Caribbean writers, and is considered a precursor to contemporary U.S. Latina/o and Latinx literature. Giannina Braschi is one of the rare female poets in Latin America to write epic poetry; her cross-genre epics tackle geopolitical subjects such as debt crisis, national building, decolonization, and revolution. In the genre of children's poetry, Afro-Cuban poet Excilia Saldaña's works such as "Noche" (Night) relies of female figures of the grandmother to transmit wisdom to children; her experimental writing contained elements of Afro-Latino mythology and folklore. Saldaña also wrote of domestic violence, motherhood, feeling anonymous, and the power of female friendships.

== Latin American poets (by historical period) ==
Pre-Columbian

- Nezahualcoyotl, Aztec

Colonial period

- Juana Inés de la Cruz
- Alonso de Ercilla
- Luis de Góngora

19th century

- Andrés Bello
- José Martí
- Rubén Darío
- Delmira Agustini
- Alfonsina Storni
- Gabriela Mistral
- José María Heredia
- Gertrudis Gómez de Avellaneda
- José Joaquín de Olmedo
- Esteban Echeverría
- Manuel Gutiérrez Nájera

20th century

- Jorge Luis Borges
- Roberto Bolaño
- Giannina Braschi
- Ernesto Cardenal
- Julia de Burgos
- Carlos Drummond de Andrade
- Karina Galvez
- Juan Gelman
- Nicolás Guillén
- Jorge Enrique González Pacheco
- Vicente Huidobro
- Lezama Lima
- Vinicius de Moraes
- Gabriela Mistral
- Pablo Neruda
- Nicanor Parra
- Benito Pastoriza Iyodo
- Alfonsina Storni
- Mario Santiago Papasquiaro
- César Vallejo
- Raúl Zurita
- Andrés Morales
- Emeterio Cerro
- Eugenio Cruz Vargas
- Octavio Paz
- Aleyda Quevedo

== See also ==
- Latin American literature
- Latino poetry
- Chicano poetry
- Nuyorican
- Caribbean poetry
- Décima
