= Vicenta =

Vicenta is a given name. Notable people with the name include:

- Vicenta Arenas Mayor (born 1975), Spanish goalball player
- Vicenta Castro Cambón (1882–1928), Argentinian poet
- Vicenta Chávez Orozco (1867–1949), Mexican nun
- Vicenta García Miranda (1816–1877), Spanish poet
- Vicenta González (born 1948 or 1949), Nicaraguan humanitarian
- Vicenta Jerónimo (born 1972), Guatemalan indigenous human rights defender and politician
- Vicenta Juaristi Eguino (1780–1857), Bolivian heroine
- Vicenta María López i Vicuña (1847–1890), Spanish nun
- Vicenta Ndongo (born 1968), Spanish actress
- Vicenta Salmón (born 1954), Cuban basketball player

== See also ==
- Tía Vicenta, Argentine magazine
