= 3 Novels by César Aira =

- Author: César Aira
- Publisher: Penguin Books
- Publication date: 2015
- Pages: 336

3 Novels by César Aira is a collection of works by Argentine writer César Aira. It contains the novellas Ghosts, An Episode in the Life of a Landscape Painter and The Literary Conference. It was first published by Penguin Books in 2015, and rereleased by Penguin Essentials in 2018. The work was described by The Guardian as "dizzying avant-garde writing".
