= Anahí Lazzaroni =

Argentine poet

- Born: Anahí Mónica Lazzaroni; August 30, 1957; La Plata, Argentina
- Died: March 26, 2019 (aged 61); Ushuaia, Argentine
- Occupations: Poet and writer

Anahí Mónica Lazzaroni (La Plata, August 30, 1957 – Ushuaia, March 27, 2019) was an Argentine poet.

== Personal life ==
Anahí Lazzaroni was born in La Plata, Buenos Aires Province, Argentina in 1957. In 1966, she and her family moved to Ushuaia, Tierra del Fuego, where she lived and worked all her life. Her mother was a teacher and her father was a lawyer. Her sister, Alicia Lazzaroni, is a writer and journalist who is also involved in Ushuaian cultural art, having written a play based on historical letters from the Ushuaia Prison.

Lazzaroni had achondroplasia, and in the last twenty years of her life suffered from chronic bone pain. Lazzaroni was close to poets Carlos Juárez Aldazábal and Florencia Lobo, and the poet Francisco Squeo Acuña, to whom she dedicated her poem Diciembre 1990.

Lazzaroni died on March 27, 2019.

== Career ==
When she was 19 years old, Lazzaroni took part in a workshop with Ana Emilia Lahitte on Contemporary Argentine Poetry, and has said that this experience connected her with Argentine poetry, with one of her favorite poets being Alejandra Pizarnik.

Lazzaroni began publishing her poetry when she was 20, starting with Viernes de acrílico (1977). From 1986 to 1994 she co-founded and directed the magazine Aldea, which published on a variety of topics related to the history of Tierra del Fuego and Ushuaia, including literary topics and anthropology, sociology, and geography. Her poems are considered to be among the work of artists in the Patagonia Argentina region.

Throughout her career, Lazzaroni collaborated with newspapers and publications all over Argentina, internationally, and online. Her poems have been translated into Italian, Portuguese, English, French, Korean and Catalan.

Lazzaroni was inspired by Japanese poetry, especially haikus, as well as Fuegian philosophy. In her poetry, she wrote about her neighborhood in Ushuaia, social issues, Ushuaian history, the natural world, and her experience with pain.

=== Anahí Lazzaroni Popular Library ===
A library in the Bahía Golondrina ("Monte Galliner") neighborhood of Ushuaia, Argentina was named after Lazzaroni after she died. The Anahí Lazzaroni Popular Library ("Biblioteca Popular Anahí Lazzaroni" in Spanish) is run by the Ushuaia anda Leyendo Civil Association.

== Works ==
=== Poetry ===
- Viernes de acrílico (1977)
- Liberen a la libélula (1980)
- En esta ciudad se escribirá una novela (texto experimental en prosa) (Aldea Magazine Editions, 1988)
- Dibujos (Aldea Magazine, 1988)
- El poema se va sin saludarnos (Ediciones Último Reino, 1994)
- Bonus Track (Ediciones Último Reino, 1994; Último Reino, 1999),
- A la luz del desierto (Y acechar el haiku) (Ediciones Último Reino, 2004),
- El viento sopla (El Suri Perfiado, 2011)
- Alguien lo dijo (El Suri Perfiado, 2017).

=== Anthologies ===
- Antología del empedrado, 1996.
- Poesía Argentina año 2000, selection and prologue by Marcela Croce, 1999.
- Cantando en la casa del viento – Poets of Tierra del Fuego, selection and prologue by Niní Bernardello, 2010.
- Antología Federal de poesía – Patagonia Region, 2015.
- La frontera móvil. Antología de poesía contemporánea de la Patagonia Argentina, selection and prologue by Concha García and epilogue by Luciana Mellado, Edciones Carena, Madrid, Spain.
- Poesía de la Patagonia Fueguina – Una aproximación de la obra de Anahí Lazzaroni, by María Emilia Graf, Spanish Academic Publishing House, Madrid, 2014

=== Magazines ===
- Aldea - co-founded and directed the magazine from 1986 to 1994

== See also ==
- Argentine literature
- Latin American poetry
- List of Argentine poets
