= Ana Emilia Lahitte =

Argentine writer and poet

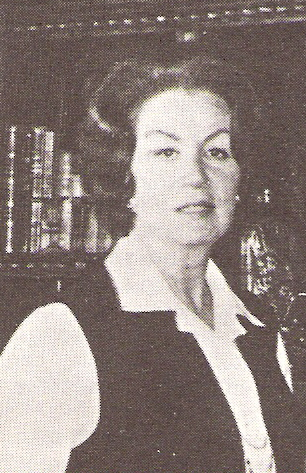
- Ana Emilia Lahitte (1981)
- Born: December 19, 1921; La Plata, Argentina
- Died: July 10, 2013 (aged 91)
- Occupations: Poet, playwright, writer
- Notable work: Amantes clandestinos

Ana Emilia Lahitte (La Plata, December 19, 1921 – July 10, 2013) was an Argentine writer, poet, and playwright. Her works include several literary genres, but mainly poetry.

== Life ==
Throughout her career, Lahitte gained international acclaim for her works.

Along with other poets like María Dhialma Tiberti, Horacio Ponce de León, María de Villarino, and Raúl Amaral, Lahitte was a part of the magazine Ediciones del Bosque (formed around 1948). This group was referred to as Generation del 40 due to the success that all the members achieved.

Lahitte was also an educator in poetry. One notable poets who studied under her was Anahí Lazzaroni.

Lahitte died on July 10, 2013.

== Works (selected) ==
Her works have been collected into numerous anthologies and been translated into English, French, German, Italian, and Portuguese.

- 1993 "El tiempo, ese desierto demasiado extendido".
- 1995 "Cinco Poetas capitales: Ballina, Castillo, Mux, Oteriño y Preler"
- 1997 "Summa (1947-1997)"
- 2003 "Insurrecciones".
- 1980 "Los abismos".
- "El cuerpo"
- "Cielos y otros tiempos".
- 1947 "Sueños sin eco".
- 1980 "Los dioses oscuros."
- 1975 "Roberto Themis Speroni" (essay and anthology)

== Awards (selected) ==
- 1980 International PEN Silver feather.
- 1982 Grand Prize of Honor and Golden Puma of Argentine Poetry Foundation.
- 1983 First National Poetry First Prize (Buenos Aires Region)
- 1994 Roberto Themis Speroni Consecration Prize
- Illustrious Citizen of the City of La Plata
- 1994 Konex Prize, merit diploma
- 1997 Literature Prize "Homero Manzi"
- 1999 Poetry Literature Prize "Esteban Echeverría".
- 2002 "Great Honour Award" and "Golden Puma" of Argentine Poetry Foundation.
- 2005 "Sol del Macla Award", MACLA.
- 2006 Named "Honorary Member" of the SEA (Society of Writers of Argentina)

== See also ==
- Lists of writers
- List of Argentine poets
- Argentine literature
- Latin American literature
