= Emeterio Cerro =

Argentine writer

- Born: Héctor Medina; December 3, 1952; Balcarce, Buenos Aires Province, Argentina
- Died: December 12, 1996 (aged 44); Buenos Aires, Argentina
- Education: Instituto Superior de Arte del Teatro Colón; Sorbonne University
- Occupations: Poet, playwright, short story writer
- Writing career
- Language: Spanish
- Notable works: La Juanetarga, Las Guaranís, Tango-Macbeth

Emeterio Cerro (pen name of Héctor Medina; December 3, 1952 – December 12, 1996) was an Argentine poet, playwright and short fiction writer.

== Biography ==
Emeterio Cerro, whose birth name is Héctor Medina, was born on December 3, 1952, in Balcarce, in the Province of Buenos Aires, Argentina. He obtained a degree in psychology and graduated as an opera regisseur from the Higher Institute of Arts of the Colón Theatre (Instituto Superior de Arte del Teatro Colón). He later attended advanced linguistics courses at the Sorbonne University in Paris. Since 1986, he lived in Paris.

In 1983, he founded the theatre company La Barrosa (Miss Murkiness), through which he staged many of his plays and experimental works. The company's name derived from one of his works consisting of two long poems structured around musical repetition and sound variation, where the logic of the discourse was primarily phonetic. Among his plays were La Juanetarga, El Cuis Cuis, El Bochicho, La Julietada, La Magdalena del Ojón, El Bollo, Doña Ñoca, La Papelona, La María Rodríguez, La Tullivieja, La Dongue, La Marita, Loca de Amor (Mad of Love), Las Guaranís (1996), and Tango-Macbeth.

He collaborated with literary magazines and newspapers including Último Reino and El Porteño from Argentina, Ovación from Colombia, Dimensão from Brasil, Empireuma and Gemma from España, Akcent from Poland and Les Cahiers du Sud in France. Cerro is associated with the Neobaroque literary movement alongside writers such as Severo Sarduy, Néstor Perlongher, Arturo Carrera, Tamara Kamenszain, and Osvaldo Lamborghini.

He died in Buenos Aires on December 12, 1996.

== Works ==
=== Novels ===
- Las Ecogógicas (1985)
- La Bulina (1989)
- El Salvatierra (1994)

=== Poetry ===
- La Barrosa (Miss Murkiness or The Muddy One, 1982)
- El Bochicho (1983)
- Las Amarantas (1984)
- El Charmelo (1986)
- Aguasmadres (1986)
- Los Fifris de Galia (1988)
- Las Mirtillas (1989)
- Los Teros del Danubio (1990)
- El Bristol (1991)
- Las Carnes (1992)
- Pasodoble Español (1992)
- L’Hambre China (1993)
- La Maruca Bustos (1993)
- Sangre Salomé (1996)

=== Playwrights ===
- Teatralones (1985)

=== Short fiction ===
- Retrato de un Albañil Adolescente (Portrait of an Adolescent Construction Worker in collaboration with Arturo Carrera, 1988)
- Telones Zurcidos para Títeres con Himen (Drop Curtains Mended for Puppets with Hymen in collaboration with Arturo Carrera, 1988)
- El Cecilio (1991)
- La Petite Bouline (1991)
- A la San Pampa (1995)
- Cuervos en Gomina (1996)
