= Ghosts (Aira novel) =

1990 novel by César Aira

- First edition
- Author: César Aira
- Translator: Chris Andrews
- Cover artist: Rodrigo Corral
- Language: Spanish
- Genre: Novel
- Publisher: Grupo Editor Latinoamericano
- Publication date: 1990
- Publication place: Argentina
- English publication date: 2009
- Media type: Print (Paperback)
- Pages: 144
- ISBN: 978-0-8112-1742-2
- OCLC: 227016273
- Dewey Decimal: 863/.64 22
- LC Class: PQ7798.1.I7 F8313 2008

Ghosts by César Aira was first published under the title Los fantasmas in 1990. Chris Andrews’s English translation was published by New Directions in 2009. It was nominated for the 2010 Best Translated Book Award shortlist.

== Summary ==
Ghosts takes place in an unfinished luxury apartment complex in Buenos Aires that is shared by the night watchman's family, who live on the roof, and a cadre of ghosts who haunt its floors. While most of the construction workers and family members react to the ghosts with detachment, the family's teenage daughter becomes increasingly attracted by the specters. As the story progresses through New Year's Eve, the daughter's interest in the ghosts becomes more complex and nefarious, and ultimately threatens her life.

== See also ==
- 3 Novels by César Aira
