= Andrés Chabrillón =

Argentine poet and writer

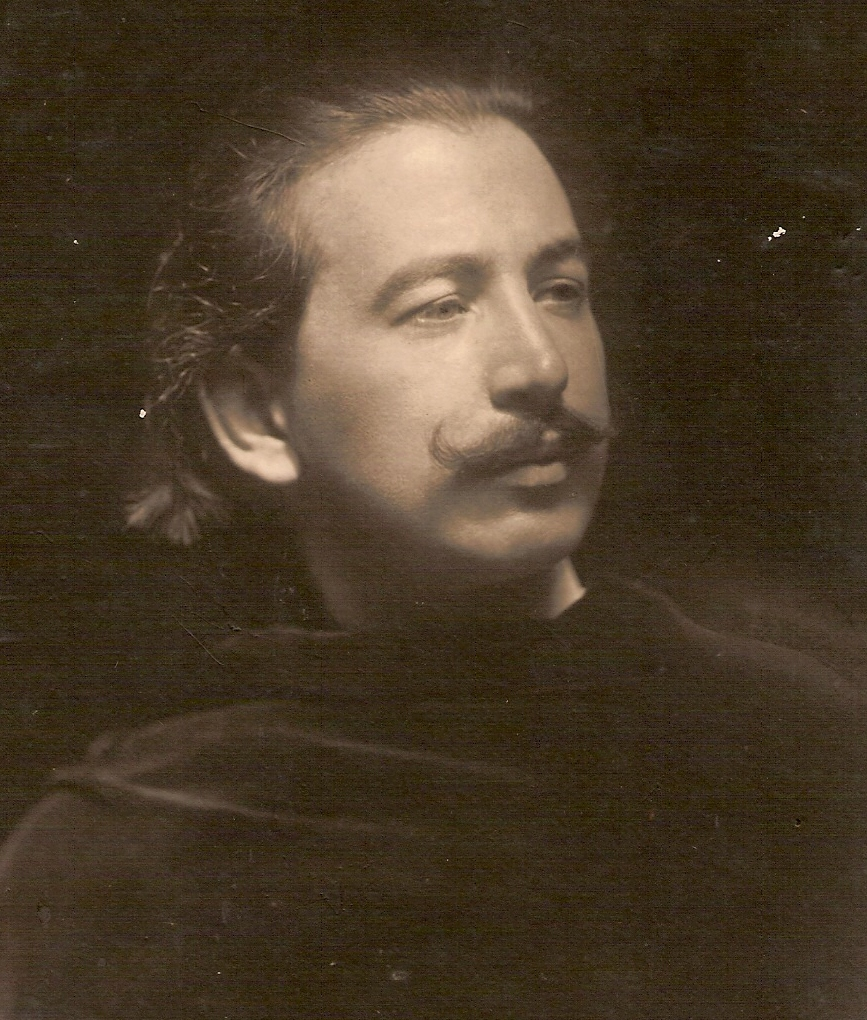
- Born: September 20, 1887; Paraná, Entre Ríos, Argentina
- Died: Buenos Aires, Argentina.
- Occupation(s): Poet, Literature Professor, Magistrate, Lawyer.
- Known for: Poet, writer

Andrés Chabrillón (anglicised as Andres Chabrillon, 20 September 1887—1968) was an Argentine poet, writer, lecturer and literature professor of French descent.

Chabrillón was born in Paraná, Entre Ríos, and later lived in Buenos Aires.

He travelled widely across Europe and the Americas. In 1911 he published his first book of poems, entitled "A la luz de una sombra" ("Under a shadow's light").

He is considered one of the advanced poets of the creationism movement that was initiated with Vicente Huidobro and Pierre Reverdy. He handled the historical, the specific, the picturesque, the artificial, and sometimes he took for himself some elements of symbolism, of the Parnaso and those of decadentism (basic components of his revolutionary formula). As Mastronardi would do in the next movement, Chabrillón pioneered the modernist "Kermesse porteña" in a very "entrerrianian" way.

He belonged to the group of bohemians who would meet at the Café de los Inmortales in Buenos Aires.

Evaristo Carriego, Ghiraldo, Álvaro Melián Lafinur, Enrique Banchs, Juan Pedro Calou, Roberto F. Giusti, Alfredo Bianchi, Juan Pablo Echagüe, Hugo de Achával, Natalio Botana, Alberto Gerchunoff, Charles de Soussens, Roberto J. Payró, Luis Doello Jurado, Edmundo Montagne, Bernardo González Arrili, Domingo Robatto, Héctor Pedro Blomberg, Federico Carlando, Juan Francisco Palerino, Fernán Félix de Amador and the viscount Emilio de Lascano Tegui were some of the poets and writers that used to share their time with Chabrillón.

He graduated as an Attorney in 1913 from the Faculty of Law, University of Buenos Aires. He practiced as a lawyer and judge in the provinces of Entre Ríos and Misiones Province.

In 1918 he moved to Concordia, Entre Ríos, where he lived until 1962. He then moved to Buenos Aires, where he spent the last few years of his life until his death in 1968.

== Published books ==
- A la luz de una sombra, Herculano, 1911.
- Oro pálido, Edit. Virtus, Buenos Aires, Argentina, 1919.
- Desnudez, Manuel Gleizer Editor, Argentina, 1931.
- Si pensara la rosa, Editorial Nueva Impresora, Argentina, 1954.
- La cigarra, Editorial Nueva Impresora, Argentina, 1955.
- Tres lágrimas de topacio, [Tall gráf. Dulau], Argentina, 1963.
- Al poeta Julio Garet Mas,[s.n.], Argentina, 1964.
- Por mitades con la muerte, Editorial de Entre Ríos, Subsecretaría de Cultura, Entre Ríos, Argentina, 1995.
