= An Episode in the Life of a Landscape Painter =

2000 novel by César Aira

- Author: César Aira
- Translator: Chris Andrews
- Cover artist: Johann Moritz Rugendas
- Language: Spanish
- Genre: Novel
- Publisher: New Directions
- Publication date: 2000
- Publication place: Argentina
- English publication date: 2006
- Media type: Print (Paperback)
- Pages: 87
- ISBN: 978-0-8112-1630-2
- OCLC: 62421254
- Dewey Decimal: 863/.64 22
- LC Class: PQ7798.1.I7 E6513 2006

An Episode in the Life of a Landscape Painter by César Aira was first published in 2000. Chris Andrews’ English translation was published by New Directions in 2006.

== Summary ==
An Episode in the Life of a Landscape Painter simultaneously navigates the territories of history, philosophy, and fantasy to offer less a biography of German painter Johann Moritz Rugendas (1802-1858) than a surreal account of his journeys through Latin America. At the prompting of explorer and naturalist Alexander von Humboldt, Rugendas travels to Argentina, Chile, and Mexico to paint their landscapes with a sense of what Humboldt calls "physiognomic totality," an understanding of each work as a portrait of the environment as a whole. In Argentina, Rugendas' adventure into the Pampas almost costs him his life when he is struck by lightning while riding his horse and then dragged through the Pampas as his horse flees. This leaves him horribly disfigured. As Rugendas struggles to recover physically he now sees the landscape with an altered vision. Aira's themes include the persistence of the artist and the sustaining power of his will to continue painting.

== Reception ==
An Episode in the Life of a Landscape Painter has been hailed as "thrilling" (The New York Sun) and "utterly astonishing" (San Francisco Chronicle), a "memorable performance...whose tone and oddly compelling vision are distinctly [Aira's] own" (Los Angeles Times). In his San Francisco Chronicle review, critic Ilan Stavans places this work alongside that of Roberto Bolaño as a modern Latin American novel likely to endure beyond its present moment.

== See also ==
- 3 Novels by César Aira
