= How I Became a Nun =

1993 novel by César Aira

- First edition
- Author: César Aira
- Original title: Cómo me hice monja
- Translator: Chris Andrews
- Language: Spanish
- Genre: Novel
- Publisher: Beatriz Viterbo
- Publication date: 1993
- Publication place: Argentina
- English publication date: 2007
- Media type: Print (Paperback)
- Pages: 117
- ISBN: 978-0-8112-1631-9
- OCLC: 71348670
- Dewey Decimal: 863/.64 22
- LC Class: PQ7798.1.I7 C6613 2007

How I Became a Nun by César Aira is a novel set in Rosario, Argentina, about a precocious six-year-old named César Aira. César the character, who claims to be, alternately, a boy and a girl (but mainly a girl), has a hyper-developed sense of reality, a plethora of hang-ups, and a casual relationship with the truth. Contrary to what the name suggests, it is not a story of religious awakening, and begins and ends in the same year of the life of the narrator. The Spanish version was first published in 1993. Chris Andrews’ English translation was published by New Directions in 2007.

== Plot summary ==
How I Became A Nun chronicles a year in the fantastic internal and external life of an introverted six-year-old called César, who sees herself as a girl but is referred to by the rest of the world as a boy. In the beginning of the novel, her family moves to a bigger town Rosario, where her father takes her for a promised Ice-cream. The child is horrified at the taste of the Strawberry ice-cream, which disappoints the father. He insists that she finish her ice-cream and stop being difficult. After tasting the ice-cream himself, he realizes it is contaminated and in an altercation ends up killing the ice-cream vendor. The child gets cyanide poisoning and spends her time in the hospital, often suffering from delusions. Once out of the hospital, she learns that her father has been sent to eight years of prison. She joins school, three months late into the class and finds herself disconnected from a class which has learned to read. Thus she gets drawn into her own world of make-believe and imagination. Her only friends are her mother and a boy named Arturo Carrera. In the end, she is kidnapped by the wife of the ice-cream vendor who was killed by her father. The wife, in an act of vengeance, throws Cesar into a drum of Strawberry ice-cream, which seems to have become the girl's biggest horror. The story as told by young César captures a child's sense of wonder and naivete, and blurs the categories of what is imagined and what is real.

== Reception ==
When How I Became a Nun debuted outside Argentina, it was "celebrated...as one of the ten most important books published in Spain that year" and called "a true masterpiece for our times". The Complete Review described the book as "an appealing novella, both a realistic evocation of childhood and childishness, as well as a more mature work of charming strangeness."
