= The Literary Conference =

The Literary Conference (Spanish: El congreso de literatura) is a novella by the Argentinean writer César Aira. The book follows the adventures of Aira as he attends a literary conference while attempting to take over the world by growing an army of Carlos Fuentes clones. Aira also pines for a beautiful woman from his past and must contend with unintended consequences of his cloning experiments that lead to catastrophe.

Critics have lauded The Literary Conference for its startling blend of science fiction, baroque surrealism, metaphysical incongruities, and hoary genre conventions borrowed from old B movies.

The original Spanish-language edition of the book was published by Tusquets in Argentina in 1997 under the title "El congreso de Literatura". In 2006, an English translation by Katherine Silver was published by New Directions.

== See also ==
- 3 Novels by César Aira
