= Recycling cooperative =

Worker-owned recycling organization

A recycling cooperative is an industrial cooperative, co-owned and maintained by workers, consumers or businesses. The cooperatives specialize in the recycling of various materials. Such cooperatives are either non-profit or not-for-profit; a major theoretical benefit of mass co-ownership is that raw recycled materials can become increasingly and equally distributed among the membership population at a low cost, be it for reusage at home or for reusage in the manufacturing of newer goods or versions of goods to be sold to customers at cheaper prices than would be possible with freshly obtained raw materials. A subset is the business recycling cooperative, which, according to the Northeast Recycling Council, is a group of business in a particular region, which separate recyclable waste, usually produced by their own functions, for prearranged collection by a shared hauler.
