= Mastronardi =

Mastronardi is a surname of Italian origin. Notable people with the surname include:

- Alessandra Mastronardi (born 1986), Italian actress
- Bart Mastronardi (born 1972), American director, screenwriter, cinematographer and producer
- Carlos Mastronardi (1901–1976), Argentine journalist, poet, and translator
- Horace Mastronardi, Swiss lawyer who tried to have the Jaccoud case verdict overturned
- Rino Mastronardi (born 1969), Italian racing driver
