= Excilia Saldaña =

Afro-Cuban juvenile literature writer, poet and academic

- Born: Excilia Saldaña Molina; 7 August 1946; Havana, Cuba
- Died: 20 July 1999 (aged 52); Havana, Cuba
- Occupations: children's literature writer, poet, academic
- Years active: 1966-1999
- Known for: Afro-Caribbean themes

Excilia Saldaña (7 August 1946 – 20 July 1999) was an Afro-Cuban juvenile literature writer, poet and academic. In 1984, she won the National Union of Writers and Artists of Cuba Special Prize La Rosa Blanca given for the best children's literature of the year for the first time and repeated that award four other times in her career. In 1995, she was a finalist in the International José Martí Prize for children's Literature awarded by the Costa Rican Ministry of Culture and the San Judas Tadeo Foundation. Three years later, her poetry garnered her the Nicolás Guillén Award.

== Biography ==
Excilia Saldaña Molina was born on 7 August 1946 in Havana, Cuba. She grew up with her grandmother, her teenaged mother, having been abandoned by Saldaña's father. After graduating from the Pedagogical Institute in Havana, she began work as a high school teacher. She became one of the group of writers and cultural figures who established the journal, El Caimán Barbudo (The Bearded Cayman) in 1966. Her first book of poetry Enlloró, an unpublished manuscript, won acclaim and received honorable mention in 1967 from the jury of the Casa de las Américas Prize. That same year, some of her poetry was translated into French and published in the journal Les Lettres Nouvelles. Saldaña left teaching in 1971 and began working as an editor at Editorial Casa de las Américas. The next year she became an editor at El Caimán Barbudo and then in 1975 moved to Editorial Gente Nueva.

Saldaña taught as a visiting professor in Santa Clara at the Félix Varela Teaching Institute and several other universities teaching children's literature. She was noted for her experimental forms which straddled the boundary between prose and poetry, blending in myth, folklore and meticulously studied cultural traditions. Her poetic works were often autobiographical or steeped in Afro-Cuban tradition, exploring the complexities of women's roles as both traditional mother and sexual being. Saldaña's poetry speaks about women's themes common in the Caribbean, abandonment, incest, sexual violence, shame, but also nurturing and redemption from other women.

Winning numerous awards throughout her career, Saldaña received the 1979 National Ismaelillo Prize from the National Union of Writers and Artists of Cuba (UNEAC) and the Rosa Blanca Prize from UNEAC in 1984. She won the Rosa Blanca Prize three years in a row in 1987, 1988 and 1989, and then again in 1995. That same year, Saldaña was a finalist in the International José Martí Prize for children's Literature awarded by the Costa Rican Ministry of Culture and the San Judas Tadeo Foundation and in 1998 she was honored with UNEAC's Nicolás Guilén Award for poetry.

Saldaña died on 20 July 1999 in Havana from complications of asthma.

== Selected works ==
- Saldaña, Excilia (1975). 10 poetas de la revolución (in Spanish). Havana, Cuba: Universidad de La Habana. OCLC 463040489.
- Saldaña, Excilia (1979). Un testigo de la historia (in Spanish). Havana, Cuba: Editorial Gente Nueva. OCLC 612575517.
- Saldaña, Excilia (1979). De la Isla del Tesoro a la Isla de la Juventud (in Spanish). Havana, Cuba: Editorial Gente Nueva. OCLC 610087957.
- Saldaña, Excilia (1980). Flor para amar: apuntes sobre la mujer en la obra de Martí (in Spanish). Havana, Cuba: Editorial Gente Nueva. OCLC 14990054.
- Saldaña, Excilia (1980). Soñando y viajando (in Spanish). Havana, Cuba: Editorial Gente Nueva. OCLC 657123650.
- Saldaña, Excilia (1981). Poesías de amor y combate (in Spanish). Havana, Cuba: Editorial Gente Nueva. OCLC 651896531.
- Saldaña, Excilia; Muñoz Bach, Eduardo (1983). Cantos para un Mayito y una paloma (in Spanish). Havana, Cuba: Unión de Escritores y Artistas de Cuba. OCLC 656992437.
- Saldaña, Excilia (1986). Bulgaria, el país de las rosas (in Spanish). Havana, Cuba: Editorial Gente Nueva. OCLC 22964381.
- Saldaña, Excilia (1987). Kele kele (in Spanish). Havana, Cuba: Editorial Letras Cubanas. OCLC 654723507.
- Saldaña, Excilia; Chericián, David (1988). Compay Tito (in Spanish). Havana, Cuba: Editorial Gente Nueva. OCLC 938887300.
- Saldaña, Excilia (1989). El refranero de la víbora (in Spanish). Havana, Cuba: Editorial Letras Cubanas. OCLC 23822689.
- Saldaña, Excilia (1989). La noche (in Spanish). Havana, Cuba: Editorial Gente Nueva. OCLC 30434297.
- Saldaña, Excilia (1991). Mi nombre: antielegía familiar (in Spanish). Havana, Cuba: Unión de Escritores y Artistas de Cuba. OCLC 30860388.
- Saldaña, Excilia (1992). El misterioso caso de los maravillosos cascos de doña Cuca Bregante (in Spanish). Havana, Cuba: Editorial Capitán San Luis. OCLC 39872156.
- Saldaña, Excilia (1998). Lengua de trapo y todos los trapoanudadores del mundo (in Spanish). Havana, Cuba: Editorial Gente Nueva. ISBN 978-9-590-80177-8. OCLC 433006798.
- Saldaña, Excilia (October 2000). "Lo cotidiano trascendente: Reflexiones sobre mi obra poética". Afro-Hispanic Review (in Spanish). 19 (2). Nashville, Tennessee: Department of Spanish and Portuguese, Vanderbilt University: 8–11. ISSN 0278-8969.
- Saldaña, Excilia (October 2000). "Tríptico de los contrasonetos anacrónicos". Afro-Hispanic Review (in Spanish). 19 (2). Nashville, Tennessee: Department of Spanish and Portuguese, Vanderbilt University: 14. ISSN 0278-8969.
- Saldaña, Excilia (October 2000). "Vieja Trova sobre soporte CD ROOM". Afro-Hispanic Review (in Spanish). 19 (2). Nashville, Tennessee: Department of Spanish and Portuguese, Vanderbilt University: 15–20. ISSN 0278-8969.
- Saldaña, Excilia (2000). Jícara de miel: el libro de todas mis nanas. Schomburg Children's Collection (in Spanish). Havana, Cuba: Editorial Gente Nueva. ISBN 978-9-590-80236-2. OCLC 44569923.
- Saldaña, Excilia (2002). González Mandri, Flora María; Rosenmeier, Rosamond (eds.). In the Vortex of the Cyclone: Selected Poems (in Bislama). Gainesville, Florida: University Press of Florida. ISBN 978-0-8130-2459-2.
- Saldaña, Excilia (2002). La lechuza y el sijú (in Spanish). Havana Cuba: Editorial Gente Nueva. ISBN 978-959-08-0040-5.
- Saldaña, Excilia (2003). Mi nombre (in Spanish). Havana, Cuba: Ediciones Unión. ISBN 978-9-592-09497-0.
