= Eloísa Cartonera =

Publishing cooperative

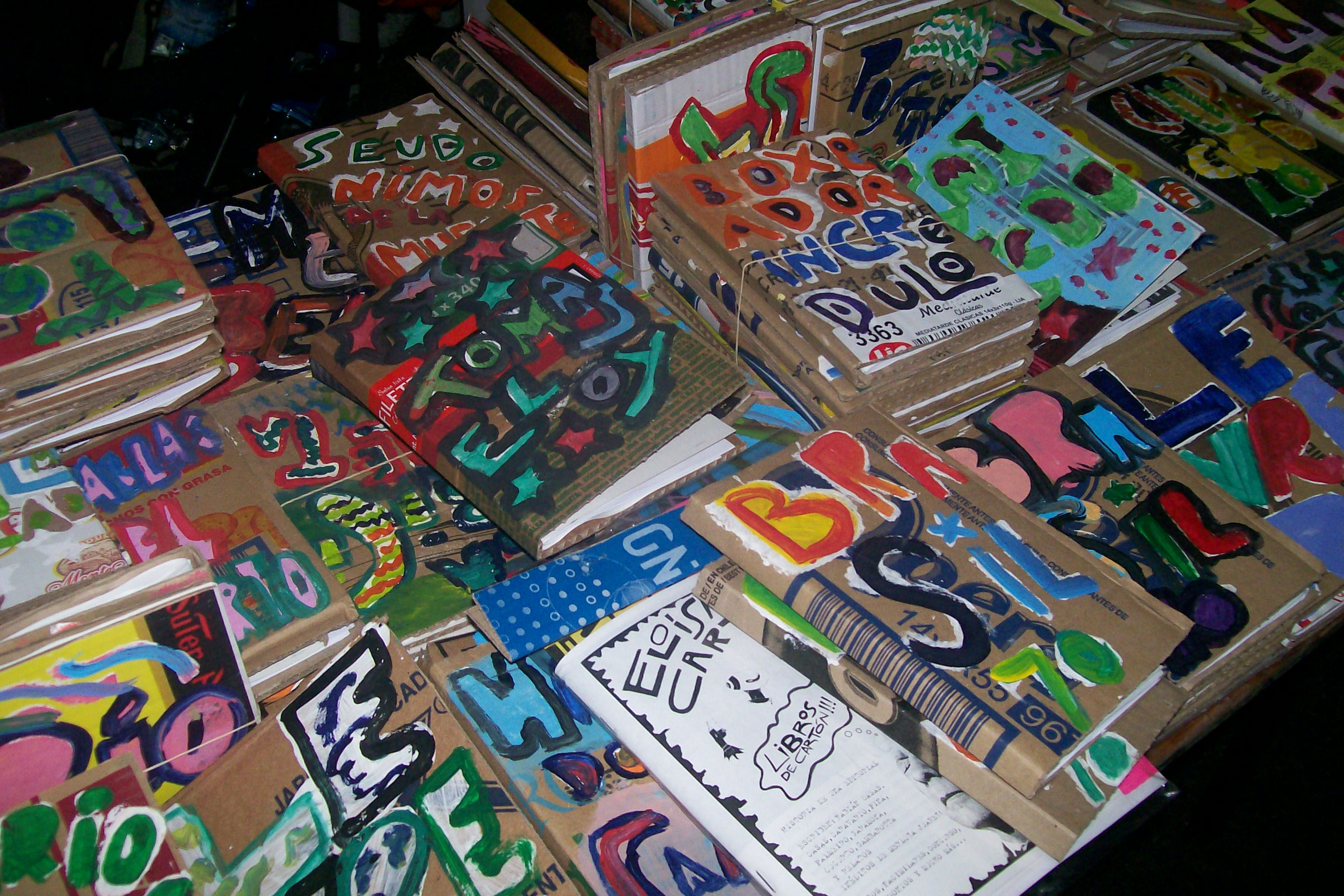
- Founded: 2001
- Founder: Washington Cucurto, Javier Barilaro and Fernanda Laguna
- Country of origin: Argentina
- Headquarters location: Buenos Aires
- Publication types: La casa de cartón of Martín Adán, El pianista of Ricardo Piglia, El todo que surca la Nada of César Aira and the bilingual volume of verses of Haroldo de Campos
- Fiction genres: Literature
- Official website: http://www.eloisacartonera.com.ar/

Eloísa Cartonera is an Argentine cooperative publishing business of designers and writers, which publishes hand made books with extraordinary designs at a literary quality. It is the pioneer of the Cartonera movement.

== Background ==
The initiative for Eloísa Cartonera was taken in 2001 when the Argentine economy was in crisis and people went on the streets to earn money. Among them were the so-called cartoneros, translated cardboard people, who worked on the streets to collect paper and cardboard as a way of living. In these years the culture sector found itself in a deep crisis, because books and artifacts were sold in reduced quantities.

Due to this situation writer Washington Cucurto and plastic artists Javier Barilaro and Fernanda Laguna started making art books made from waste cardboard. Out of solidarity with the employed, the objective of the making of art books was changed in 2003 to making literature accessible for anyone.

Established as well as upcoming Latin American writers have donated novels, stage plays and poems, with the result that ten years after its foundation more than 200 titles have been published. Examples are La casa de cartón (The Cardboard House) of Martín Adán, El pianista (The pianist) of Ricardo Piglia, El todo que surca la Nada (The Everything that Cuts the Nothing) of César Aira and the bilingual volume of verses of Haroldo de Campos.

The texts are bound manually in cardboard covers that have been hand-painted as well. Eloísa Cartonera publishes these works at prices that are often lower than the average paperback, whilst the cartoneros are offered a better price for the cardboard. Eloísa Cartonera has been the example for more than sixty cardboard publishers in Latin America and one in Mozambique.

== Recognition ==
In 2012 Eloísa Cartonera was rewarded with the Principal Award of the Dutch Prince Claus Awards for generation beauty, intellectual incentives and income for many in a context of financial crisis and poverty.
