= María Dhialma Tiberti =

Argentine writer (1928–1987)

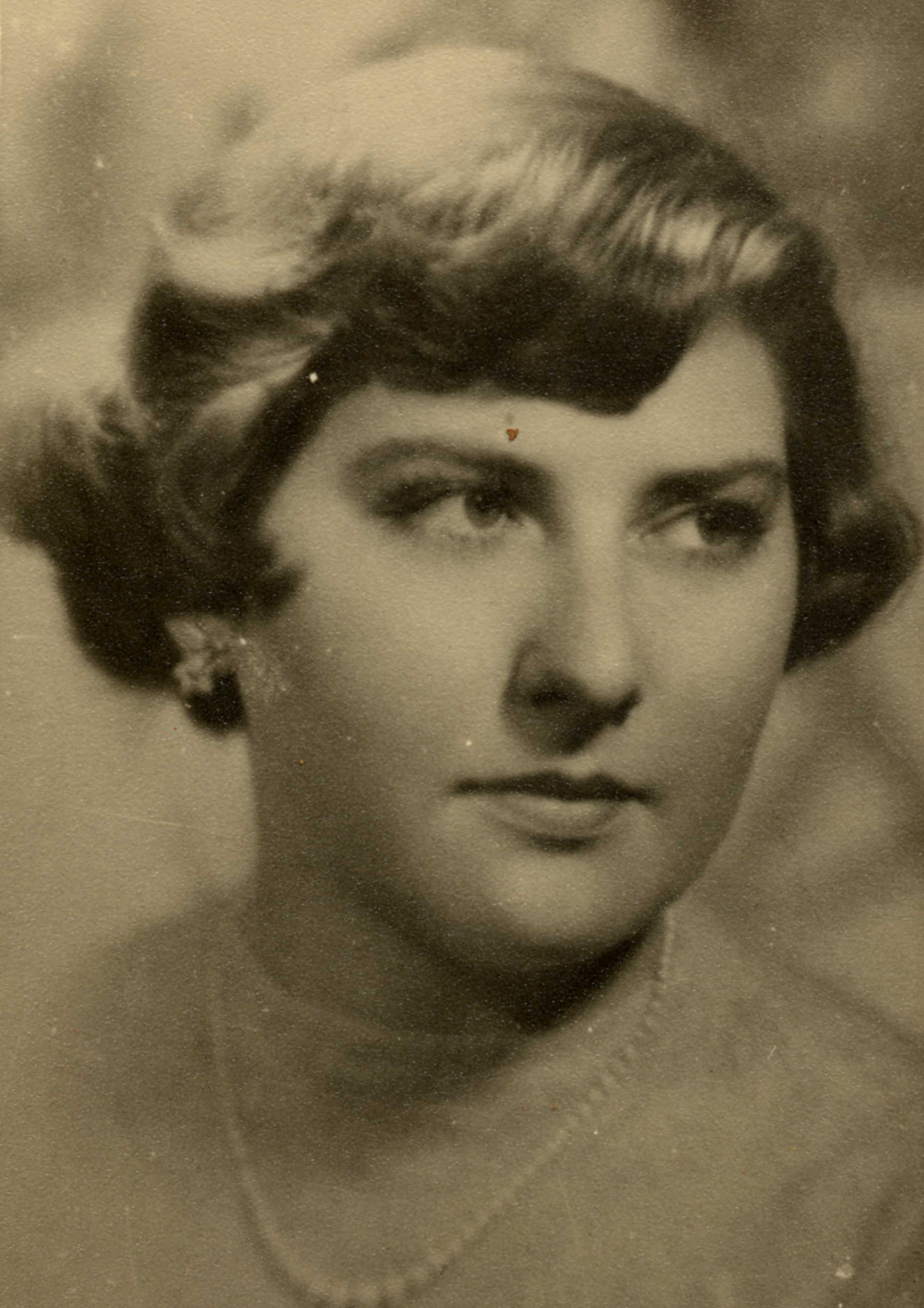
María Dhialma Tiberti

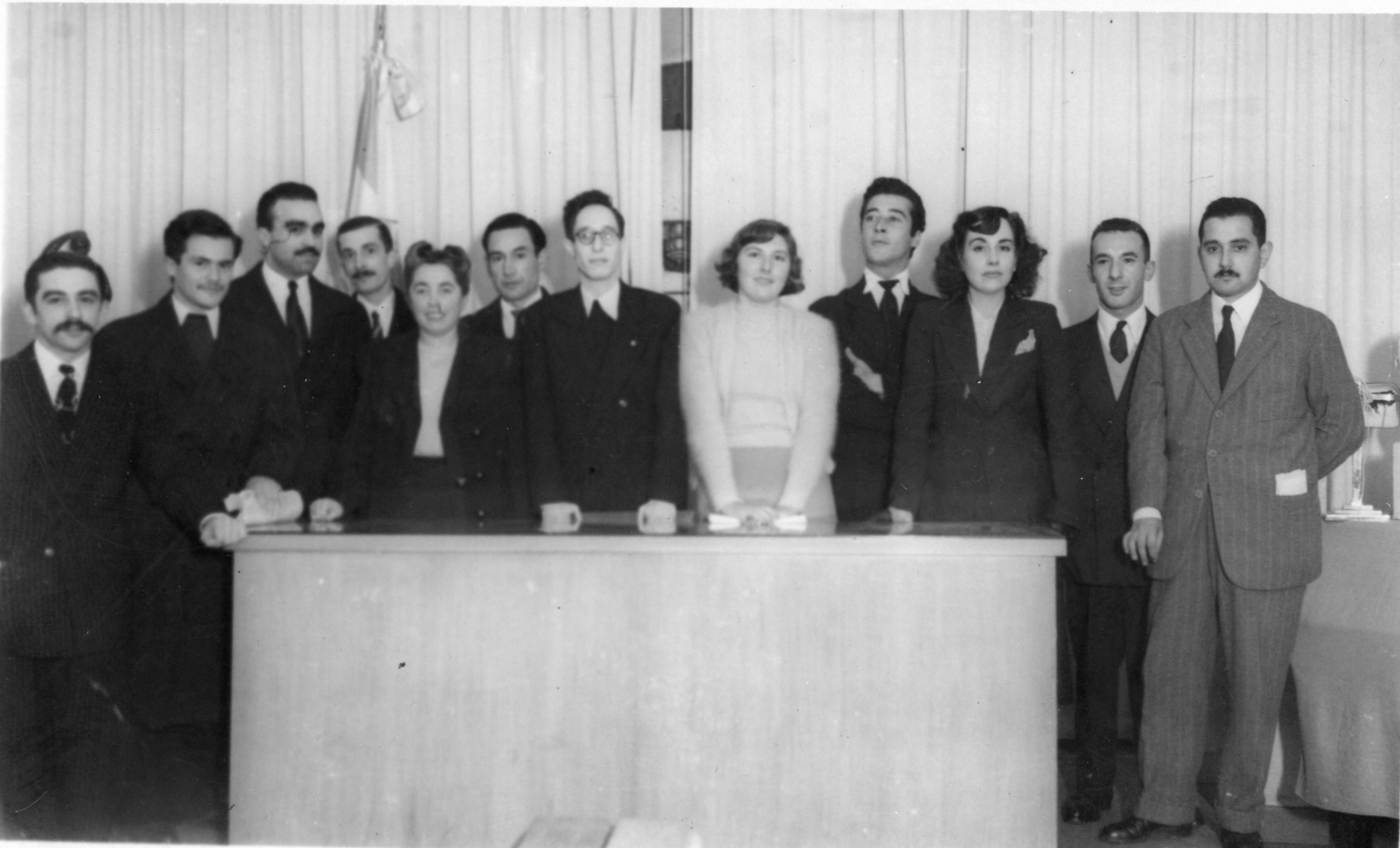
"Ediciones del Bosque", writers of La Plata, Buenos Aires, Argentina, ca 1950

María Dhialma Tiberti (La Plata, Argentina, 25 October 1928 – San Isidro, Argentina, 16 January 1987) was an Argentine writer. Married to the well known scientist Gregorio Baro, she studied at the Escuela Normal Nº1 Mary O’Graham, and later on, literature and history, at the Universidad Nacional de La Plata. She was responsible for the Del Bosque editions, composed of works of other well-known writers, such as Raúl Amaral, Horacio Ponce de León, Ana Emilia Lahite, and María de Villarino, who were all part of the so-called Generation del 40.

She worked for several newspapers and specialized magazines, and was a member of the Argentine Society of Writers (SADE, in Spanish) as well as of a large number of cultural and social institutions. She won some prizes, among which was the Consejo del Escritor for her short story Niña en la ventana, and another for her novel Estimado señor Gris.

== Works ==
=== Poetry ===
- Cielo Recto (1947),
- Tierra de amapolas (1949),
- Las sombras amarillas (1949)

=== Novels ===
- Los Títeres (1948),
- Estimado señor Gris (1967)

== Sources ==
- BULLRICH, Silvina, Atlántida, Buenos Aires, Argentina, enero de 1948
- REGA MOLINA, Horacio, El Mundo, Buenos Aires, Argentina, 2 de mayo de 1949
- VERBITSKY, Bernardo, Noticias gráficas, Buenos Aires, Argentina, 13 de septiembre de 1949
- CASAL, Julio J., Pregón, Montevideo, Uruguay, 5 de octubre de 1949
- AMARAL, Raúl, Alfar, Montevideo, Uruguay, Nº 88, 1950
- PAEZ, Marco Tulio, El heraldo, Caracas, Venezuela, junio de 1951
- PERCAS, Helena, Revista Iberoamericana, New York, NY, EEUU, 1954
- GRACIAN, El comercio, Quito, Ecuador, 16 de mayo de 1952
- SARAVI CISNEROS, Roberto, Primera antología poética platense, Editorial Clarida, Buenos Aires, Argentina, julio de 1956, pp. 183–188
- PERCAS, Helena, La poesía femenina argentina, Ediciones Cultura Hispánica, Madrid, España, 1958, pp. 540–550
- GIMENEZ PASTOR, Marta y José Daniel VIACAVA, Selección poética femenina 1940-1960, Ediciones culturales argentinas del Ministerio de Educación y Justicia, Buenos Aires, Argentina, 1965, pp. 267–270
- SOSA de NEWTON, Lily, Diccionario biográfico de mujeres argentinas, Editorial Plus Ultra, Buenos Aires, Argentina, 1980, pp. 459–460
- "El Día", La Plata, 14 de abril de 1956
- "Quien es quien en la Argentina: biografias contemporaneas", Ediciones G. Kraft, 1968. Pag. 601
- Ministerio de Educación, "Revista de Educación", Buenos Aires, Dirección General de Escuelas. Pag. 59.
- Universidad Central de Venezuela, "La novela Iberoamericana Contemporánea", Organización de Bienestar Estudiantil, 1968. Pag. 252.
- Comisión Nacional de Cultura, "Guía quincenal de la actividad intelectual y artística Argentina", Pag. 62
- RUMAZO, Lupe, "Yunques y crisoles americanos: Ensayos", Ediciones EDIME, 1967. Pag. 46
- GONZALEZ, Joaquín Victor, "Universidad "nueva" y ámbitos culturales platenses", Universidad Nacional de La Plata, Departamento de Letras, 1963. Pag. 254.
- MARTINEZ, David, "Poesía argentina actual, 1930-1960", Ediciones Culturales Argentinas, Ministerio de Educación y Justicia, Dirección General de Cultura, 1961. Pag. 128.
- "Libros de hoy: Publicación de información literaria y bibliográfica". Pag. 531.
- Instituto Nacional de Estudios de Teatro, "Revista de estudios de teatro", 1959.Pag. 36.
- PAZ, Carlos, "Efemérides literarias argentinas: Cine, Teatro, prensa, instituciones" Ediciones Caligraf, 1999.
- RIVADENEYRA, Altamiro y Sulbey NARANJA de ADARMES, "Primer Encuentro Latinoamericano de Educadores Universitarios: 8-13 de julio de 1996, Caracas, Venezuela", Universidad Nacional Experimental Simón Rodríguez, Universidad Central de Venezuela, Universidad Pedagógica Experimental Libertador, Fondo Editorial Tropykos, 1997.
- International Institute of Ibero-American Literature, "Revista Iberoamericana", 1953.
- GIMENEZ CABALLERO, Ernesto, "Las Mujeres de América", Editora Nacional, 1971. P.336.
- "Quién es quién en la Sociedad Argentina", Publicado por Ediciones Elite, 1982.
- BALLESTEROS ROSAS, Luisa, La Escritora en la sociedad latinoamericana, Cali, Colombia, Editorial Universidad del Valle, 1997. P. 276.
- VENTURINI, Aurora, "María Dhialma Tiberti: Las sombras amarillas", Diario El Día, Revista Domingo, 09/01/2011.
