= Mario Luna Romero =

Mario Luna Romero is a tribal secretary of the Yaqui (Yoeme) tribe of Vícam, Sonora. He was a notable spokesperson for the Yaqui people's resistance to the Independence Aqueduct planned in their territory in Sonora. Through 2012 and 2013 the Yaqui of Sonora have blocked major roads. Romero was arrested in September 2014 on charges of kidnapping and autotheft.
