= Ivonne Bordelois =

Argentine poet, essayist and linguist (born 1934)

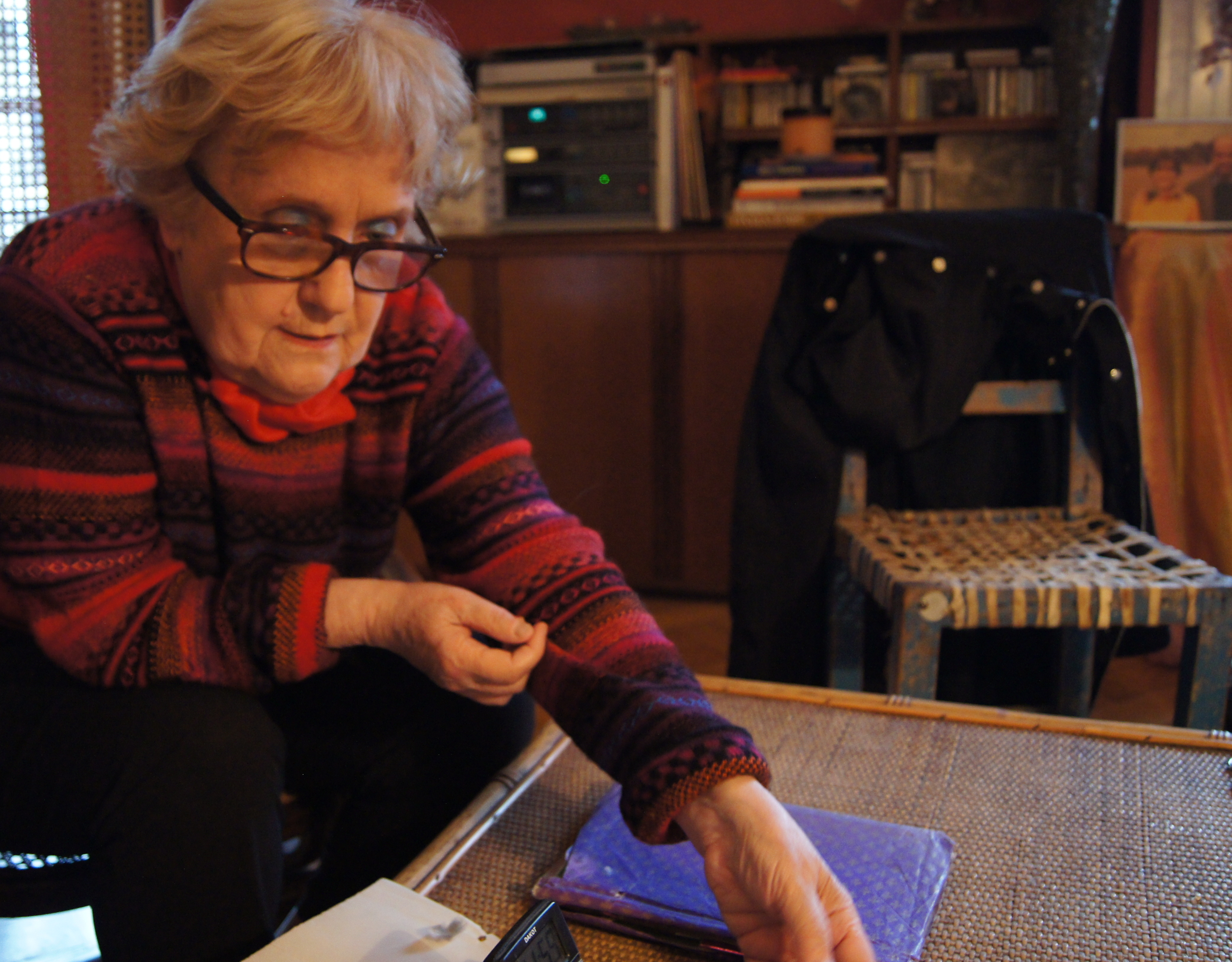
- Born: Ivonne Aline Bordelois; 5 November 1934 (age 91); Juan Bautista Alberdi, Argentina
- Education: Massachusetts Institute of Technology
- Occupations: Poet, essayist, linguist
- Awards: Konex Award (2004)

Ivonne Aline Bordelois (born 5 November 1934), is an Argentine poet, essayist, and linguist.

== Career ==
Ivonne Bordelois graduated from the Faculty of Philosophy and Letters at the University of Buenos Aires, later studying literature and linguistics at the Sorbonne. She worked at the magazine Sur and conducted interviews and publications with Alejandra Pizarnik for various national and international publications.

In 1968 she received a scholarship from the National Scientific and Technical Research Council (CONICET) and moved to Boston to study at the Massachusetts Institute of Technology. There she received her doctorate in linguistics in 1974, with Noam Chomsky as the director of her thesis. From 1975 to 1988 she held a chair of linguistics at the Ibero-American Institute of Utrecht University, obtained through international competition. In 1982 she received a Guggenheim Fellowship. In 2004 she received the Konex Award Merit Diploma in the Literary Essay category, and served on the award's jury in 2006, 2014, and 2016. In 2005 she was awarded the La Nación-Sudamericana prize for her essay El país que nos habla.

== Works ==
- El alegre apocalipsis (1st ed.). Grupo Editor Latinoamericano. 1995. ISBN 978-950-694-420-9.
- Genio y figura de Ricardo Güiraldes (1st ed.). Eudeba. 1998. ISBN 978-950-23-0853-1.
- Correspondencia a Pizarnik (1st ed. 1st reimp. ed.). Seix Barral. 1999. ISBN 978-950-731-203-8.
- Un triángulo crucial: Borges, Lugones y Güiraldes (1st ed.). Eudeba. 1999. ISBN 978-950-23-0922-4.
- La palabra amenazada (1st ed.). Libros del Zorzal. 2003. ISBN 978-987-1081-16-5.
- Etimología de las pasiones (1st ed.). Libros del Zorzal. 2005. ISBN 978-987-1081-92-9.
- El país que nos habla (1st ed. 4th reimp. ed.). Sudamericana. 2006. ISBN 978-950-07-2689-4.
- Villa Ocampo (1st ed. 2nd reimp. ed.). Sudamericana. 2008. ISBN 978-950-07-2709-9. Co-author with Fabio Grementieri.
- El sabor de las palabras (1st ed.). Libros del Zorzal. 2008. ISBN 978-987-599-110-1.
- A la escucha del cuerpo (1st ed.). Libros del Zorzal. 2008. ISBN 978-987-599-125-5.
- Del silencio como porvenir (1st ed.). Libros del Zorzal. 2010. ISBN 978-987-599-156-9.
- Nueva correspondencia Pizarnik (1st ed.). Aguilar, Altea, Taurus, Alfaguara. 2014. ISBN 978-987-04-3599-0. Co-author with Cristina Piña.
- Noticias de lo indecible (1st ed.). Edhasa. 2018. ISBN 978-987-628-479-0.
