= Nemer Saadé =

Lebanese fashion designer for men (born 1976)

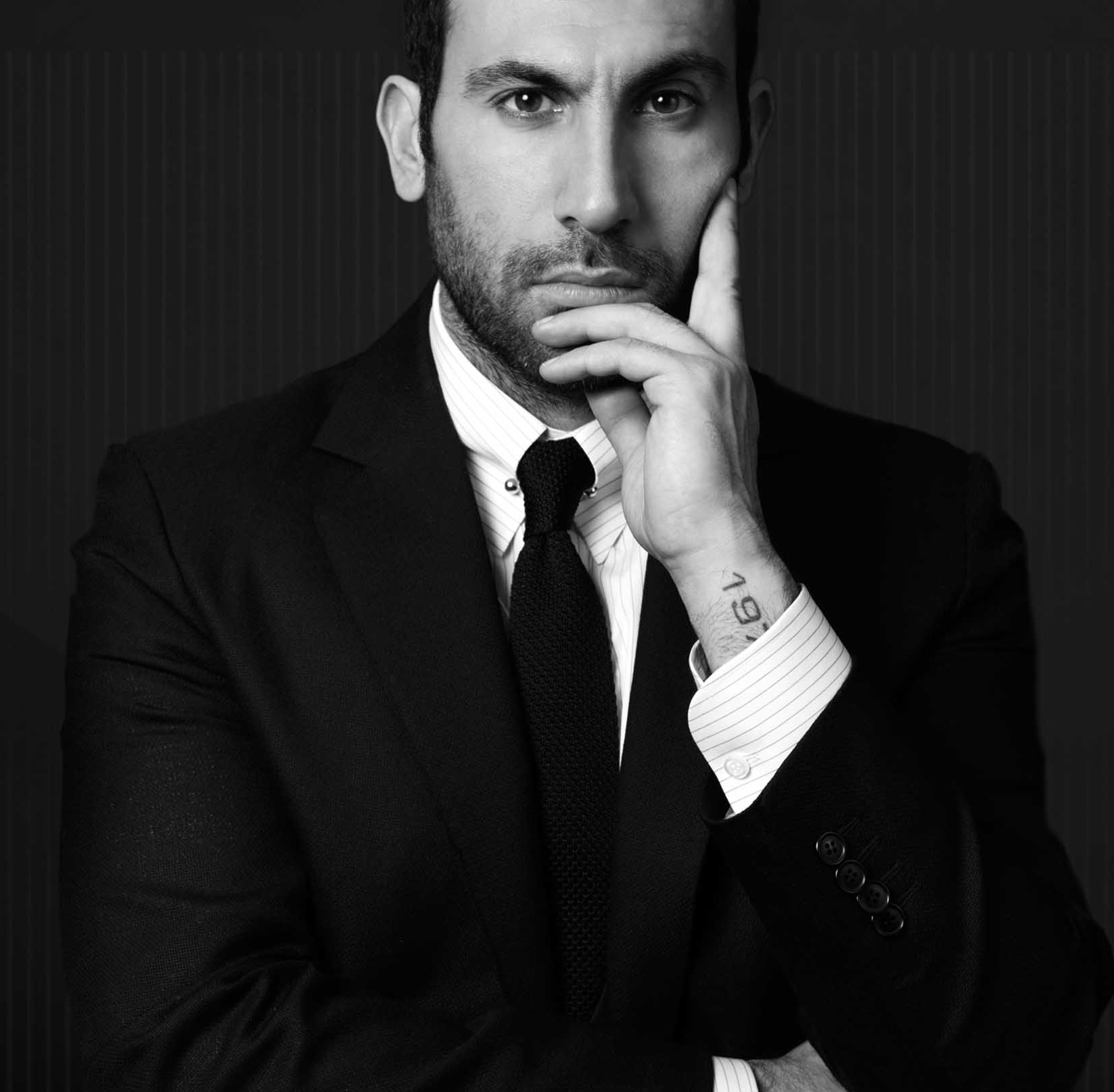
- Nemer Saadé, 2011
- Born: 1976; Beirut, Lebanon
- Education: Esmod
- Occupation: Fashion designer
- Label: Nemer Saade

Nemer Saadé (Arabic: نمر سعاده) (born September 29, 1976, in Beirut) is a Lebanese fashion designer who is the Creative Director of the eponymous luxury brand Nemer Saade.

== Biography ==
During the Lebanese Civil War, his family moved to Cairo, Egypt.

In 2002, Nemer returned to Beirut to enroll at ESMOD to study Pattern Making, Moulage, and Design. Upon graduation, he launched his eponymous brand Nemer Saadé Couture in Beirut. Nemer Saade held its first fashion show in Beirut to present the brand's latest collection. The event was broadcast on Fashion TV and covered by local and international media outlets. In 2008, the brand presented the Nemer Saade Fall/Winter 2008–2009 Collection in a fashion show held on An Nahar building, Beirut Central District. The following year, in 2009, Nemer Saadé revealed the brand's Fall/Winter 2009–2010 Collection in an underground parking lot in Beirut.

In 2012, Nemer Saade participated in the Lebanese Great British Week as the sole Fashion Designer, presenting menswear pieces by the brand, including a high-fashion military uniform that was bought by the then British Ambassador to Lebanon, Tom Fletcher. In 2021, Nemer Saade launched the brand's first Thob Collection, which was then followed by two collections that featured items for women under the title of "Nemer Saade for Her"

== Personal life ==
Nemer Saade married Armenian makeup artist and model Arpi Atoyan in 2014. The couple have three children together.
