= Vicenta Castro Cambón =

Argentine poet

Vicenta Castro Cambón (1882–1928) was an Argentine poet born in Buenos Aires on 28 September 1882. At the age of six, she became blind. In 1924, she founded the Argentine Library for the Blind. Her most renowned works include "Rumores de mi noche" ("Rumors of my Night") and "Cajita de música" ("Music Box"). She died on 7 May 1928, aged 45.
