= Washington Cucurto =

Argentine writer (born 1973)

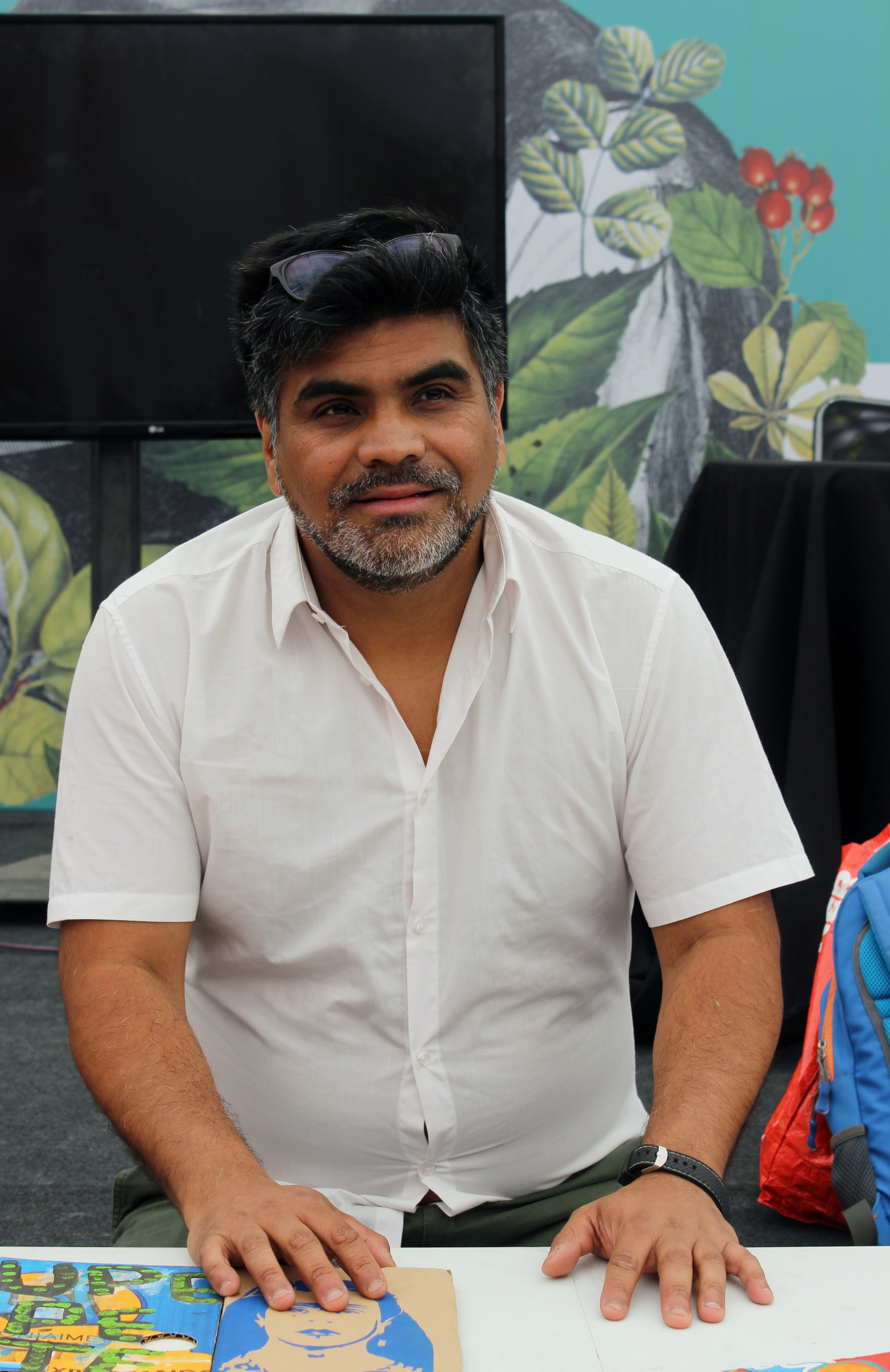

Santiago Vega (born in 1973 in Quilmes), better known as Washington Cucurto, is an Argentinian writer of fiction, prose and poetry. He is the self-proclaimed creator of realismo atolondrado ('headlong realism'). His writing shares tendencies of American authors like Charles Bukowski, William S. Burroughs and Henry Miller. Because of his subject matter and style, he is a cult author, especially among young readers. His work deals with negritude, poverty, homosexuality, and other fringe cultures. In 2002 he founded Eloísa Cartonera, an extremely successful non-profit publishing house specializing in handmade and affordable books from recycled materials.

== Works ==
- Zelarayán, 1996, (poetry)
- La máquina de hacer paraguayitos, 1999, (poetry)
- Veinte pungas contra un pasajero, 2003, (poetry)
- Hatuchay, 2005, (poetry)
- Como un paraguayo ebrio y celoso de su hermana, 2005, (poetry)
- Upepeté. Noticias del Paraguay, poetry, (2009)
- El tractor, poetry, (2009)
- Poeta en Nueva York, poetry, (2010)
- Macanas, poetry, (2009, with pseudonym Humberto Anachuri)
- El Hombre polar regresa a Stuttgart, poetry, (2010)
- Cosa de negros, novella (2003),
- Noches vacías, cumbiela (2003)
- Panambí, cumbiela (2003),
- Fer, cumbiela (2004),
- La luna en tus manos, story (2004),
- Las aventuras del Sr. Maíz, story (2005),
- Hasta quitarle Panamá a los yanquis, novel (2005),
- El amor es mucho más que una novela de 500 páginas, novella (2008)
- El curandero del amor, novella (2006),
- 1810. La revolución vivida por los negros, historical novel (2008),
- Idalina, historia de una mujer sudamericana, novella (2009),
- El Rey de la cumbia contra los fucking Estados Unidos de América, story (2010),
- Pulgas y cucarachas, story (2010)
- Sexibondi, novella (2011)

== Translations ==
Translations exist in English, German, French and (Brazilian) Portuguese:

- Some Dollars (Collection), by Jordan Lee Schnee
- Die Maschine die kleine Paraguayerinnen macht, by Timo Berger
- Schuhe aus Leinen, by Timo Berger
- Coisas de Negros
- Zelarayán, by Geneviève Orssaud
