= Osvaldo Lamborghini =

Argentine writer (1940–1985)

Osvaldo Lamborghini (April 12, 1940 – November 18, 1985) was an Argentine writer of the 1960s and 70s avant-gardes. His work is not easily lumped into traditional generic categories, as it spans and combines elements of poetry, prose fiction, and theatre.

== Life and work ==
Born in Buenos Aires, Lamborghini's first book appeared in that city in 1969. It was titled El fiord, and it is a complex, violent allegory of radical politics in 1960s Argentina. It circulated clandestinely, could only be found at one bookstore, and acquired a mythical status within the Argentine literary scene. His second book, Sebregondi retrocede appeared in 1973. It is a long poem in prose centered on the figure of the Marquis of Sebregondi (according to the author an incarnation of Witold Gombrowicz), Pepe Bianco, and an Italian uncle of Lamborghini. Poemas appeared in 1980 and was the last of his books published during his lifetime.

During the 1970s, Lamborghini was associated with the avant-garde magazine Literal in which he published several poems. The magazine was heavily influenced by the French psychoanalyst Jacques Lacan, particularly by way of the writings of Oscar Masotta, who was instrumental in bringing Lacanian thought to the Spanish-speaking world. Other notable figures associated with Literal include Germán García, Luis Gusmán, Héctor Libertella, and Josefina Ludmer.

Lamborghini published several other texts during his lifetime, mostly in small magazines such as Sitio. In the early eighties he lived in Barcelona and returned in 1982 to Mar del Plata, Argentina, where, convalescent, he wrote the novel-length triptych Las hijas de Hegel. During his final years he wrote the long text Tadeys and the seven volumes of the multimedia Teatro proletario de cámara. He died of a heart attack in Barcelona in 1985.

Lamborghini is commonly associated with the neobarroco (neobaroque) aesthetic, of which his friends Arturo Carrera and Néstor Perlongher were prominent representatives and which follows on the work of Cuban writers José Lezama Lima and Severo Sarduy. The Argentine novelist, translator, and essayist César Aira has been responsible for the posthumous diffusion of his work. The first of these posthumous volumes appeared in 1988 under the title Novelas y cuentos, and it included an important epilogue by Aira himself. The collection was reprinted in 2003 in two volumes by the editorial Sudamericana. His collected poetry and Tadeys followed shortly after. The Teatro proletario de cámara appeared in a limited-edition deluxe version in Spain in 2008.

== List of Publications ==
- El fiord (Chinatown, 1969)
- Sebregondi retrocede (Noé, 1973)
- "Matinales (aguas del alba)", in Clarín, 1974
- "Neibis (maneras de fumar en el salón literario)", in Crisis magazine, 1975
- "La mañana", in Escandalar magazine, 1979
- "Sonia (o el final)", in Feeling magazine, 1979
- "La novia del gendarme", in Sitio magazine, 1985
- Novelas y cuentos (Ediciones del Serbal, 1988)
- Palacio de los aplausos, o el suelo del sentido, in collaboration with Arturo Carrera (Beatriz Viterbo, 2002)
- Novelas y cuentos, 2 volumes (Sudamericana, 2003)
- Poemas, 1969-1985 (Sudamericana, 2004)
- Tadeys (Sudamericana, 2005)
- Teatro proletario de cámara (ARPublicaciones, 2008)
- ¡Marc!, in collaboration with Gustavo Trigo (Puente Aéreo Ediciones, 2013)

== English Translations ==
- Two Stories. Containing “The Morning” and “Just Write Anything!". Trans. Jessica Sequeira. Seattle: Sublunary Editions, 2020.
- "Three Poems". ("Mercury marbles", "LIGHT WISHES TO INTRODUCE THE ASTONISHING, SO OBVIOUS PENIS", "Wrapped in an apocalyptical peace".) Translated by Luis Chitarroni. In Firmament, Issue 1.1. Seattle: Sublunary Editions, 2021. Pp. 27-30.
- Soto, Kevin Paul (Spring 2016). A Blank Space Extended: On the Poetics of Osvaldo Lamborghini (Senior Project). p. 105. Includes English translations of "The Fjord" and "Sebregondi Recedes".
