= Arturo Carrera =

Argentine poet (born 1948)

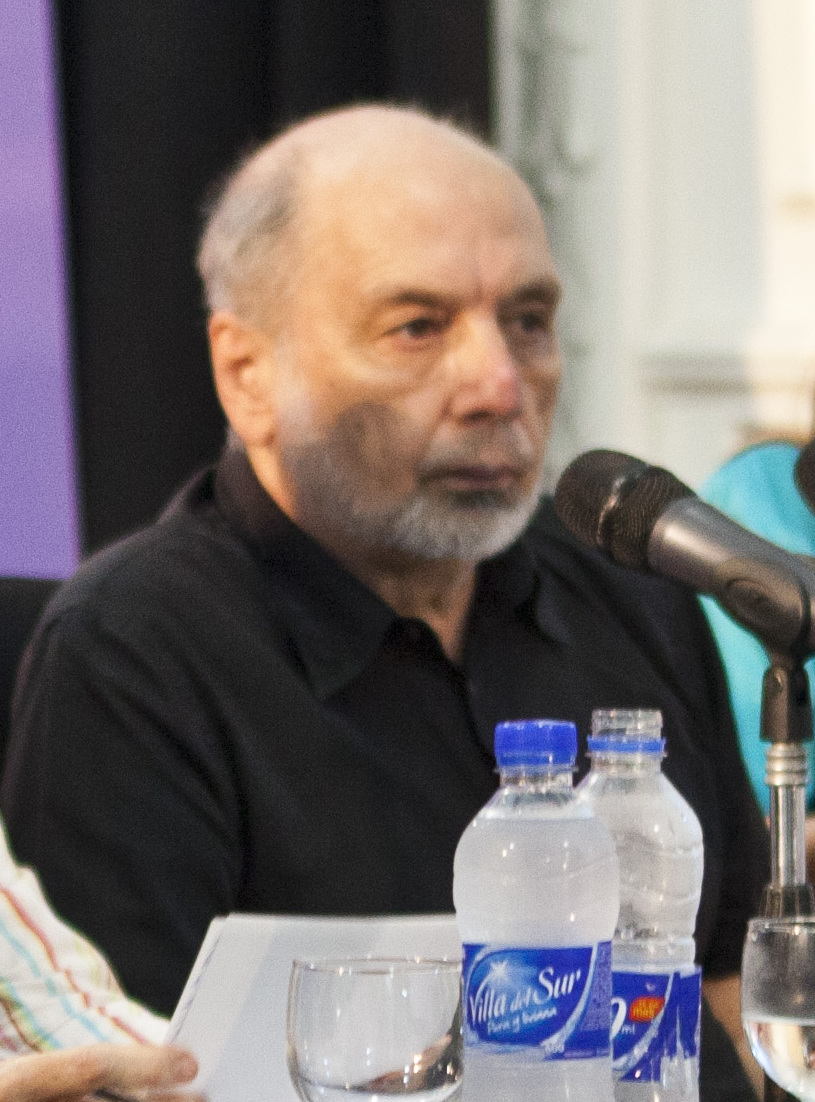
- Born: 27 March 1948 (age 78); Coronel Pringles, Argentina
- Occupation: Poet

Arturo Carrera (born 27 March 1948) is an Argentine poet.

== Biography ==
Arturo Carrera was born on 27 March 1948 in Coronel Pringles, Buenos Aires Province.

In 1966, he moved to Buenos Aires where he worked on various literary projects with the writer César Aira, also from Coronel Pringles, with whom he founded the literary magazine El Cielo. During the 1980s he joined the editorial team of the magazine XUL.

== Books published ==
=== Poetry ===
- Momento de simetría, Buenos Aires: Sudamericana, 1973 / Curitiba, Brasil: Oroboro Nro. 4, Editora Medusa, 2005. Translation into Brazilian Portuguese by Ricardo Corona and Joca Woolf.
- Oro, Buenos Aires: Sudamericana, 1975.
- La partera canta, Buenos Aires: Sudamericana, 1982.
- Arturo y yo, Buenos Aires: Ediciones de la Flor, 1983 / Córdoba: Editorial Alción, 2002. Epilogue by Edgardo Dobry.
- Mi Padre, Buenos Aires: Ediciones de la Flor, 1985.
- Animaciones suspendidas, Buenos Aires: Losada, 1986.
- Ticket, Buenos Aires: Ediciones Último Reino, 1986.
- Negritos, Buenos Aires: Mickey Mikeranno, 1993.
- La banda oscura de Alejandro (fragments), México: Ed. Casa del Tiempo, National Autonomous University of Mexico, 1993. Prologue by Jacobo Sefamí.
- La banda oscura de Alejandro, Buenos Aires: Bajo la Luna Nueva, 1994. 2nd. edition, 1996.
- El vespertillo de las parcas, Buenos Aires: Tusquets, Colección "Marginales - Nuevos textos sagrados", 1997.
- Children's corner, Buenos Aires: Último Reino, 1989 / 2nd. edition Buenos Aires: Tusquets, Colección "Marginales - Nuevos textos sagrados", 1999.
- La construcción del espejo, Buenos Aires: Siesta, 2001.
- Monstruos, Antología de la joven poesía argentina, Buenos Aires: Fondo de Cultura Económica, Colección Tezontle, 2001. Selection and prologue.
- Tratado de las sensaciones, Valencia, Spain: Pre-Textos, 2002.
- El Coco, Buenos Aires: Ediciones Vox, 2003.
- Pizarrón, Buenos Aires: Eloisa Cartonera, 2004.
- Potlatch, Buenos Aires: Interzona Editores, 2004 / 2nd. edition Madrid, Spain: Ediciones Amargord, 2010.
- Carpe diem, México: Filodecaballos Edit., INCOCULT, 2004. Epilogue by César Aira.
- Noche y Día, Buenos Aires: Losada, 2005. Epilogue by César Aira.
- La inocencia, Buenos Aires: Ediciones Mansalva, 2006.
- Fotos imaginarias con nieve de verdad, México: Apuntes de lobotomía, 2008.
- Las cuatro estaciones, Buenos Aires: Ediciones Mansalva, 2008.

=== Essays ===
- Nacen los otros, Rosario: Beatriz Viterbo editora, 1993.
- Ensayos murmurados, Buenos Aires: Ediciones Mansalva, 2009.

=== Co-authored books ===
- Arturo Carrera, Alfredo Prior, Niños que nacieron peinados poems and paintings, Buenos Aires: Enargeis-Estación Pringles, 2007.
- Arturo Carrera, Osvaldo Lamborghini, Palacio de los Aplausos, Rosario: Beatriz Viterbo Editora, 2002.
- Teresa Arijón, Arturo Carrera, Edgardo Ruso, El libro de la luna, Buenos Aires: El Ateneo, Colección "El Taller del escritor", 1998.
- Teresa Arijón, Arturo Carrera, El libro de las criaturas que duermen a nuestro lado, Buenos Aires: El Ateneo, Colección "El Taller del escritor", 1997.
- Teresa Arijón, Arturo Carrera, Teoría del cielo, Buenos Aires, Editorial Planeta, "Biblioteca del Sur", 1992.
- Arturo Carrera, Emeterio Cerro, Retrato de un albañil adolescente & Telones zurcidos para títeres con himen, Ediciones Último Reino, Buenos Aires, 1988.

=== Poetry anthologies ===
- Ciudad del colibrí, Barcelona, Spain: Libres del mall, Serie iberica, 1982. Prologue by Andrés Sánchez Robayna.
- Children's corner, Macerata, Italy: Sestante, 1997. Translation into Italian and prologue by Alejandro Marcaccio.
- Animaciones suspendidas, Venezuela: Ediciones el otro@el mismo, 2006. Edited by Ana Porrúa. Epilogue by Juan José Cambre, Guillermo Kuitca and Alfredo Prior.

He has published translations of poets like Yves Bonnefoy, Stéphane Mallarmé, Henri Michaux, Haroldo de Campos, John Ashbery, Giorgio Agamben, Pier Paolo Pasolini and Sandro Penna.

His poems were translated into English, Swedish, Portuguese, French and Italian and he has been widely published in literary magazines and included in numerous anthologies such as 200 años de poesía argentina, Edited by Jorge Monteleone (Buenos Aires: Alfaguara. 2010), Almanacco dello specchio, Edited by Maurizio Cucchi and Antonio Riccardi (Italy: Mondadori, 2009), The Oxford Book of Latin American Poetry, Edited by Cecilia Vicuña and Ernesto Livon Grosman (New York: Oxford University Press, 2009), Una antología de la poesía Argentina (1970–2008), Edited by Jorge Fondebrider (Santiago de Chile: LOM Ediciones, 2008), Una gravedad alegre, Edited by Armando Romero (Valladolid, Spain: Ed. Difácil, 2007), PUENTES/ PONTES. Contemporary Argentina and Brazilian Poetry - bilingual edition, Edited by Heloísa Buarque de Holanda and Jorge Monteleone (Argentine: Fondo de Cultura Económica, 2003), Poesimöte i Malmö, poetry book (Sweden, 2003), Prístina y última piedra. Anthology of Latin American Poetry, Edited by Ernesto Lumbreras and Eduardo Milán (México: Aldus, 1999), El turno y la transición. Antología de la Poesía Latinoamericana del Siglo XXI, Edited by Julio Ortega (México: Siglo XXI, 1997), Medusario, Muestra de Poesía Latinoamericana, Edited by Roberto Echavarren, José Kozer and Jacobo Sefamí (México: Fondo de Cultura Económica, 1996), Poètes argentins, (France: Action Poétique Nº 138-139, 1995), Autores argentinos de fin de siglo, Prologue by Francisco Madariaga, Edited by Juano Villafañe (Buenos Aires: Instituto Movilizador de Fondos Cooperativos, 1995), A palavra poetica na América Latina. Avaliaçao de uma geraçao, Edited by Horacio Costa (São Paulo, Brazil: Fundaçao Memorial da America Latina, 1992), Antologia de poesia Hispano-Americana atual (São Paulo, Brazil: USP Nº 13, 1992), Caribe transplatino, Poesía neobarroca cubana y rioplatense, Edited by Néstor Perlongher (Saô Paulo, Brazil: Iluminuras, 1991), Antología de la poesía Hispanoamericana actual, Edited by Julio Ortega (México: Siglo XXI Ed., 1987).

He has been invited to read his work and to give workshops and conferences in Latin America, USA and Europe such as University of Santa Catarina in Brazil, University of Santiago in Chile, University of Los Andes in Venezuela, Princeton University, New York University, University of Pennsylvania, Ateneu Barcelonès, La Caixa Foundation (Madrid), Cosmopoética (Córdoba-Spain), Centro Nazionale di Studi Leopardiani (Recanati), University of Macerata (Italy), Stendhal-Grenoble University and Paris Sorbonne University.

He has written on the work of contemporary Argentine artists and founded, with the playwright and poet Emeterio Cerro, the puppet theatre El escándalo de la serpentina. Lorca style street theater that focused experience in painting and got together, among other artists, Enrique Aguirrezabala, Guillermo Kuitca, Juan Lecuona, Fabián Marcaccio, Alfredo Prior, Marcia Schvartz and the musicians Diana Baroni y Claudio Baroni.

Founded in 2006 together with Juan José Cambre, César Aira, Alfredo Prior and other artist friends ESTACIÓN PRINGLES: utopia that is now materialized in the form of a Literary Translator Center, poetic post, stopover and multiple interventions place, a platform or scene where scattered aesthetic practices can be added, articulated and made visible. Currently holds the post of president.

He received, among other distinctions, the National Poetry Prize Mauricio Kohen for his book Animaciones suspendidas (1985), the Antorchas Fellowship, career in the arts (1990), a John Simon Guggenheim Fellowship (1995), the First Poetry Prize of Buenos Aires City for his book La banda oscura de Alejandro (1998), Konex Prize on Poetry (2004) and Poetry Hispanoamerican Prize Festival de la Lira, Ecuador, for his book Las Cuatro Estaciones (2009).

Books of criticism on his poetry:

- La poesía de Arturo Carrera. Antología de la obra y la crítica, Edited by Juan Duchesne Winter and Nancy Fernández. Critical Works by Raúl Antelo, Mario Cámara, Ricardo Corona, Joaquín Correa, Sergio Chejfec, Nora Domínguez, Romina Freschi, Tamara Kamenszain, Reinaldo Laddaga, Daniel Link, Anahí Mallol, Silvio Mattoni, Alan Pauls, Paula Siganevich, Saúl Sosnowski, Ariel Schettini, Diego Vecchio and Joca Wolff (Pittsburgh University: Instituto Internacional de Literatura Iberoamericana, 2010).
- Muerte e infancia en la poesía de Arturo Carrera, Cecilia Pacella (Córdoba-Argentina: Ed. Recovecos, 2008).
- Experiencia y escritura. Sobre la poesía de Arturo Carrera, Nancy Fernández . (Rosario: Beatriz Viterbo Ed., 2007).
