= Mario Romero (poet) =

Argentine poet, playwright and translator

Mario Romero (February 15, 1943 – June 28, 1998) was an Argentine poet, playwright, and translator. Recordings of him reading his poetry have been placed in the Library of Congress.

== Works ==
=== Poetry ===
- Signals. Editorial Monopole, Tucumán, 1973.
- Painting blind. Editorial Stations, Madrid, 1982.
- The other launches. Editorial Siesta, Stockholm, 1983.
- The last cheek. Editorial mainland, Buenos Aires, 1988.
- Red ink on black ink. Editorial Orions, Stockholm, 1997.
- Old wall. Florida Blanca, Buenos Aires, 1998.
