= Nemer ibn el Barud =

Argentine poet (1925–2010)

- Born: 16 December 1925; San Juan, Argentina
- Died: 17 October 2010 (aged 84); Buenos Aires, Argentina
- Occupations: Poet, playwright
- Writing career
- Language: Spanish
- Genres: Poem, drama

Nemer ibn el Barud (1925–2010) was an Argentine poet of Lebanese descent.

== Life and career ==
Nemer ibn el Barud was born on 16 December 1925 in San Juan, Argentina. He worked as an academic in the Faculty of Social Sciences in the National University of San Juan and held provincial government posts, as well as writing for the newspaper Diario de Cuyo. In around 1980 he moved to Buenos Aires, where he died on 17 October 2010.

== Selected works ==
- "Astroliquen"
- "Credo del Caminante"
- "Deolinda correa"
- "Hombre Nuestro que estas en la Tierra"
- "Monosilabos"
- "Por Amor Al Amor"
