= César Aira =

Argentine writer & translator (born 1949)

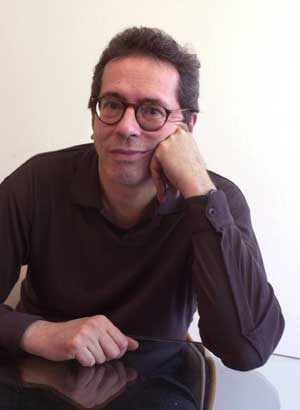
- César Aira in 2012
- Born: 23 February 1949 (age 77); Coronel Pringles, Buenos Aires Province, Argentina
- Occupations: Novelist; short story writer; essayist

César Aira (Argentine Spanish: [ˈsesaɾ ˈajɾa]; born 23 February 1949 in Coronel Pringles, Buenos Aires Province) is an Argentine writer and translator, and an exponent of contemporary Argentine literature. He has published over a hundred short books of stories, novels and essays. He has lectured at the University of Buenos Aires, on Copi and Arthur Rimbaud, and at the University of Rosario on Constructivism and Stéphane Mallarmé, and has translated and edited books from France, England, Italy, Brazil, Spain, Mexico, and Venezuela.

== Work ==
Besides his fiction, and the translation work he does for a living, Aira also writes literary criticism, including monographic studies of Copi, the poet Alejandra Pizarnik, and the nineteenth-century British limerick and nonsense writer Edward Lear. He wrote a short book, Las tres fechas (The Three Dates), arguing for the central importance, when approaching some minor eccentric writers, of examining the moment of their lives about which they are writing, the date of completion of the work, and the date of publication of the work. Aira also was the literary executor of the complete works of his friend the poet and novelist Osvaldo Lamborghini (1940–1985).

== Style ==
Aira has often spoken in interviews of elaborating an avant-garde aesthetic in which, rather than editing what he has written, he engages in a "flight forward" (fuga hacia adelante) to improvise a way out of the corners he writes himself into. Aira also seeks in his own work, and praises in the work of others (such as the Argentine-Parisian cartoonist and comic novelist Copi), the "continuum" (el continuo) of a constant momentum in the fictional narrative. As a result, his fictions can jump radically from one genre to another, and often deploy narrative strategies from popular culture and "subliterary" genres like pulp science fiction and television soap operas. He frequently refuses to conform to generic expectations for how a novel ought to end, leaving many of his fictions quite open-ended.

While his subject matter ranges from Surrealist or Dadaist themes to fantastic tales set in his Buenos Aires neighborhood of Flores, Aira also returns frequently to Argentina's nineteenth century (two books translated into English, The Hare and An Episode in the Life of a Landscape Painter, are examples of this; so is the best-known novel of his early years, Ema la cautiva (Emma, the Captive)). He also returns regularly to play with stereotypes of an exotic East, such as in Una novela china, (A Chinese Novel); El volante (The Flyer), and El pequeño monje budista (The Little Buddhist Monk). Aira also enjoys mocking himself and his childhood home town, Coronel Pringles, in fictions such as Cómo me hice monja (How I Became a Nun), Cómo me reí (How I Laughed), El cerebro musical (The Musical Brain) and Las curas milagrosas del doctor Aira (The Miraculous Cures of Dr. Aira). His novella La prueba (1992) served as the basis—or point of departure, as only the first half-hour follows the novella—of Diego Lerman's film Tan de repente (Suddenly) (2002). His novel Cómo me hice monja (How I Became a Nun) was selected as one of the ten best publications in Spain in the year 1998.

== Personal life ==
Aira lives in Flores, Buenos Aires. His wife, Liliana Ponce, is a poet and a scholar of Japanese literature. They have two children.

== Awards and honours ==
- Konex Award – translation (1994)
- Konex Award – novel (2004)
- Prix Roger Caillois (2014)
- Neustadt International Prize for Literature – finalist (2014)
- Man Booker International Prize – finalist (2015)
- America Awards (2016)
- Manuel Rojas Ibero-American Narrative Award (2016)
- Prix Formentor (2021)

== Bibliography ==
A partial bibliography:

=== Novels ===
- Moreira (1975). Achával Solo
- Ema, la cautiva (1981). Editorial de Belgrano
- La luz argentina (1983). CEAL
- El vestido rosa. Las ovejas (1984). Ada Korn Editora
- Canto castrato (1984). Javier Vergara Editor
- Una novela china (1987). Javier Vergara Editor
- Los fantasmas (1990). Grupo Editor Latinoamericano
- El bautismo (1991). Grupo Editor Latinoamericano
- La liebre (1991). Emecé
- Embalse (1992). Emecé
- La guerra de los gimnasios (1992). Emecé
- La prueba (1992). Grupo Editor Latinoamericano
- El llanto (1992). Beatriz Viterbo
- El volante (1992). Beatriz Viterbo
- Diario de la hepatitis (1993). Bajo la luna nueva
- Madre e hijo (1993). Bajo la luna Nueva
- Cómo me hice monja (1993). Beatriz Viterbo
- La costurera y el viento (1994). Beatriz Viterbo
- Los misterios de Rosario (1994). Emecé
- La fuente (1995). Beatriz Viterbo
- Los dos payasos (1995). Beatriz Viterbo
- La abeja (1996). Emecé
- El mensajero (1996). Beatriz Viterbo
- Dante y Reina (1997). Mate
- El congreso de literatura (1997).
- La serpiente (1998). Beatriz Viterbo
- El sueño (1998). Emecé
- Las curas milagrosas del Dr. Aira (1998). Simurg
- La mendiga (1998). Mondadori
- Un episodio en la vida del pintor viajero (2000). Beatriz Viterbo
- El juego de los mundos (2000). El Broche
- Un sueño realizado (2001). Alfaguara
- La villa (2001). Emecé
- El mago (2002). Mondadori
- Varamo (2002). Anagrama
- Fragmentos de un diario en los Alpes (2002). Beatriz Viterbo
- La princesa Primavera (2003). Era
- El tilo (2003). Beatriz Viterbo
- Las noches de Flores (2004). Mondadori
- Yo era una chica moderna (2004). Interzona
- Yo era una niña de siete años (2005). Interzona
- Cómo me reí (2005). Beatriz Viterbo
- Haikus (2005). Mate
- El pequeño monje budista (2005). Mansalva
- Parménides (2006). Alfaguara
- La cena (2006). Beatriz Viterbo
- Las conversaciones (2007). Beatriz Viterbo
- La vida nueva (2007). Mansalva
- Las aventuras de Barbaverde (2008). Mondadori
- La confesión (2009). Beatriz Viterbo
- El error (2010). Mondadori
- El divorcio (2010). Mansalva
- Yo era una mujer casada (2010). Blatt & Ríos
- Festival (2011). BAFICI
- El marmol (2011). La Bestia Equilátera
- El náufrago (2011). Beatriz Viterbo
- Cecil Taylor (2011). Mansalva
- Los dos hombres (2011). Urania
- Entre los indios (2012). Mansalva
- El testamento del Mago Tenor (2013). Emecé
- Margarita (un recuerdo) (2013). Mansalva
- El Ilustre Mago (2013). Ediciones Biblioteca Nacional
- Artforum (2014). Blatt & Ríos
- Actos de caridad (2014). Hueders
- Biografía (2014). Mansalva, Buenos Aires
- Triano (2015). Milena Caserola, Buenos Aires
- La invención del tren fantasma (2015). Mansalva, Buenos Aires
- El Santo (2015). Mondadori/Literatura Random House, Buenos Aires
- Una aventura (2017). Editorial Mansalva, Buenos Aires
- Eterna Juventud (2017). Hueders, Santiago de Chile
- Saltó al otro lado (2017). Ediciones Urania, Buenos Aires
- El gran misterio (2018). Blatt & Ríos, Buenos Aires
- Un filósofo (2018). Iván Rosado, Rosario
- Prins (2018). Random House, Buenos Aires
- El presidente (2019). Mansalva, Buenos Aires
- Pinceladas musicales (2019). Blatt & Ríos, Buenos Aires
- Fulgentius (2020). Literatura Random House, Barcelona
- Lugones (2020). Blatt & Ríos, Buenos Aires
- Kómodo (2021). Ediciones Kalos, Buenos Aires
- El jardinero, el escultor y el fugitivo (2022). Literatura Random House, Buenos Aires.
- El panadero (2022)
- Los últimos días de Nostradamus (2022)
- En el pensamiento (2024)

=== Pamphlets and standalone short stories ===
- El infinito (1994). Vanagloria Ediciones
- La pastilla de hormona (2002). Belleza y Felicidad
- Mil gotas (2003). Eloísa Cartonera
- El cerebro musical (2005). Eloísa Cartonera
- El todo que surca la nada (2006). Eloísa Cartonera
- Picasso (2007). Belleza y Felicidad
- El perro (2010). Belleza y Felicidad
- El criminal y el dibujante (2010). Spiral Jetty
- El té de Dios (2010). Mata-Mata
- La Revista Atenea (2011). Sazón Ediciones Latinoamericanas
- El hornero (2011). Sazón Ediciones Latinoamericanas
- En el café (2011). Belleza y Felicidad
- A brick wall (2012). Del Centro

=== Stories originally published in magazines ===
- "El sultán" (1991) in Paradoxa magazine, Vol. 6, No. 6, pp. 27–29.
- "El hornero" (1994/1995) in Muela de Juicio magazine, Vol. 9, No. 5, pp. 2–4.
- "Pobreza" (1996) in Muela de Juicio magazine, Vol. 11, No. 6, pp. 2–3.
- "Los osos topiarios del Parque Arauco" in Paula magazine.
- "El té de Dios" (2011) in the Mexican edition of Playboy magazine.

=== Short story collections ===
- La trompeta de mimbre (1998). Beatriz Viterbo
- Tres historias pringlenses (2013). Ediciones Biblioteca Nacional
- Relatos reunidos (2013). Mondadori
- El cerebro musical (2016). Literatura Random House

=== Essays and non-fiction ===
- Copi (1991). Beatriz Viterbo
- Nouvelles Impressions du Petit-Maroc (1991). Meet (French/Spanish bilingual)
- Taxol: precedido de 'Duchamp en México' y 'La broma' (1997). Simurg
- "La nueva escritura", La Jornada Semanal, Ciudad de México, 12 April 1998 (an English translation The New Writing, published in The White Review, July 2013)
- Alejandra Pizarnik (1998). Beatriz Viterbo
- Cumpleaños (2000, 2001). Mondadori – Autobiographical essay
- Diccionario de autores latinoamericanos (2001). Emecé
- Alejandra Pizarnik (2001). Ediciones Omega
- Las tres fechas (2001). Beatriz Viterbo
- Edward Lear (2004). Beatriz Viterbo
- Pequeno manual de procedimentos (2007). Arte & Letra
- Continuación de ideas diversas (2014). Ediciones Universidad Diego Portales
- Sobre el arte contemporáneo seguido de En La Habana (2016). Literatura Random House
- Cuatro Ensayos (2020). Beatriz Viterbo – including Aira's essay "Las tres fechas" and his essays on Alejandra Pizarnik, Edward Lear, and Copi.
- Una educación defectuosa: Discurso de recepción del Premio Formentor (2022). Urania

=== Works in English translation ===
- The Hare (trans. Nick Caistor; 1997) ISBN 978-1-85242-291-2 (Serpent's Tail)
- An Episode in the Life of a Landscape Painter (trans. Chris Andrews; 2006) ISBN 978-0-8112-1630-2 (New Directions)
- How I Became a Nun (trans. Chris Andrews; 2007) ISBN 978-0-8112-1631-9 (New Directions)
- Ghosts (trans. Chris Andrews; 2009) ISBN 978-0-8112-1742-2 (New Directions)
- The Literary Conference (trans. Katherine Silver; 2010) ISBN 978-0-8112-1878-8 (New Directions)
- The Seamstress and the Wind (trans. Rosalie Knecht; 2011) ISBN 978-0-8112-1912-9 (New Directions)
- The Musical Brain (trans. Chris Andrews; 5 December 2011) in The New Yorker magazine
- Varamo (trans. Chris Andrews; 2012) ISBN 978-0-8112-1741-5 (New Directions)
- The Miracle Cures of Dr. Aira (trans. Katherine Silver; October 2012) ISBN 978-0-8112-1999-0 (New Directions)
- The Hare (trans. Nick Caistor; June 2013) ISBN 978-0811220903 (New Directions)
- Shantytown (trans. Chris Andrews; November 2013) ISBN 978-0811219112 (New Directions)
- The Conversations (trans. Katherine Silver; June 2014) ISBN 978-0811221108 (New Directions)
- Picasso (trans. Chris Andrews; 11 August 2014) in The New Yorker magazine
- Cecil Taylor (trans. Chris Andrews; 13 February 2015) in BOMB magazine
- The Musical Brain: And Other Stories (trans. Chris Andrews; March 2015) ISBN 978-0811220293 (New Directions)
- Dinner (trans. Katherine Silver; October 2015) ISBN 978-0811221085 (New Directions)
- Ema the Captive (trans. Chris Andrews; 6 December 2016) ISBN 978-0811219105 (New Directions)
- The Little Buddhist Monk and The Proof (trans. Nick Caistor) ISBN 978-0811221122, New Directions, US (2017)
- The Little Buddhist Monk (trans. Nick Caistor) ISBN 978-1908276988, And Other Stories, UK, (2017)
- The Proof (trans. Nick Caistor) ISBN 9781908276964, And Other Stories, UK (2017)
- The Linden Tree (trans. Chris Andrews) ISBN 978-0811219082, New Directions, US (2018); As The Lime Tree ISBN 9781911508120, And Other Stories, UK (2018)
- On Contemporary Art (trans. Katherine Silver) ISBN 978-1941701867, David Zwirner Books, US (2018)
- Birthday (trans. Chris Andrews) ISBN ISBN 978-0811219099, New Directions, US (2019); ISBN 978-1911508403, And Other Stories, UK (2019)
- Artforum (trans. Katherine Silver) ISBN 978-0811229265, New Directions, US (2020)
- The Divorce (trans. Chris Andrews) ISBN 978-0811219099, New Directions, US (2021)
- The Famous Magician (trans. Chris Andrews) ISBN 978-0811228893, New Directions, US (2022)
- Fulgentius (trans. Chris Andrews) ISBN 978-0811231695, New Directions, US (2023)
- Festival & Game of the Worlds (trans. Katherine Silver) ISBN 978-0811237307, New Directions, US (2024)

=== Studies of Aira's work ===
- Alfieri, Carlos, Conversaciones: Entrevistas a César Aira, Guillermo Cabrera Infante, Roger Chartier, Antonio Muñoz Molina, Ricardo Piglia y Fernando Savater (Buenos Aires: katz Editores, 2008), 199 pp.
- Arambasin, Nella (ed.), Aira en réseau: Rencontre transdisciplinaire autour du roman de l’écrivain argentin César Aira Un episodio en la vida del pintor viajero / Un épisode dans la vie du peintre voyageur (Besançon: Presses universitaires de Franche-Comté, 2005), 151 pp.
- Capano, Daniel A., "La voz de la nueva novela histórica: La estética de la clonación y de la aporía en La liebre de César Aira," in Domínguez, Mignon (ed.), Historia, ficción y metaficción en la novela latinoamericana contemporánea (Buenos Aires: Corregidor, 1996), pp. 91–119.
- Contreras, Sandra, Las vueltas de César Aira (Rosario: Beatríz Viterbo Editora, 2002), 320 pp.
- Decock, Pablo, "El transrealismo en la narrativa de César Aira," in Fabry, Geneviève, and Claudio Canaparo (eds.), El enigma de lo real: Las fronteras del realismo en la narrativa del siglo XX (Oxford and Bern: Lang, 2007), pp. 157–168.
- Decock, Pablo, Las figuras paradojicas de Cesar Aira: Un estudio semiótico y axiológico de la estereotipia y la autofiguración (Bern: Peter Lang, 2014), 344 pp.
- Estrin, Laura, César Aira: El realismo y sus extremos (Buenos Aires: Ediciones Del Valle, 1999), 79 pp.
- Fernández, Nancy, Narraciones viajeras: César Aira y Juan José Saer (Buenos Aires: Editorial Biblos, 2000), 190 pp.
- García, Mariano, Degeneraciones textuales: Los géneros en la obra de César Aira (Rosario: Beatríz Viterbo Editora / Consorcio de Editores, 2006), 320 pp.
- Klinger, Diana Irene, Escritas de si, escritas do outro: O retorno do autor e a virada etnográfica: Bernardo Carvalho, Fernando Vallejo, Washington Cucurto, João Gilberto Noll, César Aira, Silviano Santigo (Rio de Janeiro: 7Letras, 2007), 187 pp.
- Lafon, Michel, Cristina Breuil, Margarita Remón-Raillard, and Julio Premat (eds.), César Aira, Une Révolution (Grenoble: Université Stendhal – Grenoble 3, Tigre, 2005), 311 pp.
- Mattoni, Silvio, "César Aira," in Arán, Pampa (et al.) (eds.), Umbrales y catástrofes: Literatura argentina de los '90 (Argentina: Epoké, 2003), 258 pp.
- Peñate Rivero, Julio, "¿Una poética del viaje en la narrativa de César Aira?" in Peñate Rivero, Julio (ed.), Relato de viaje y literaturas hispánicas [Papers from an international colloquium organized by the University of Fribourg, May 2004] (Madrid: Visor Libros, 2004), pp. 333–351.
- Pitol, Sergio, and Teresa García Díaz (eds.), César Aira en miniatura: Un acercamiento crítico (Xalpa, Veracruz: Instituto de Investigaciones Lingüístico-Literarias, Universidad Veracruzana, 2006), 188 pp.
- Scramim, Susana, Literatura do presente: História e anacronismo dos textos (Chapecó: Argos Editora Universitária, 2007), 190 pp.
- Strafacce, Ricardo, César Aira, un catálogo (Buenos Aires: Mansalva, 2014), 264 pp.

== Sources ==
- "The Literary Alchemy of Cesar Aira Archived 16 June 2008 at the Wayback Machine". The Quarterly Conversation. January 2007. Sitemeter.
- Galchen, Rivka. 2011. "Into the unforeseen: A romance of César Aira" Harper's Magazine June 2011, pp. 54–63.
