= List of Argentine women writers =

This is a list of women writers who were born in Argentina or whose writings are closely associated with this country.

== A ==
- Florencia Abbate (born 1976), novelist, poet, essayist, short story writer, journalist
- Margarita Abella Caprile (1901–1960), poet, novelist, short story writer, travel writer, journalist
- Marcelina Almeida (ca. 1830–1880), writer
- Agustina Andrade (1858–1891), poet
- Judith Astelarra (born 1943), sociologist specializing in gender studies
- Elizabeth Azcona Cranwell (1933–2004), surrealist poet, short story writer, critic, translator

== B ==
- Ana Baron (1950–2015), writer, journalist
- Odile Baron Supervielle (1915–2016), writer, journalist
- Emma de la Barra (1861–1947), best selling novelist
- Emma Barrandeguy (1914–2006), poet, novelist, journalist, translator
- Diana Bellessi (born 1946), poet, essayist
- Juana Bignozzi (1937–2015), translator, journalist, poet
- Poldy Bird (1941–2018), poet, essayist, columnist
- Liliana Bodoc (1958–2018), novelist
- Ivonne Bordelois (born 1934), poet, essayist, linguist
- Alicia Borinsky, (fl. since 1975), novelist, poet, critic
- Norah Borges (1901–1998), artist, illustrator, poet, journalist
- Elsa Bornemann (1952–2013), children's writer
- Herminia Brumana (1897–1954), novelist, playwright, journalist
- Silvina Bullrich (1915–1990), best selling novelist, translator, screenwriter, critic
- Delfina Bunge (1881–1952), poet, short story writer, essayist

== C ==
- Susana Calandrelli (1901–1978), poet, novelist, short story writer, essayist, textbook writer
- Estela Canto (1919–1994), novelist, biographer, journalist, translator
- María Luisa Carnelli (1898–1987), poet, journalist
- Albertina Carri (born 1973), actress, screenwriter, film director
- Nené Cascallar (1914–1982), playwright for radio and television, screenwriter
- Estela Beatriz Cols (1965–2010), pedagogue, researcher, educator, non-fiction writer
- Flavia Company (born 1963), novelist, poet
- Celia Correas de Zapata (1933–2022), poet, non-fiction writer, historian, educator
- Maria Sonia Cristoff (born 1965), novelist, short story writer, non-fiction writer
- Emilce Cuda (born 1965), Catholic theologian, professor and writer
- María Guadalupe Cuenca (1790–1854), letter writer
- Maria Renee Cura (died 2007), indologist, non-fiction writer

== D ==
- Emma de Cartosio (1928–2013), writer, poet, storyteller, essayist
- Mercedes Dantas Lacombe (1888–1966), poet, teacher
- Juana Dib (1924–2015), poet, journalist, teacher
- Adelia Di Carlo (1883–1965) writer, chronicler, founder
- Beatriz Doumerc (1929–2014), children's literature writer
- Alicia Dujovne Ortiz (born 1940), poet, columnist, short story writer, biographer

== E ==
- Ada María Elflein (1880–1919), poet, columnist, translator, teacher
- Mariana Enríquez (born 1973), journalist, novelist, short story writer

== F ==
- Paloma Fabrykant (born 1981), artist, journalist, non-fiction writer, mixed martial arts expert
- Manuela Fingueret (1945–2013), poet, novelist, journalist, essayist
- Luisa Futoransky (born 1939), poet, novelist, journalist, scholar

== G ==
- Sara Gallardo (1931–1988), novelist, short story writer
- Griselda Gambaro (born 1928), novelist, playwright, short story writer, essayist, young adult writer
- Fernanda García Lao (born 1966), novelist, poet, short story writer.
- Carlota Garrido de la Peña (1870–1958), journalist, writer, teacher
- Alicia Ghiragossian (1936–2014), poet
- Betina Gonzalez (born 1972), novelist, short story writer
- Clotilde González de Fernández (1880–1935), non-fiction writer, educator
- Viviana Gorbato (1950–2005), journalist, writer, professor
- Angélica Gorodischer (1928–2022), short story writer, novelist
- Juana Manuela Gorriti (1818–1892), novelist, short story writer, politician
- Rosa Guerra (1834–1864), educator, journalist, writer
- Beatriz Guido (1924–1988), novelist, screenwriter
- Golde Gutman-Krimer (1906–1984), Yiddish writer

== H ==
- Liliana Heker (born 1943), short story writer, novelist, essayist

== I ==
- Marcela Iacub (born 1964), French-language novelist, essayist
- Sylvia Iparraguirre (born 1947), novelist, human rights activist
- Blanca Irurzun (1910–1999), poet

== J ==
- Alicia Jurado (1922–2011), writer and academic

== K ==
- Nelly Kaplan (1931–2020), French-language novelist, essayist, script writer
- Bertha Koessler-Ilg (1881–1965), German-born Argentine folklorist
- Natalia Kohen (1919–2022), artist and writer
- Alicia Kozameh (born 1953), novelist, short story writer, poet

== L ==
- María Hortensia Lacau (1910–2006), pedagogue, writer, essayist, poet, educator
- Ana Emilia Lahitte (1921–2013), poet, playwright, essayist, journalist
- Norah Lange (1905–1972), poet, novelist, autobiographer
- María Rosa Lida de Malkiel (1910–1962), philologist, non-fiction writer
- Natalia Litvinova (born 1986) writer, editor, poet, translator
- Belén López Peiró (born 1992), writer and columnist
- Marta Lynch (1925–1985), novelist, short story writer
- Pilar de Lusarreta (1914–1967), journalist, short story writer, essayist, critic

== M ==
- Eduarda Mansilla (1834–1892), novelist, playwright, essayist, music critic, composer
- Daisy May Queen (born 1965), radio and television presenter, writer
- Rosita Melo (1897–1981), pianist, composer, songwriter, poet
- Gaby Melian (born 1969/1970), chef, cookbook writer
- Martha Mercader (1926–2010), politician, novelist, short story writer, essayist, children's writer
- Tununa Mercado (born 1939), novelist, short story writer, essayist
- Liliana Díaz Mindurry (born 1953), poet, novelist, short story writer
- Delfina Molina y Vedia (1879–1961), memoirist, poet and academic writer
- Adela Montes (1928–2024), journalist
- Graciela Montes (born 1947), children's writer, translator
- Ana Gloria Moya (1954–2013), novelist
- Cristina Mucci (born 1949), writer, journalist
- Carolina Muzzilli (1889–1917), industrial researcher, social activist, non-fiction writer

== N ==
- María Negroni (born 1951), poet, essayist, novelist, translator

== O ==
- Clara Obligado (born 1950), novelist, short story writer
- Silvina Ocampo (1903–1993), poet, short story writer, playwright
- Victoria Ocampo (1890–1979), magazine publisher, critic, journalist, essayist, autobiographer, translator
- María Rosa Oliver (1898–1977), short story writer, essayist, critic, translator
- Olga Orozco (1920–1999), poet, journalist
- Elvira Orphée (1922–2018), novelist, short story writer

== P ==
- Agustina Palacio de Libarona (1825–1880), non-fiction writer, storyteller, heroine
- Alicia Partnoy (born 1955), poet, translator, human rights activist
- Josefina Passadori (1900–1987), writer, educator
- Clara Passafari (1930–1994), anthropologist, non-fiction writer, poet
- Iris Pavón (1906–1951) poet and writer
- Luisa Peluffo (born 1941), journalist, poet, novelist
- Alejandra Pizarnik (1936–1972), poet, journalist
- Lucía Puenzo (born 1976), novelist, film director
- Adriana Puiggrós (born 1941), non-fiction writer, politician, educator

== R ==
- Patricia Ratto (born 1962), writer, teacher
- Viviana Rivero (born 1966), writer
- Petrona Rosende (1797–1893), poet, journalist

== S ==
- María Sáez de Vernet (1800–1858), chronicler of Argentine settlement of the Falkland Islands
- Matilde Sánchez (born 1958), journalist, writer, and translator
- Beatriz Sarlo (1942–2024), critic, journal editor, non-fiction writer
- Samanta Schweblin (born 1978), novelist, short story writer
- Susy Shock (born 1968), actress, writer, singer
- Ana María Shua (born 1951), novelist, short story writer, poet, essayist, playwright, children's writer
- Sara Solá de Castellanos (1890–?), poet, novelist, playwright, lyricist
- Alicia Steimberg (1933–2012), novelist, short story writer, translator
- Alfonsina Storni (1892–1938), poet, playwright
- Matilde Alba Swann (1912–2000), poet, journalist, lawyer

== T ==
- María Dhialma Tiberti (1928–1987), novelist, poet
- Marta Traba (1923–1983), art critic, novelist
- Raymunda Torres y Quiroga (?-?), 19th-century writer and women's rights activist

== U ==
- Hebe Uhart (1936–2018), novelist, short story writer

== V ==
- Luisa Valenzuela (born 1938), novelist, short story writer, essayist
- Aurora Venturini (1922–2015), novelist, short story writer, poet, essayist, translator
- Esther Vilar (born 1935), German-language non-fiction writer, playwright
- Paulina Vinderman (born 1944), poet, translator

== W ==
- Paula Wajsman (1939–1995), psychologist, poet, translator, researcher
- María Elena Walsh (1930–2011), children's writer, poet, novelist, playwright, musician
- Susana, Lady Walton (1926–1983), non-fiction writer in English
- Ema Wolf (born 1948), writer, journalist

== Y ==
- Laura Yasán (1960–2021), poet

== See also ==
- List of Argentine writers
- List of women writers
- List of Spanish-language authors
