= List of Argentine writers =

This is a list of Argentine literary figures, including poets, novelists, children's writers, essayists, and scholars.

== A ==
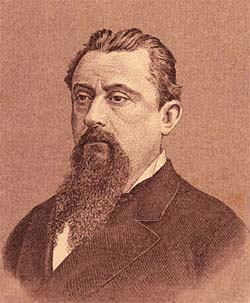
Olegario Victor Andrade

- Diego Abad de Santillán (1897–1983)
- Marcos Aguinis (born 1935)
- César Aira (born 1949)
- Andrés J. d'Alessio (1940–2009)
- Leonor Allende (1883-1931)
- Marcelina Almeida (ca. 1830-1880)
- Juan Álvarez (1878–1954)
- Mario Amadeo (1911–1983)
- Federico Andahazi (born 1963)
- Eduardo Angeloz (1931-2017)
- José Arce (1881–1968)
- Juan Argerich (1862–1924)
- Roberto Arlt (1900–1942)
- Hilario Ascasubi (1807–1875)
- Carlos Astrada (1894–1970)

== B ==
- Odile Baron Supervielle (1915-2016)
- Ángel Bonomini (1929-1994)
- Eduardo Belgrano Rawson (born 1943)
- Eduardo Berti (born 1964)
- Héctor Bianciotti (1930–2012)
- Adolfo Bioy Casares (1914–1999)
- Poldy Bird (1941-2018)
- Marcelo Birmajer (born 1966)
- Isidoro Blaisten (1933–2004)
- Elsa Bornemann (1952–2013)
- Jorge Luis Borges (1899–1986)
- Miguel Brascó (1926–2014)
- Edgar Brau (born 1958)
- Esteban Lucas Bridges (1874–1949)
- Delfina Bunge (1881–1952)

== C ==
- Facundo Cabral (1937–2011)
- Susana Calandrelli (1901–1978)
- Pilar Calveiro (born 1953)
- Eugenio Cambaceres (1834–1880)
- Estanislao del Campo (1834–1880)
- José María del Campo (1826–1884)
- Martín Caparrós (born 1957)
- Ramón J. Cárcano (1860–1946)
- Andrés Manuel Carretero (1927-2004)
- Evaristo Carriego (1883–1912)
- Leonardo Castellani (1889–1981)
- Abelardo Castillo (1935-2017)
- Nelson Castro (born 1955)
- Haroldo Conti (born 1925, disappeared 1976)
- Copi (1939–1987)
- Julio Cortázar (1914–1984)
- Roberto Cossa (1934–2024)
- Agustín Cuzzani (1924–1987)

== D ==
- Emma de Cartosio (1928–2013)
- Marco Denevi (1922–1998)
- Juana Dib (1924-2015)
- Antonio Di Benedetto (1922–1986)
- Adelia Di Carlo (1883-1965)
- Maria Alicia Dominguez, (1904–1988)
- Beatriz Doumerc (1929-2014)
- Osvaldo Dragún (1929–1999)
- Alicia Dujovne Ortiz (born 1940)
- León Dujovne (1898-1984)

== E ==
- Esteban Echeverría (1805–1851)
- José Ricardo Eliaschev (1945–2014)

== F ==
- Sara Facio (1932–2024)
- María Inés Falconi (born 1954)
- José Pablo Feinmann (1943–2021)
- Macedonio Fernández (1874–1952)
- Juan Filloy (1894–2000)
- Fogwill (1941–2010)
- Roberto Fontanarrosa (1944–2007)
- Juan Forn (1959–2021)
- Rodrigo Fresán (born 1963)
- Rogelio Julio Frigerio (1914–2006)

== G ==
- Manuel Gálvez (1882–1962)
- Griselda Gambaro (born 1928)
- Juan Gelman (1930–2014)
- Jordán Bruno Genta (1909–1974)
- Alberto Gerchunoff (1883–1949)
- Oliverio Girondo (1891–1967)
- Betina Gonzalez (born 1972)
- Clotilde González de Fernández (1880-1935)
- Angélica Gorodischer (1928–2022)
- Juana Manuela Gorriti (1818–1892)
- Andrew Graham-Yooll (1944-2019)
- Alberto Granado (1922–2011)
- Paul Groussac (1848–1929)
- Eduardo Gudiño Kieffer (1935–2002)
- Che Guevara (1928–1967)
- Ricardo Güiraldes (1886–1927)
- Eduardo Gutiérrez (1851–1889)
- Juan María Gutiérrez (1809–1878)

== H ==
- José Ignacio García Hamilton (1943–2009)
- Iosi Havilio (born 1974)
- Liliana Heker (born 1943)
- José Rafael Hernández y Pueyrredón (1834–1886)
- José Hernández (1834–1886)
- Miguel Hesayne (1922–2019)
- Eduardo Ladislao Holmberg (1852–1937)
- Mirta Hortas (1949–2022)
- Guillermo Enrique Hudson (1841–1922)

== I ==
- Carlos Ibarguren (1877–1956)
- José Ingenieros (1877–1925)
- Sylvia Iparraguirre (born 1947)
- Julio Irazusta (1899–1982)

== J ==
- Arturo Jauretche (1901–1974)
- Noé Jitrik (1928–2022)
- Alicia Jurado (1922-2011)

== K ==
- Paola Kaufmann (1969–2006)
- Joseph Kessel (1898-1979)
- Alicia Kozameh (born 1953)

== L ==
- María Hortensia Lacau (1910-2006), Argentine pedagogue, writer, essayist, poet, educator
- Leónidas Lamborghini (1927–2009)
- Osvaldo Lamborghini (1940–1985)
- Jorge Lanata (born 1960)
- Héctor Libertella (1945–2006)
- Gloria Lisé (born 1961)
- Leopoldo Lugones (1874–1938)
- Benito Lynch (1885–1951)

== M ==
- Tomás Maldonado (1922-2018)
- Eduardo Mallea (1903–1982)
- Francis Mallmann (born 1956)
- Leopoldo Marechal (1900–1970)
- José Mármol (1818–1871)
- Guillermo Martínez (born 1962)
- Tomás Eloy Martínez (1934–2010)
- Ezequiel Martínez Estrada (1895–1964)
- Carlos Mastronardi (1901–1976)
- Gaby Melian (born 1969/1970)
- Hugo Midón (1944–2011)
- Emilio F. Mignone (1922–1998)
- Bartolomé Mitre (1821–1906)
- Fray Mocho (José Seferino Álvarez) (1858–1903)
- Delfina Molina y Vedia (1879–1961)
- Graciela Montes (born 1947)
- Eduardo Montes-Bradley (born 1960)
- Manuel Mujica Láinez (1910–1984)
- H. A. Murena (1923–1975)

== N ==
- José Narosky (born 1930)
- Andrés Neuman (born 1977)
- Gustavo Nielsen (born 1962)

== O ==
- Rafael Obligado (1851–1920)
- Luis Moreno Ocampo (born 1952)
- Silvina Ocampo (1903–1993)
- Victoria Ocampo (1890–1979)
- Héctor Germán Oesterheld (born 1919; disappeared and presumed dead 1977)
- Sergio Olguín (born 1967)
- Andrés Oppenheimer (born 1951)
- Olga Orozco (1920–1999)
- Elvira Orphée (1922-2018)
- Juan L. Ortiz (1896–1978)

== P ==
- Adrián Paenza (born 1949)
- Alicia Partnoy (born 1955)
- Josefina Passadori (1900-1987)
- Roberto Payró (1867-1928)
- José María Paz (1791-1854)
- Luisa Peluffo (born 1941)
- Néstor Perlongher (1949–1992)
- Ricardo Piglia (1941-2017)
- Felipe Pigna (born 1959)
- Claudia Piñeiro (born 1960)
- Alejandra Pizarnik (1936-1972)
- Antonio Porchia (1885–1968)
- Juan Carlos Portantiero (1934-2007)
- Abel Posse (1934–2023)
- Manuel Puig (1932-1990)
- Adriana Puiggrós (born 1941)

== R ==
- Rodolfo Rabanal (1940–2020)
- María Cristina Ramos (born 1952)
- Patricia Ratto (born 1962)
- Silvina Reinaudi (born 1942)
- Andrés Rivera (1928-2016)
- Jorge B. Rivera (1935–2004)
- Mario Rodríguez Cobos (1938–2010)
- Reina Roffé (born 1951)
- Arturo Andrés Roig (1922–2012)
- Ricardo Rojas (1882–1957)
- Viviana Rivero (born 1966)

== S ==
- Ernesto Sábato (1911-2011)
- Guillermo Saccomanno (born 1948)
- Carlos Alberto Sacheri (1933-1974)
- Eduardo Sacheri (born 1967)
- Juan José Saer (1937-2005)
- Beatriz Sarlo (1942–2024)
- Domingo Faustino Sarmiento (1811-1888)
- Juan José Sebreli (1930–2024)
- Ana María Shua (born 1951)
- Silo (pen name of Mario Rodríguez Cobos) (1938-2010)
- Osvaldo Soriano (1943-1997)
- Alicia Steimberg (1933-2012)
- Alfonsina Storni (1892-1938)
- Víctor Sueiro (1943-2007)

== T ==
- Jacobo Timerman (1923-1999)
- Héctor Tizón (1929-2012)
- Raymunda Torres y Quiroga (?-?), 19th-century Argentine writer and women's rights activist

== U ==
- Paco Urondo (1930–1976)

== V ==
- Luisa Valenzuela (born 1938)
- Horacio Verbitsky (born 1942)
- Eliseo Verón (1935–2014)
- David Viñas (1927–2011)

== W ==
- María Elena Walsh (1930–2011)
- Rodolfo Walsh (1927–1977)
- Juan Rodolfo Wilcock (1919–1978)

== Y ==
- Pablo Yoiris (born 1972)

== Z ==
- Raúl Zaffaroni (born 1940)

== See also ==
- List of Argentine women writers
- Argentine literature
- List of Argentines
- List of Latin American writers
