= Celia Correas de Zapata =

Argentine academic, poet, and author (1933–2022)

Celia Correas de Zapata (9 October 1933 – 21 August 2022) was an Argentine academic, poet, and author, and a leading scholar of the history of Latin American women writers. She was a professor of literature at San Jose State University, and was director of the 1976 Conference of Inter-American Women Writers, one of the earliest U.S. conferences in this field.

Correas de Zapata was born in Mendoza, Argentina on 9 October 1933. She edited the anthology Short Stories by Latin America Women: The Magic and the Real with an introduction by Isabel Allende. Correas de Zapata latterly resided in Clovis, California, where she died on 21 August 2022, at the age of 88.

== See also ==
- List of Argentine writers
