= Juana Bignozzi =

Argentinian translator, journalist and poet

- Born: September 21, 1937; Buenos Aires, Argentina
- Died: 5 August 2015 (aged 77); Buenos Aires, Argentina
- Occupations: Translator, journalist, poet
- Awards: Konex Award (2004)

Juana Bignozzi (1937 – 5 August 2015) was an Argentine translator, journalist, and poet. She was a recipient of the 2000 Municipal Poetry Prize, the 2004 Konex Award, and the 2013 Rosa de Cobre Prize.

== Biography ==
Juana Bignozzi was born in 1937 to an anarchist and anti-Peronist family. Though growing up with economic limitations, she always had privileged access to culture and education over other expenses, which Bignozzi greatly appreciated.

In the late 1950s, Bignozzi became a militant in the Communist Party, and from there became involved with the poets' circle El Pan Duro, where she met Juan Gelman, Juan Carlos Portantiero, and José Luis Mangieri. In the 1960s she left the Communist Party although she worked on the publication Vanguardia Comunista. She began and abandoned careers in Arts and Law at the University of Buenos Aires. She worked as an accounting professor, accountant, and administrative assistant.

In 1974, she married Hugo Mariani and moved to Barcelona, before the beginning of the National Reorganization Process. She left thinking that she would return in a few years, and for that reason she did not accept the word exiliada (exiled) but accepted the words desterrada, apátrida (exiled, stateless). She spent 30 years of her life in Spain, working as a translator and traveling frequently to Florence.

About poetry, Bignozzi said:

I want what I say to be understood, but not necessarily easy to understand [...] You are a poet to work with the language in another way. In poetry there must be some mystery, something that the poet sees and that the public does not. We have an obligation to reveal the mysteries but in a different way than journalism has.

Bignozzi returned to Argentina in 2004, where she died in 2015 at age 78. She left her work to the young journalist and poet Mercedes Halfon, who with the help of the director Laura Citarella created a movie recreating her life and memory, Las poetas visitan a Juana Bignozzi, which won the 2019 Best Director award at the Mar del Plata International Film Festival.

== Awards ==
She was awarded the 2000 Municipal Poetry Prize, the 2004 Konex Award, and the 2013 Rosa de Cobre Prize from the National Library of Argentina.

== Books ==
- 1960: Los límites
- 1962: Tierra de nadie
- 1989: Regreso a la patria
- 1990: Mujer de cierto orden
- 1993: Interior con poeta
- 1997: Partida de las grande líneas
- 2000: La ley tu ley
- 2010: Si alguien tiene que ser después
