= Herminia Brumana =

Argentine teacher, writer, journalist, playwright and feminist activist

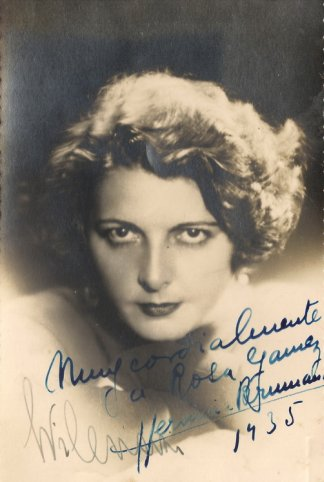
- Born: Herminia Catalina Brumana; September 12, 1897; Pigüé, Argentina
- Died: January 9, 1954 (aged 56); Buenos Aires, Argentina
- Other names: La Maestra Ciruela; Pesao Grúa; Zúlex
- Employers: José Manuel Estrada Normal School; Mundo Argentino; El Hogar; La Nación
- Organization: Argentine Writers Society
- Spouse: Juan Antonio Solari

Herminia Catalina Brumana (12 September 1897 in Pigüé – 9 January 1954 in Buenos Aires) was an Argentine teacher, writer, journalist, playwright and feminist activist with socialist and anarchist ideas.

== Early life ==
Brumana was born on 12 September 1897 in Pigüé to an Italian Argentine family.

== Career ==
=== Teaching ===
Brumana trained to become a teacher at the José Manuel Estrada Normal School in Olavarría. Her first job was teaching the fifth grade at School No. 3 in Pigüé, between 1917 and 1921. She then taught in Quilmes and at numerous schools in the Avellaneda district.

=== Activism ===
Brumana was an anarchist, socialist and public intellectual. As an anarchist, Brumana called feminists "bourgeois" and objected to women's political rights on the grounds that politics would compromise femininity. She claimed to support strong and capable women but spurned "feminists" and considered it an ideology that promoted a "masculinisation" of women. She argued that instead of looking for political influence in a ballot, women should focus on moulding the next generations of male policymakers in their homes. She later began to question the stereotyped images of women and hegemonic representations of gender.

=== Writing ===
Brumana wrote nine books and eleven plays, three of them published. She wrote for Mundo Argentino, El Hogar and La Nación, among other periodicals. Her pseudonyms included La Maestra Ciruela, Pesao Grúa and Zúlex.

Brumana was also a member of the Argentine Writers Society.

== Death and legacy ==
Brumana died in Buenos Aires in 1954.

The Herminia Brumana Primary School Nº56 in La Matanza is named in her honour.

== Selected works ==
=== Prose ===
- Palabritas, 1918.
- Cabezas de mujeres, 1923
- Mosaico, 1929
- La grúa, 1931
- Tizas de colores, 1932
- Cartas a las mujeres argentinas, 1936
- Nuestro Hombre, 1939
- Me llamo niebla, 1946
- A Buenos Aires le falta una calle, 1953

=== Theatre ===
- La protagonista olvidada, 1933

== See also ==
- List of Argentine writers

== Bibliography ==
- Bellucci, Mabel (1994). Anarquismo y feminismo. El movimiento de mujeres anarquistas con sus logros y desafíos hacia principios de siglo. Todo es Historia abril (321): pp. 66–67.
- Fletcher, Lea (1987). Una mujer llamada Herminia. Buenos Aires: Catálogos Editora.
- Paniza, Delio (1954). Semblanza de Herminia Brumana. Buenos Aires: Montiel.
- Rodríguez Tarditi, José (1956). Herminia Brumana, escritora y maestra. Buenos Aires.
- Sámatan, Marta Elena (1974). Herminia Brumana, la rebelde. Buenos Aires: Plus Ultra.
- Szlaska de Dujovich, Raquel (1987). Herminia C. Brumana en su proyección docente e intellectual. Buenos Aires: De la autora.
- Wapnir, Salomón (1964). Perfil y obra de Herminia Brumana. Buenos Aires: Perlado.
