= Paula Wajsman =

Argentine psychologist, writer, translator and researcher

- Born: 26 August 1939; San Juan, Argentina
- Died: 1995 (aged 55–56); Buenos Aires, Argentina
- Education: University of Buenos Aires
- Occupations: Psychologist, poet, translator, researcher

Paula Wajsman (26 August 1939 – 1995) was an Argentine psychologist, writer, translator, and researcher.

== Biography ==
Paula Wajsman was the youngest daughter of a Polish immigrant family. At 4 years of age, after the San Juan earthquake (15 January 1944), her family decided to move from San Juan to Buenos Aires. She studied psychology at the University of Buenos Aires, lived in France and the United States, and was a friend and adviser to the novelist Manuel Puig.

She worked as a translator (for example, of Émile Durkheim's The Rules of Sociological Method) and social researcher. She also worked as a psychoanalyst. One of her patients was the writer and poet Osvaldo Lamborghini. Her relationship with Lamborghini began as a psychotherapist, but then Lamborghini moved into her apartment. During a violent argument with Wajsman, Lamborghini threw her cat, named Vespasiana, from the eighth floor, killing it.

In 1990 Wajsman published the novel Informe de París. This did not sell well, but was considered to be very influential by other writers of the decade.

I do not want to do mysteries: I'm sick, I have "a few months" of life. I do not know how many. That's why I became a kind of punk (No future man) . [...] Please do not feel sorry for me: I am living, in spite of everything, one of the happiest and most fertile times of my life, even if it is in a very restricted aspect, since I do not work – I have money for I also live "a few months" – and I dedicate myself almost exclusively to writing.

— Letter from Paula Wajsman to the poet Jorge Naparstek

When she died of cancer in 1995 she left an unpublished novel called Punto atrás, two books of poetry, and 60 notebooks of poems, travel stories, and a book of short stories called Crónicas e infundios that was published in 1999. Punto atrás was eventually released in 2012 by the publishing house of the University of Villa María (EDUVIM) in the Narradoras Argentinas collection, co-directed by María Teresa Andruetto. Collectible texts that circulate in photocopies, from hand to hand, are known to have been cited by writers such as Angélica Gorodischer and María Teresa Andruetto in their blog about Argentine narrators.

== Works ==
- "Polémica: Las imágenes del imperialismo (I). Una historia de fantasmas", in Lenguajes, No. 1, April 1974.
- Informe de París. Buenos Aires, Ediciones de la Flor, 1990. ISBN 950-515-038-5.
- Crónicas e infundios. 1999.
- Punto atrás. EDUVIM 2012. ISBN 9789871868971.
