= Paola Kaufmann =

Argentine writer and biologist

- Born: March 8, 1969; General Roca, Río Negro, Argentina
- Died: September 25, 2006 (aged 37)
- Education: University of Buenos Aires
- Awards: Prêmio Casa de las Américas, Prêmio Planeta

Paola Yanielli Kaufmann (March 8, 1969 – September 25, 2006) was an Argentine writer and biologist.

== Biography ==
Kaufmann was born in General Roca, a city in the Río Negro province in Argentina, where she spent most of her childhood and teenage years. In 1987 she moved to Buenos Aires, Argentina where she enrolled in life sciences at the University of Buenos Aires. In 1993, she obtained a PhD in neuroscience. She became a postdoctoral researcher at the Smith College in Northhampton, Massachusetts. In 2003 she returned to Buenos Aires. She died of a brain tumor in Buenos Aires at 37 years of age.

She was awarded the "Prêmio Casa de las Américas" for her novel La Hermana, a biographical novel about Emily Dickinson. Her works were also awarded the "Prêmio Planeta" and twice with the "Prêmio do Fondo Nacional de las Artes". She left behind a book of unedited stories La ninfómana y el trepanador.
