= Silvina Reinaudi =

Argentine writer

- Born: 12 March 1942 (age 84); Río Cuarto, Argentina
- Occupations: Writer, puppeteer, teacher, playwright, director
- Awards: ACE Award (2001); Konex Award (2001)

Silvina Reinaudi (born 12 March 1942) is an Argentine children's literature writer and puppeteer, best known for her numerous plays with puppets presented in Argentina and Spain.

== Early life ==
Silvina Reinaudi was born and raised in Río Cuarto, but in 1982 she moved to Buenos Aires, where she currently resides. She studied law and literature, but did not take to either of these, rather devoting her whole life to making puppets, creating shows, and composing plays for children. She has two daughters, Martina and Luciana Miravalles.

== Career ==
In 1979 she founded the company Asomados y escondidos, together with Roly Serrano, with which she presented numerous puppet plays in Argentina and Spain, most notably Huevito de ida y vuelta, El dueño del cuento, Con la música a otra parte, and Cucurucho de cuentos. With her company Reinaudi created several characters that she would later include in her published stories, such as the little dog Rito, Marimonia, and Sonio. These last two characters appeared on the program Cablín con Marimonia y Sonio, broadcast by the now-defunct children's cable channel Cablín.

She works at the children's magazine Billiken, where she is in charge of the Billy supplement, designed for young children.

== Selected plays ==
- El dueño del cuento, with Rolando Serrano (1988)
- Sietevidas (1993)
- Huevito de ida y vuelta, with Sergio Blostein (1995)
- Cuentos con yapa (1998)
- Cuentos con la almohada (1998)
- Sietevidas. El regreso del gato (2001)

== Awards ==
- ACE Award for Children's Theater (2001)
- Konex Award Merit Diploma for Children's and Young Adult Entertainment (2001)
- María Guerrero Career Award (2003)
- ATINA Career Award (2010)
- ATINA Award for Dramaturgy (2015)
