= Mirta Hortas =

Argentine writer (1949–2022)

Mirta Hortas (1949–2022) was an Argentine writer. She was born in Buenos Aires in 1949. She was one of the founders of the Mario Jorge de Lellis literary workshop. Some of her early stories were published in the literary magazine El Escarabajo de Oro, edited by Abelardo Castillo.

She lived in Paris, France and Lisbon, Portugal for some years before returning to Argentina in 2000. Upon returning, she once again resumed an active literary career, publishing the works En espejo ajeno (Galerna, 2005), El tajo (Paradiso, 2015) and Punta Rasa (Paradiso, 2019). Her works were also published in Spain.

She also served as vice-president of PEN Argentina.

Her husband was the writer Jorge Asís, with whom she had four children.
