= Rodolfo Rabanal =

Argentine journalist and writer (1940–2020)

- Born: Rodolfo Oscar Rabanal; June 15, 1940; Buenos Aires, Argentina
- Died: November 2, 2020 (aged 80); Buenos Aires, Argentina
- Resting place: La Chacarita Cemetery

Rafael Oscar Rabanal (15 June 1940 – 2 November 2020) was an Argentine writer and journalist, managing editor and columnist in various Argentine and foreign media.

== Career ==
He studied two courses related to humanities, without finishing them, before becoming a journalist. He has worked as a correspondent, editor and columnist, mainly in La Nación, an Argentine newspaper among other print media. In 1979 Rodolfo received a scholarship to participate in the International Writers Workshop at the University of Iowa in the United States. In the 1980s he was Assistant Secretary of Culture under President Raúl Alfonsín. In 1988 he received a Guggenheim fellowship. He also received several prizes; the Municipal Novel Award in 1995, the prize of "club de los 13" in 1997, and the "Pen Club Argentino" award for Cita en Marruecos as the best novel of the year in 1998. His works have been translated into French, English and Polish. In 2010 he was distinguished as one of the 200 individuals who contributed most to the culture.

His first novel, El Apartado (1975) made him popular in his own country and also won a prize awarded by the literary and artistic café Bar-Baró. Many writers consider this novel as a cult novel.

In 1978, his second novel, Un día perfecto, was published in Barcelona and quickly became a best seller with over thirty thousand copies sold, a considerable amount for that time.

A year later, in 1979, Rabanal received a Fulbright scholarship to participate in the International Writers Workshop at the University of Iowa in the United States, which allowed him to leave Argentina during the military rule. His third novel was published in Argentina and Spain simultaneously.

After returning from the United States he spent almost a year in Buenos Aires before going with his family to France, where he settled down in Paris as a correspondent for a Buenos Aires newspaper. Following disagreements in the coverage of the Falklands War, he resigned that position. Almost immediately he started to work as a translator for UNESCO and the Ministry of Culture of France as a cultural attaché. The ministry was in the charge of Jack Lang at that time.

He returned to Buenos Aires in 1984 and a year later his fourth book El pasajero appeared. During the first decade of democracy, Rabanal was named Undersecretary of Culture of the Nation by President Raúl Alfonsín. In 1988 the draft of his novel La Vida brillante was awarded a fellowship by the Guggenheim Foundation in New York. That same novel would receive years later the Municipal Prize of the city of Buenos Aires.

Other books by him are: No vaya a Génova en invierno (stories), Los peligros de la dicha and the novels El factor sentimental (1990), Cita en Marruecos (1995), which won the prize "Los Trece" of Buenos Aires and was also Rómulo Gallegos prize finalist, La mujer Rusa (2004) y El héroe sin nombre (2006). A book of essays El roce de Dante was published in 2008. In 2011 he published La Vida Privada. In April 2014 he published La vida Escrita, a development of two decades of personal notes about the life of a writer and his country.

He has published a book of essays and a travelogue La Costa Bárbara (2000) and a children's novella Noche en Gondwana (1988). In 1987 he wrote the script "Gombrowiz or La seducción", directed by Alberto Fischerman.

In the 1990s he worked as a literature teacher at the University of Buenos Aires. Rodolfo Rabanal lived in Uruguay.

== Works ==
- El apartado (The Section) (1975)
- Un dïa perfecto (A Perfect Day) (1978)
- En otra parte (Elsewhere) (1982)
- El pasajero (The Passenger) (1984)
- No vaya a Génova en invierno (Do not go to Genoa in winter) (1988)
- Noche en Gondwana (Night in Gondwana) (1988)
- El factor sentimental (The sentimental factor) (1990)
- La Vida brillante (Bright Life) (1993)
- Cita en Marruecos (Appointment in Morocco) (1995)
- Los peligros de la dicha (The dangers of happiness) (1999)
- La Costa Bárbara (The Costa Barbara) (2000)
- La mujer Rusa (The Russian woman) (2004)
- El héroe sin nombre (The hero without a name) (2006)
- El roce de Dante (The touch of Dante) (2008)
- La Vida Privada (The private life) (2011)
- La vida Escrita (The written life) (2014)
