= Blanca Irurzun =

Argentine poet, artist and teacher

Blanca Lelia Irurzun (1910–1999) was an Argentine poet, artist and teacher. She was born in La Banda in the province of Santiago del Estero. The daughter of teachers, Blanca also trained as a teacher, along with her four brothers.

At an early age, she took part in the local theatre of La Banda. This brought her into contact with artistic figures such as Juan Giménez García and José Gómez Basualdo. She was an active member of the cultural group La Brasa. As an author, she published extensively in a number of genres, including short stories, poetry, essays and plays.

She married Miguel Gabarain in the 1950s and moved to Buenos Aires, where she continued her writing career. She died there in 1999.

== Selected prizes ==
- Premio de la Comisión Nacional de Cultura in 1942, for "Emoción y sentido de mis llanuras".
- Premio de Honor de Sade - Santiago del Estero in 1981.

== Selected works ==
=== Stories ===
- Changos, 1939.
- El racimo verde, 1946.
- Cuentos demorados, 1989.

=== Poetry ===
- Horizontes, 1941.
- Sobre cántaro reseco agua fresca y clara, 1968.
- Luna florecida en blancos astronautas, 1981.

=== Essays ===
- Datos para la historia del pueblo que nombro y que amo, 1972.
- Emoción y sentido de mis llanuras, 1942.
- Geografía emocional de mi tierra, 1989

=== Theatre ===
- Las manos al sol.
- Juan Francisco Borges.
- Es que algunos ... están ciegos.
- Una mujer.
