= Sara Solá de Castellanos =

Argentinian writer (1890-?)

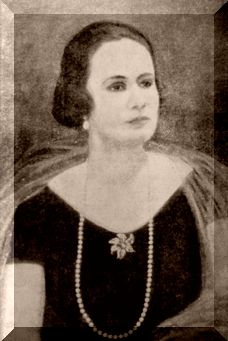
Sara Solá de Castellanos

Sara Solá de Castellanos (pen name: Violeta del Valle; 23 June 1890 – after 1928) was an Argentine poet, novelist, playwright and lyricist. She is remembered for writing the lyrics of the hymn of the city of Salta. She was also the author of two extensive poems, Poemas del paisaje and Tiempo Añorado; a series of youth poems, novels and songs; and non-fiction works related to Salta.

== Biography ==
Sara Liboria Solá Curth was born 23 June 1890 in Salta. Her parents were Manuel Solá Chavarría and Sara Curth Hidalgo. She had two brothers, Carlos Solá, and Miguel Solá, a historian, as well as one sister, Emma Solá, a poet. She was from one of the traditional families of her hometown.

Sola de Castellanos began publishing poetic compositions from a very young age in local newspapers and magazines, such as Caras y Caretas, signing with the pseudonym "Violeta del Valle". In 1923, she edited Elogio de la Vida Provinciana, which included her dramatic poem. She also composed theatrical works, among the most outstanding are: En los Tiempos Gloriosos, which premiered at the Victoria Theater in Salta in 1928 and Florilegio del Milagro y Santoral. She also composed novels, such as La Esposa del Oidor, for which she received distinctions at the Floral Games and by the Consejo Nacional de Mujeres del Argentina (National Council of Women of Argentina). She published in newspapers works of a historical nature on local issues and biographical essays on local characters or those linked to Salta's history. Sola de Castellanos was noted to be a feminist. She died in the City of Salta.

== Selected works ==
- Dios
- A la Virgen del Milagro
- Poemas del Paisaje
- Gloria a Salta
- Tiempo Añorado
- Elogio de la Vida Provinciana
- En los Tiempos Gloriosos
- Florilegio del Milagro y Santoral
- La Esposa del Oidor
