= Judith Astelarra =

Argentine-born Spanish sociologist

- Born: 1943 (age 82–83); Buenos Aires

Academic background
- Education: Cornell University
- Thesis: Land Reform in Chile During Allende's Government (1975)

Academic work
- Discipline: Sociologist
- Institutions: Autonomous University of Barcelona

Judith Astelarra Bonomi (born 1943) is an Argentine sociologist based in Spain where she has specialized in gender studies. In Chile, she contributed to work on agricultural reform in collaboration with the Inter-American Institute of Agricultural Sciences. In 1977, she was appointed Professor of Sociology at the Autonomous University of Barcelona where from 1992, as founder and coordinator of the Seminario de Estudios de la Mujer (Centre for Women Studies), she introduced gender studies in Spain. She later served at the university as Dean of the Faculty of Political Science and Sociology. Since the late 1970s, she has published widely on gender studies and feminism.

== Early life and education ==
Born in Buenos Aires in 1943, Astelarra, the oldest of nine children, was raised in an upper-class home. When she was nine, she moved with her family to Chile where she attended the Colegio Dunalastair in Santiago. On the advice of her father, she went on to study sociology at the Pontifical Catholic University of Chile. graduating in 1968. In 1966, while on an agricultural course in Israel, she met Alberto Herrero, a Spaniard from Léon, who became her partner for the next 27 years, fathering her only son Rodrigo. He died in 1992.

After graduating in 1968 in Chile, she continued her studies at Cornell University, earning a master's degree in 1971 and a Ph.D. in sociology in 1975. She had these qualifications validated at the Complutense University of Madrid in 1980 and 1981.

== Feminist development ==
While studying in Santiago, she discovered Viola Klein's works on psychology and the condition of women as well as Simone de Beauvoir's memoirs. Both encouraged her to turn to feminism and gender studies. On graduating, she joined the Department of Regional Planning at Chile's Corporation for Regional Reform (CORA). She visited areas where the first collective property models and farm workers settlements were being established. While studying in the United States, she experienced the development of student movements demanding the coverage of women's developments in the universities. She also saw Betty Friedan's creation of the National Organization for Women. After earning her doctorate in New York, she returned to Chile in 1971 where she joined the Socialist Party. In 1973, threatened with a coup d'état against Salvador Allende, together with her family she moved back to Buenos Aires where she served as a governmental official.

In 1975, to escape the dictatorships in Chile and Argentina, she and her family moved to Barcelona during the International Women's Year. She became an enthusiastic member of the women's movement in Spain, supporting initiatives for women following the death of Francisco Franco. After being appointed Professor of Sociology at the Autonomous University of Barcelona in 1977, she created the Centre for Women's Studies and, together with Marina Subirats, organized events which ultimately attracted the participation of over a thousand women, including politicians, feminists, and academics.
