= Fernanda García Lao =

Argentine writer

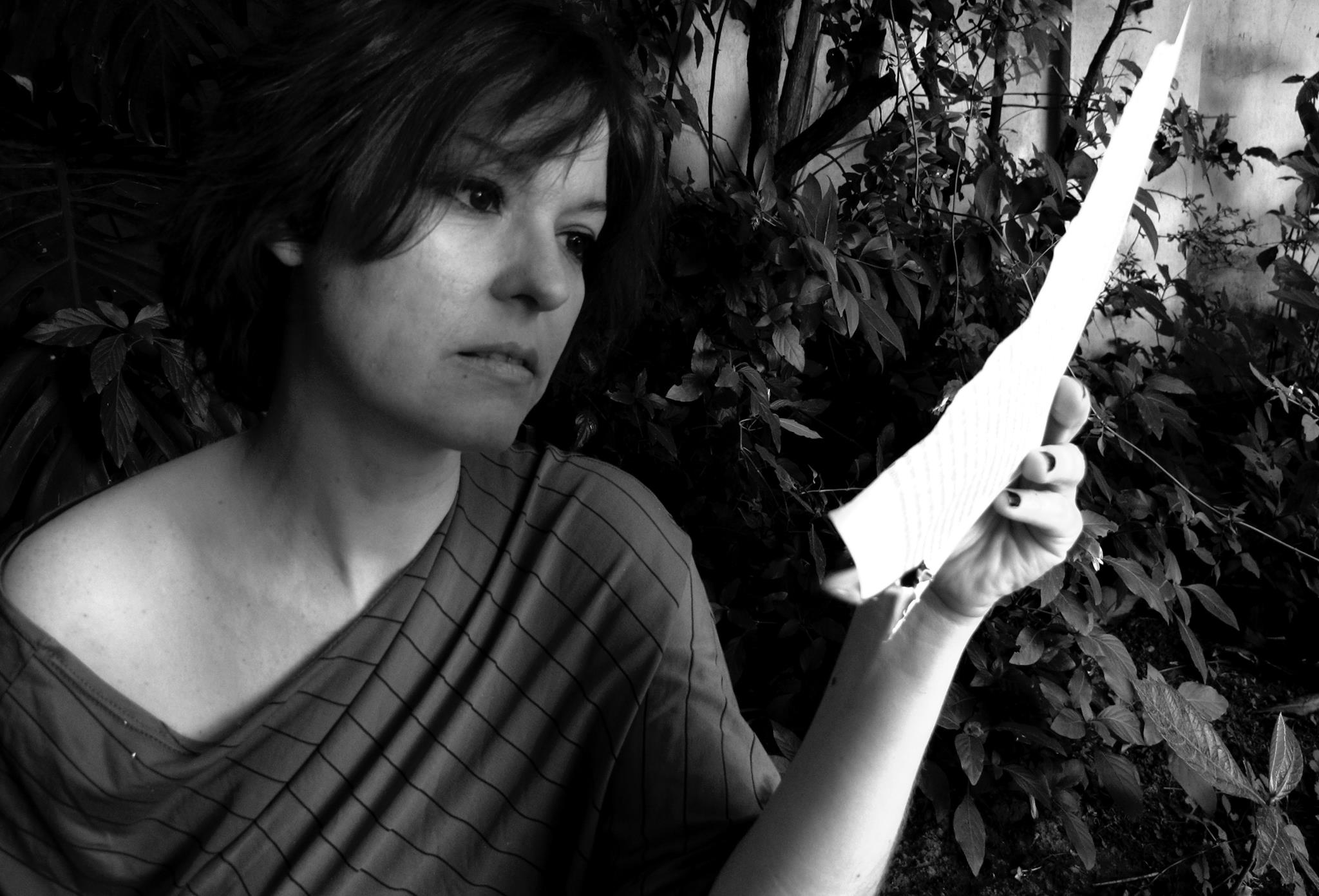
Fernanda García Lao

Fernanda García Lao (born 1966) is an Argentine writer. She was born in Mendoza. Her parents were journalists who were forced to go into exile by the ruling military junta; the family moved to Spain in 1975/76 and lived there for nearly two decades. Fernanda studied the arts and journalism in Spain, and moved back to Argentina in 1993, where she initially became active in the theatre.

She has published over a dozen books. Her novel Muerta de hambre won the first prize from the Fondo Nacional de las Artes, while another book La perfecta otra cosa came third in the Cortázar Prize competition. Her work has been translated into several languages. Her first book in English is titled Out of the Cage.

At the 2011 Guadalajara Book Fair, she was named one of the "25 Best Kept Secrets of Latin American Literature."
