= Clara Passafari =

Argentine anthropologist

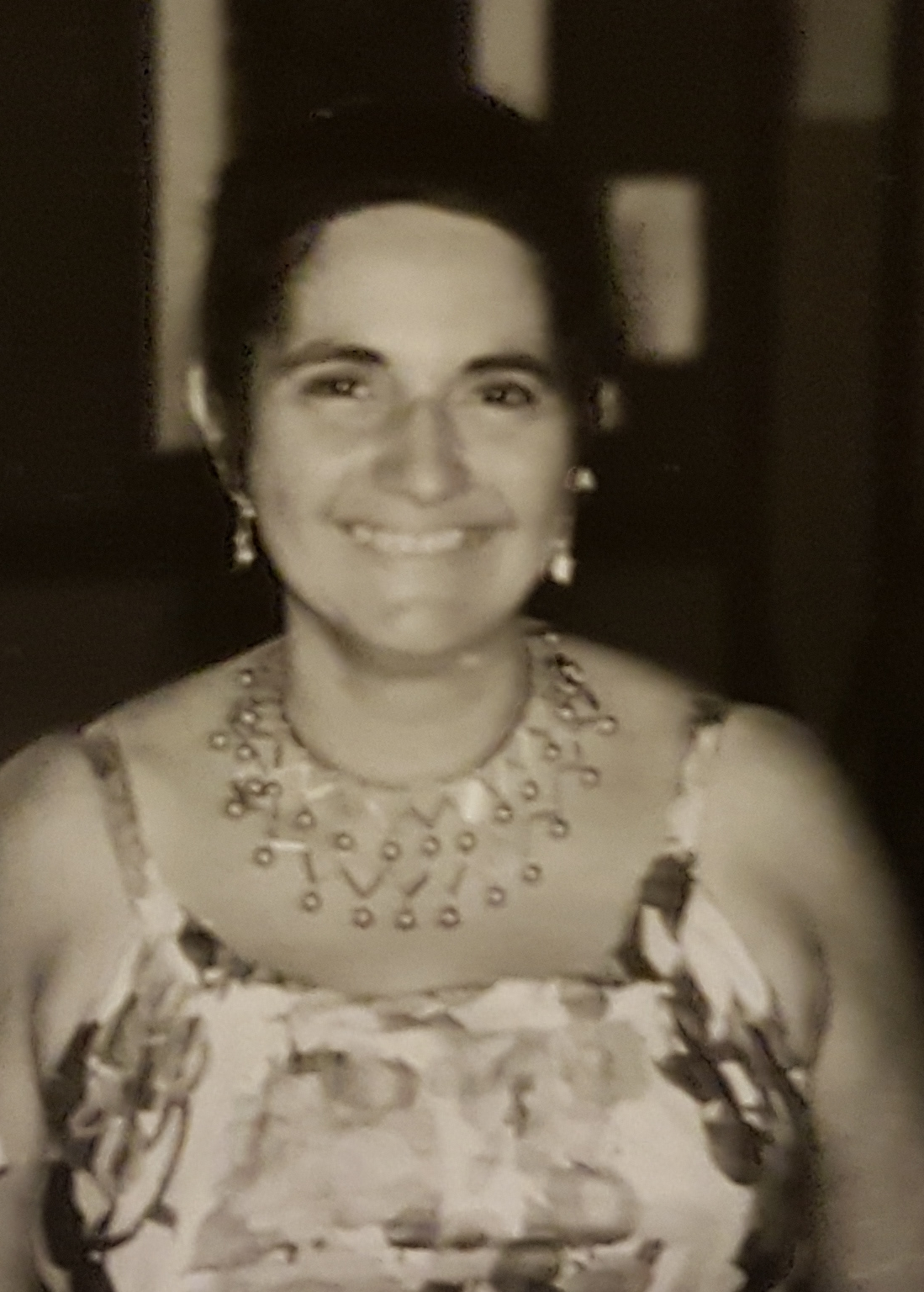
Photo belonging to the Passafari family

Professor Clara Passafari de Gutiérrez (20 March 1930 – 1994) was an Argentine ethnologist, anthropologist, writer and poet.

== Biography ==
Passafari was born in Buenos Aires in 1930. With her parents, Elizabeth Badolato and Italo Passafari, she moved to Santa Fe, Argentina at a very young age.

Passafari received her secondary education at the Institute of Our Lady of Calvary. In 1947, she obtained the degree of "Maestra Normal Nacional". She later moved to Rosario, Santa Fe, studying at the National University of Rosario (UNR) and earning the title of Professor of Philosophy and Letters.

She married Eduardo Gutierrez, and had four children from the union: Clara Monica, Laura Inés, Sergio and Claudia.

She received degrees in Sociology and Argentine Literature, and a doctorate in Philosophy and Letters. In 1975, she became the Cultural Manager of the Organization of American States. For seven years, she was the UNR's director of University Extension. From 1971 to 1992, she was a full-time researcher in early cultures while working as a professor of anthropology, studying oral tradition and folklore.

In Rosario, she spent 19 years with the Fondo Nacional de las Artes where, with Augusto Raúl Cortázar, she specialized in folklore. She was co-director of Revista Argentina de Política cultural (Argentina Journal of Cultural Policy). Passafari taught in Argentina, the US, and Europe on folklore and education, cultural entertainment, as well as cultural and traditional heritage policy actions to revive the cultural richness of traditional communities.

She died in Rosario in 1994.

== Honors ==
In 1984, the Konex Foundation honored Passafari as one of the five best Argentine experts in folklore. In 1989, she received the "Recognition Award Alicia Moreau de Justo".

== Selected works ==
- ----; Eugenio Castelli. La enseñanza de la literatura en la escuela media, 1963, reedición 1968. Ed. Huemul. Buenos Aires. 158 pp.
- Cambios en la concepción y estructura de la novela mexicana después de 1947 – Universidad Nacional del Litoral, 1967
- Folklore y educación, 1969
- Artesanía y cultura nacional. Distinguiéndosela en 1974 con "mención del Fondo Nacional de las Artes", y se edita en 1975. 164 pp.
- Aspectos tradicionales de la Cultura Isleña, con el Premio Nacional de Ensayo en 1975 por el FNA
- El puente iluminado, (poesías), 1976. Ed. Librería y Editorial Colmegna. Santa Fe, Argentina. 94 pp.
- Folclore para los más chiquitos, 1976
- Proyección artística del folklore, 1979
- De mitos y muerte (poesías). 62 pp.
- Folklore y artesanías en la política cultural del estado, 1980
- El patrimonio folclórico y su aplicación educativa
- Temas de folclore aplicado, 1982. Revised for OAS in 1986
- Animación del patrimonio folclórico e indígena, 1985. 190 pp. ISBN 950-43-0370-6
- Pueblos indios, 1986. 229 pp.
- Folklore musical del litoral. Bailes, canciones, instrumentos. 1989. Ed. Instituto Argentino de Investigaciones de Política Cultural. Buenos Aires. 53 pp. ISBN 950-99366-0-X
