= Natalia Litvinova =

Argentine poet (born 1986)

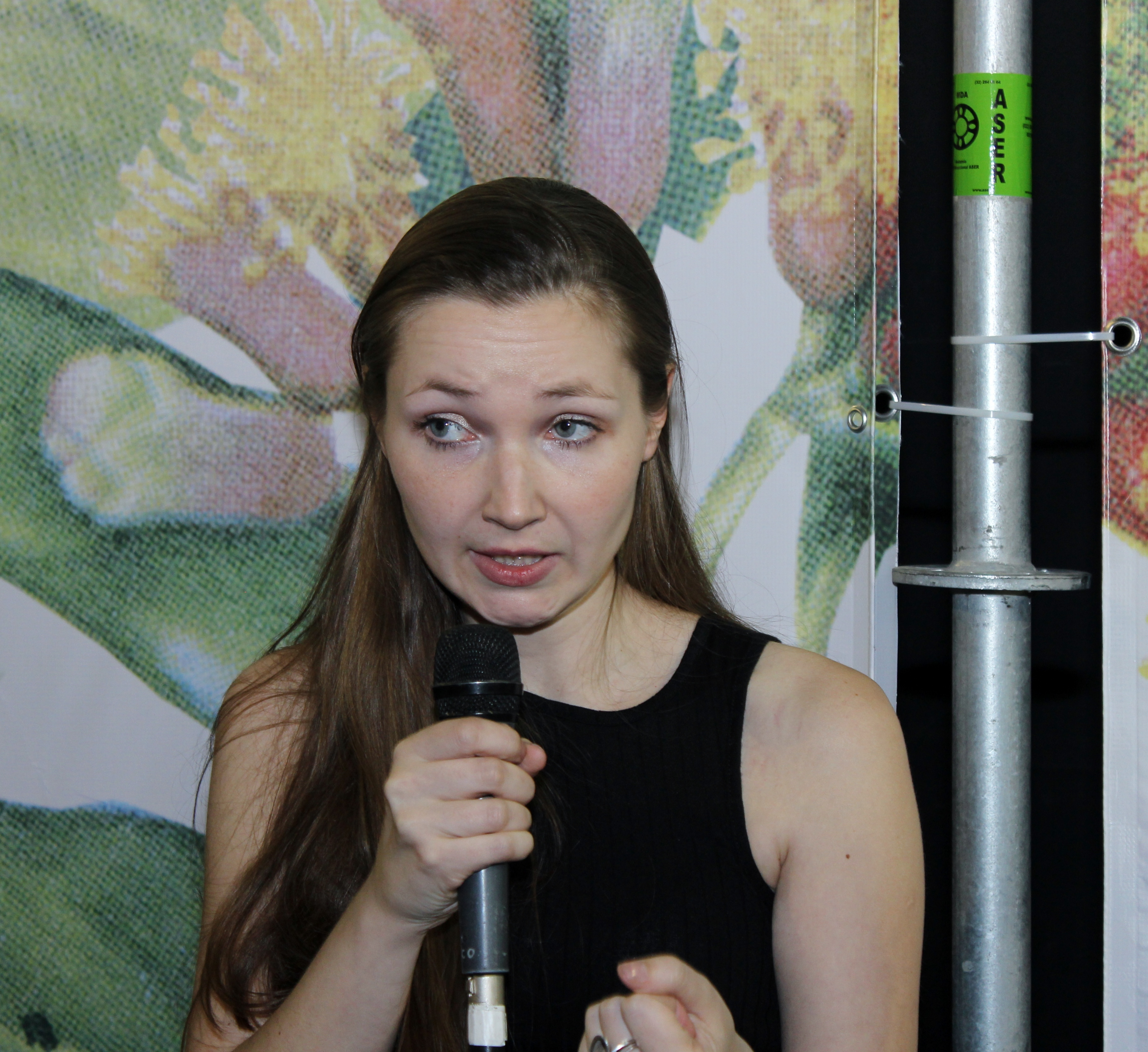
Natalia Litvinova

Natalia Litvinova (born 1986, Gomel, Belarusian SSR) is an Argentinian writer and editor of Belarusian origins, working in the fields of poetry and translation.

== Life and writing ==
Litvinova was born in Gomel, Belarus, in 1986. In the 1990s, when she was about to turn 10 years old, her family decided to emigrate to Buenos Aires. She began writing poems inspired by the poetry of Federico Garcia Lorca and the oral tradition, including elements such as stories, jokes, and songs. At twenty years old, she attended a workshop led by the Argentinian poet Javier Galarza. There she put together her first poetry collection, in which she describes certain events that happened in her childhood.

Litvinova has published 10 books of poetry written in Spanish to date, and will publish her debut novel in 2024. When she creates her work, Litvinova is inspired by authors who write about the experience of war and exile from different perspectives, as she herself identifies with these themes. Her most recent book is Soñka, manos de oro, published in 2022 by Spanish publisher La Bella Varsovia.

As of 2022, Litvinova is represented by Aevitas Creative Management and is working on her debut novel.

== Career ==
In 2016, together with Tom Maver, she founded the publishing house Editorial Llantén, which is located in Buenos Aires and specializes in Russian poetry translation, both classical and contemporary. Litvinova has compiled and translated various anthologies of Russian poets of the Silver Age, such as Innokenty Annensky, Sergei Yesenin, and Marina Tsvetaeva, among others. As a translator from Russian into Spanish, she maintains a blog called Animales en bruto.

She has led creative writing workshops and courses at the Fundación Centro Psicoanalítico Argentino, directs the translation collection at Melón editora and coordinates the section dedicated to Argentine letters at Revista Ombligo. She represented Argentina at the International Poetry Festival of Granada (Nicaragua) in 2015.

== Translation into other languages ==
Litvinova's poetry has been published in Germany, France, Spain, Chile, Brazil, Colombia and the United States. Her poetry has been translated into French and published by the French publishing house Al Manar. Some of her poems have been translated into English by Kelsi Vanada and published in literary journals such as Columbia Journal, the Action Books Blog, and The Southern Review. Vanada's translation of the collection Cesto de trenzas will be published as Basket of Braids in 2024 by Shearsman Books. Litvinova was a featured poet at the virtual PEN America Women in Translation Month reading series in 2021.

== Honors and awards ==
In 2024, Litvinova won the Lumen novel prize for her novel Luciérnaga, which will be published in September 2024 by Lumen, an imprint of Penguin Random House Grupo Editorial. In 2017, she was awarded the "Premio estímulo" prize from the Argentine Foundation for Poetry.

== Works ==
=== Poetry collections ===
- 2010 - Esteparia. Ediciones del Dock. Republished in Spain and Uruguay.
- 2012 - Balbuceo de la noche. Melón editora. ISBN 987283471-7
- 2012 - Grieta. Gog y Magog. Republished in Spain and Costa Rica. ISBN 978-84-16149-09-4
- 2013 - Rocío Animal. La Pulga Renga.
- 2013 - Todo ajeno. Vaso roto. ISBN 978-84-15168-71-3
- 2014 - Cuerpos textualizados. Letra viva. Written with coauthor Javier Galarza
- 2015 - Siguiente vitalidad. Audisea. Republished in Spain (by La Bella Varsovia, in 2016), Mexico, and Chile
- 2018 - Cesto de trenzas. La Bella Varsovia. ISBN 978-84-946544-8-0. Republished in Argentina by Editorial Llantén, 2019
- 2020 - La nostalgia es un sello ardiente. Editorial Llantén. Republished in Spain (by La Bella Varsovia, in 2020) ISBN 978-987-863-981-9
- 2022 - Soñka, manos de oro. Editorial Llantén
- 2024 - Basket of Braids (English translation of Cesto de trenzas). Shearsman Books. ISBN 9781848619371

=== Prose ===
- 2024 - Luciérnaga. Lumen.

=== Anthologies ===
- Jardín, cien poemas sobre flores, de cien poetas argentinxs. Proyecto Camalote.
- 2017 - Antología premio estímulo 2017. Vinciguerra. ISBN 978-987750175-9
