= Viviana Gorbato =

Argentine journalist, writer and university professor

- Born: 26 October 1950; Buenos Aires, Argentina
- Died: 10 May 2005 (aged 54); Buenos Aires, Argentina
- Education: University of Buenos Aires
- Occupations: Journalist, writer, professor
- Years active: 1984–2005
- Employer: University of Buenos Aires

Viviana Gorbato (26 October 1950 – 10 May 2005) was an Argentine journalist, writer, and university professor.

== Biography ==
Viviana Gorbato was born in Buenos Aires to an upper middle class Jewish family.

When she was a teenager she created a magazine with her friends from high school, formed a theater group, and won a literary contest for a book of unpublished stories. She graduated as a professor of Literature at the Faculty of Philosophy and Letters of the University of Buenos Aires (UBA).

She obtained a General Certificate of Education at the University of London. In her first years she worked as an advertising copywriter.

She worked as a literature teacher until 1984. When journalist Jacobo Timerman (1923–1999) took over the management of the newspaper La Razón, she wrote asking him to allow her to work with him in his medium. Timerman hired her. After that, she worked as an editor at the weekly newspaper El Periodista de Buenos Aires, and published notes and contributions in the newspapers Clarín and Página/12.

She was the creative director of the agency Johnson, Benton & Bowles.

She taught on methods of journalistic research at the University of Belgrano and the UBA.

To write La Argentina embrujada... el supermercadismo espiritual de los ricos y famosos (1996) she infiltrated the sect School of Yoga in Buenos Aires under the guise of writing a book in favor of its leader, Juan Percowich. The book dealt with mentalists and gurus and their influence on politicians and celebrities. It was temporarily banned by a judge at the request of a female directive of the yoga school that appeared naked in a photograph along with another woman.

When the book began to be sold throughout Argentina, Buenos Aires judge Luis Alberto Dupou banned Atlántida publishing house from distributing it. Days later, Gorbato appeared on the program Almorzando con Mirtha Legrand, where she exposed the problem of destructive cults in Argentina. As a result of these statements, she later debated with journalist and new-age author Claudio María Domínguez – a follower of Sai Baba.

I wrote that book to warn unsuspecting people about fraud and swindles. I say it's a self-defense manual. Chesterton said: "When man stops believing in God, he begins to believe in everything."

— Viviana Gorbato

In Fruta prohibida (2000) she explored the circles of homosexual encounters, and received praise and criticism; there were those who questioned the book, comparing it with "a walk through the zoo".

Gorbato was a professor of Communication Sciences at the University of Buenos Aires. She directed a study on the influence of mass media on the formation of learning models in children.

With a fellowship from the Chagas Foundation, she researched sexuality and power in Argentina.

She was a professor of the subject Methods and Techniques of Journalistic Research at the University of Belgrano.

Beginning in 2004, Gorbato hosted the program Generaciones en conflicto on Radio Cooperativa in Buenos Aires, along with journalists Bruno Gerondi and Gabriel Zicolillo. She was preparing an "unauthorized biography" of President Néstor Kirchner.

On 10 May 2005 she suffered a "serious decompensation" in her apartment in downtown Buenos Aires. She was treated by paramedics from the Urgent Medical Attention Service (SAME), but died after 9:00 am. On the same day, a newspaper claimed that she "had been carrying an illness" for some time. In 2011, the writer and sociologist Juan José Sebreli affirmed in his memoirs that Viviana Gorbato committed suicide. She is buried in the Cementerio Jardín de Paz in Pilar, Buenos Aires.

== Books ==
- Vandor o Perón (1st ed.). De La Urraca. 1992. ISBN 978-950-9265-24-0.
- Los competidores del diván: el auge de las terapias alternativas en la Argentina (1st ed.). Espasa-Calpe. 1994. ISBN 978-950-852-056-2.
- Amor y sexo en la Argentina – la vida erótica en los '90 (1st ed.). Planeta. 1995. ISBN 978-950-742-683-4. in collaboration with Susana Finkel
- La Argentina embrujada: el supermercadismo espiritual de los ricos y famosos (1st ed.). Atlántida. 1997. ISBN 978-950-08-1713-4.
- Noche tras noche (1st ed.). Atlántida. 1997. ISBN 978-950-08-1897-1.
- Fruta prohibida (1st ed.). Atlántida. 1999. ISBN 978-950-08-2133-9.
- Montoneros, soldados de Menem. ¿Soldados de Duhalde? (1st ed.). Sudamericana. 1999. ISBN 978-950-07-1636-9. with prologue by Jorge Fernández Díaz
- Vote fama - El strip tease de la clase política argentina (1st ed.). Sudamericana. 2000. ISBN 978-950-07-1884-4.
