= Matilde Alba Swann =

Argentine poet, journalist, and lawyer

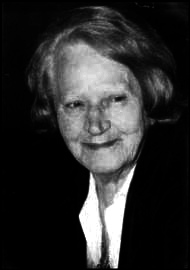
- Born: Matilde Kirilovsky; 24 February 1912; Berisso, Argentina
- Died: 13 September 2000 (aged 88); La Plata, Argentina
- Burial place: La Plata Cemetery
- Education: National University of La Plata
- Occupations: Poet, journalist, lawyer
- Spouse: Samuel Creimer
- Children: 5

Matilde Kirilovsky de Creimer (24 February 1912 – 13 September 2000), better known by her penname Matilde Alba Swann, was an Argentine poet, journalist, and lawyer. She was one of the first women to earn a law degree at the National University of La Plata, in 1933.

== Biography ==
Matilde Kirilovsky was born in Berisso on 24 February 1912, the daughter of Russian immigrants Alaquin Kirilovsky and Emma Ioffe. She earned her baccalaureate at the Colegio Superior de Señoritas (now Liceo Víctor Mercante) in 1929, and her licentiate in law at the National University of La Plata in 1933.

As a lawyer, she focused on defending the interests of minorities and underprivileged children, and served as an advisor to the Ministry of Social Action and the Ministry of Health.

She married Samuel Creimer in the 1940s, and they had five children.

She published eight books of poetry and countless newspaper articles. She was a correspondent for the newspaper El Día during the Falklands War. She also served as president of the La Plata branch of the Argentine Writers' Society. Her poems were praised by Jorge Luis Borges, and she was close friends with writer Ernesto Sabato.

She died in La Plata on 13 September 2000, and was buried at La Plata Cemetery.

== Awards and recognition ==
- Province of Buenos Aires Award for Poetry, 1991
- Santa Clara de Asís Award from the League of Family Mothers, 1991
- Nomination for the Nobel Prize in Literature, 1992
- Declared an Illustrious Citizen of the City of La Plata, Post Mortem, 2005
- Augusto Mario Delfino Award for Poetry

== Publications ==
- Canción y grito (1955)
- Salmo al retorno (1956)
- Madera para mi mañana (1957)
- Tránsito del infinito adentro (1959)
- Coral y remolino (1960)
- Grillo y cuna (1971)
- Con un hijo bajo el brazo (1978)
- Crónica de mí misma (1980)
