= Manuela Fingueret =

Argentine writer and educator

Manuela Fingueret (August 9, 1945 – March 11, 2013) was an Argentine writer and educator.

== Biography ==
The daughter of Lithuanian-Jewish immigrants, she was born in the La Chacarita barrio of Buenos Aires and studied to become a teacher and journalist. Fingueret was director of the Area de Cultura Judia del Centro Cultural General San Martin. She was programming director for FM Jai, a Jewish radio station and worked for several Jewish publications, including Nueva Sion and Arca del Sur.

In 1975, she published her first collection of poetry Tumultos contenidos (Contained tumult). It was followed by Heredarás Babel (You will inherit Babylon) in 1977 and La piedra es una llaga en el tiempo (The stone is a wound in time) in 1980.

Fingueret was a long-time fan of the Atlanta soccer club and was given an honorary lifetime membership to the club in 2006.

== Selected works ==
- Ciudad en fuga y otros infiernos (City in flight and other hells), poetry (1984)
- Eva y las máscaras (Eve and the masks), poetry (1987)
- Las picardías de Hérshele (Hershele's mischief), children's book (1989)
- Los huecos de tu cuerpo (The hollows of your body), poetry (1992)
- Blues de la calle Leiva (Leiva street blues), novel (1995)
- Hija del silencio (Daughter of silence), novel (2000)

== See also ==
- Lists of writers
