= Alicia Kozameh =

Argentine writer (born 1953)

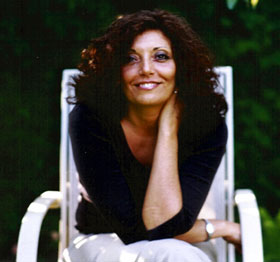
Alicia Kozameh, by Gabriela Vázquez

Alicia Kozameh (born March 20, 1953) is an Argentine novelist, short story writer and poet, and Professor in the Creative Writing Program, Department of English, at Chapman University in Southern California. Kozameh has published eight novels, three collections of short stories and six books of poetry. She has also edited two anthologies and wrote a book in collaboration with other authors, former political prisoners from the last Argentine military dictatorship in her country.

== Life ==
Alicia Kozameh was born in Rosario, Santa Fe, to a father of Syrian-Lebanese Christian background and a mother of Jewish origin. She studied philosophy and literature at the University of Rosario from 1973 to 1975, and at the University of Buenos Aires from 1985 to 1987. Her studies were interrupted from September 1975 until December 1978 while she was detained as a political prisoner during Argentina's most recent military dictatorship. After her release, she continued to suffer constant repression and persecution, and was forced to go into exile in 1980, first in California, and later in Mexico.

During her exile, she published works in Mexico and California and wrote her first novel, El séptimo sueño (The Seventh Dream), a manuscript she decided not to publish. She returned to Argentina in 1984, after the Falklands War and the return of democratic elections to her country.

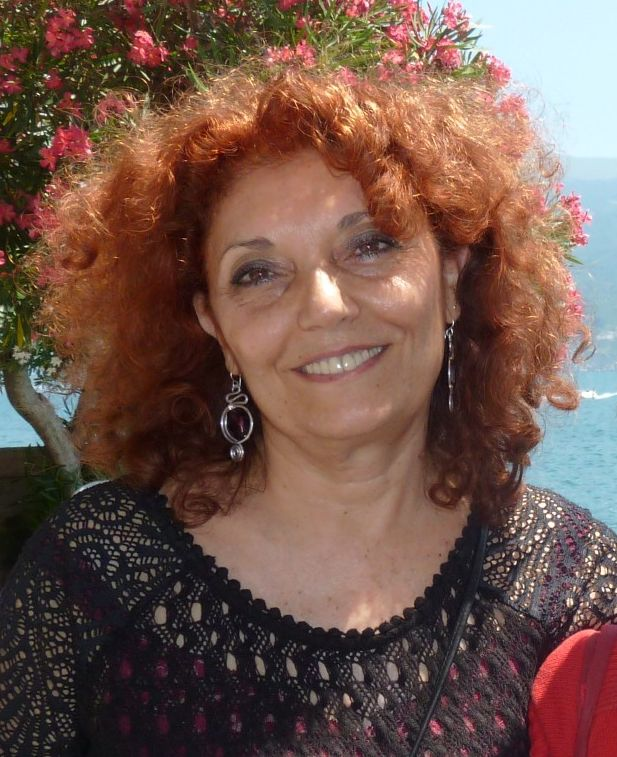
Alicia Kozameh 2015 in Gargnano, Italy

In 1987, the Editorial Contrapunto, in Buenos Aires, published her second novel, Pasos bajo el agua (Steps Under Water), a fictionalized account of her experiences as a political prisoner and an exile. Many other articles and stories were published in newspapers and cultural magazines in Buenos Aires during that period, as well as reviews of Pasos bajo el agua, which sold out in six months. In Buenos Aires, she completed a screenplay based on her novel Steps Under Water. The English translation of Pasos bajo el agua (Steps Under Water) was published by University of California Press in 1996. The novel has been included in course syllabi of numerous university classes in the United States. The German version of this novel, Schritte unter Wasser, was published by Milena Verlag Editions, Vienna, in 1999.

As a consequence of the publication of Pasos bajo el agua in 1987, Kozameh was threatened by members of the Argentine political police. She returned to California for her family's safety in 1988. Since then, she has been invited by Amnesty International to participate in panel discussions and speak at conferences about her literary works and experiences as a political prisoner.

Her third novel is Patas de Avestruz (Ostrich Legs), from which several chapters have been published in different literary magazines and anthologies. Straussenbeine, a German translation of the novel, was published by Milena Verlag in 1997, and the English translation was published by WingsPress, Texas, in 2013. Her novel 259 saltos, uno inmortal, a reflection about exile, was published by Narvaja Publishers, Argentina, in November 2001, and a second edition was published by Alción Editora in 2012. Its English version, 259 Leaps, the Last Immortal, has come out in the fall of 2006 by WingsPress, Texas.

Alción Editora, Córdoba, Argentina, published a new edition of Pasos bajo el agua in November 2002. In 2003 Alción also published the Spanish version of Patas de avestruz, and in July 2004 Ofrenda de propia piel, a collection of short stories, came out by the same publishing house. In 2009 Alción published her book of poetry Mano en vuelo.

In August 2005 and 2006, the anthologies Caleidoscopio: la mujer en la mira and Caleidoscopio 2: inmigrantes en la mira were published by the Instituto Movilizador de Fondos Cooperativos, Buenos Aires.

Her most recent works include the novels Basse danse (2007), Natatio aeterna (2011), Eni Furtado no ha dejado de correr (2013), Bruno regresa descalzo (2016), and El séptimo sueño (2026).

Kozameh's works have been widely anthologized. She is frequently invited to give readings and lectures at literary conferences and at special presentations organized by Departments of Languages and Literature throughout the United States, Latin America, and Europe. She is an active participant of such organizations as Latin American Studies Association (LASA).

Alicia Kozameh lives in Los Angeles, where she continues writing, while teaching creative writing at Chapman University.

== Awards ==
One of the chapters from the book, "Carta a Aubervillieres," ("Letter to Aubervillieres"), received the "CRISIS" award for best short story in 1986. She also received the Memoria histórica de las mujeres en América Latina y el Caribe 2000 literary award for her short story "Winds of Perpendicular Rotation."

== Works ==
=== Novels ===
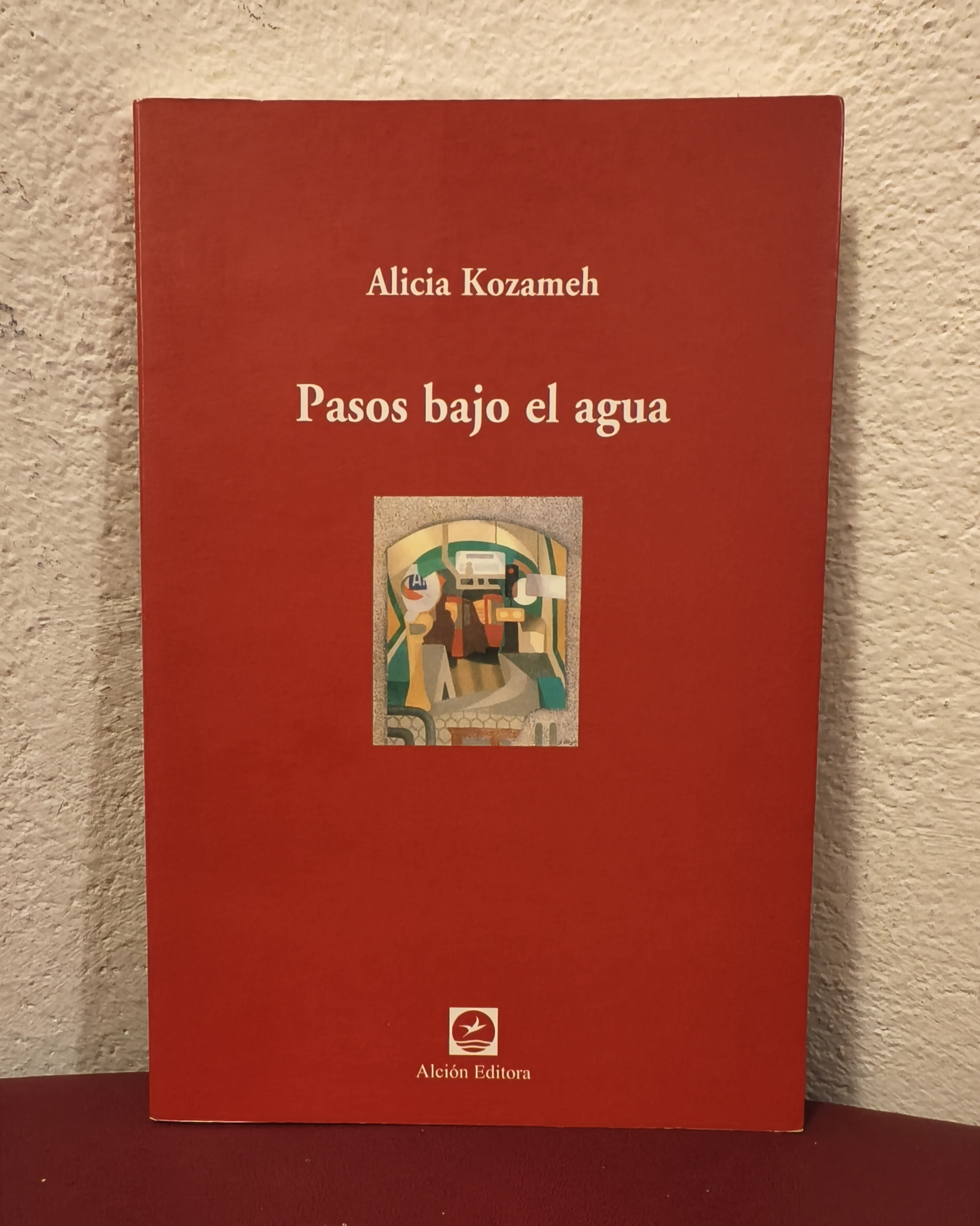
Alicia Kozameh: novel Pasos bajo el agua, edition of Alción Editora, 2002

- Pasos bajo el agua, Buenos Aires: Contrapunto 1987. Córdoba: Alción Editora 2002, 2006. ISBN 978-987-1359-61-5
- 259 saltos, uno inmortal, Córdoba: Narvaja 2001. Córdoba: Alción Editora 2012. ISBN 978-987-646-281-5 Madrid: barbarie editora 2022. ISBN 978-84-124923-0-9
- Patas de avestruz, Córdoba: Alción 2003. ISBN 978-987-1359-59-2 German: Straußenbeine. Roman. Übersetzt aus dem argentinischen Spanisch von Erna Pfeiffer. Wien: Milena Verlag, 1997.
- Basse danse. Córdoba: Alción 2007. ISBN 978-987-1359-37-0

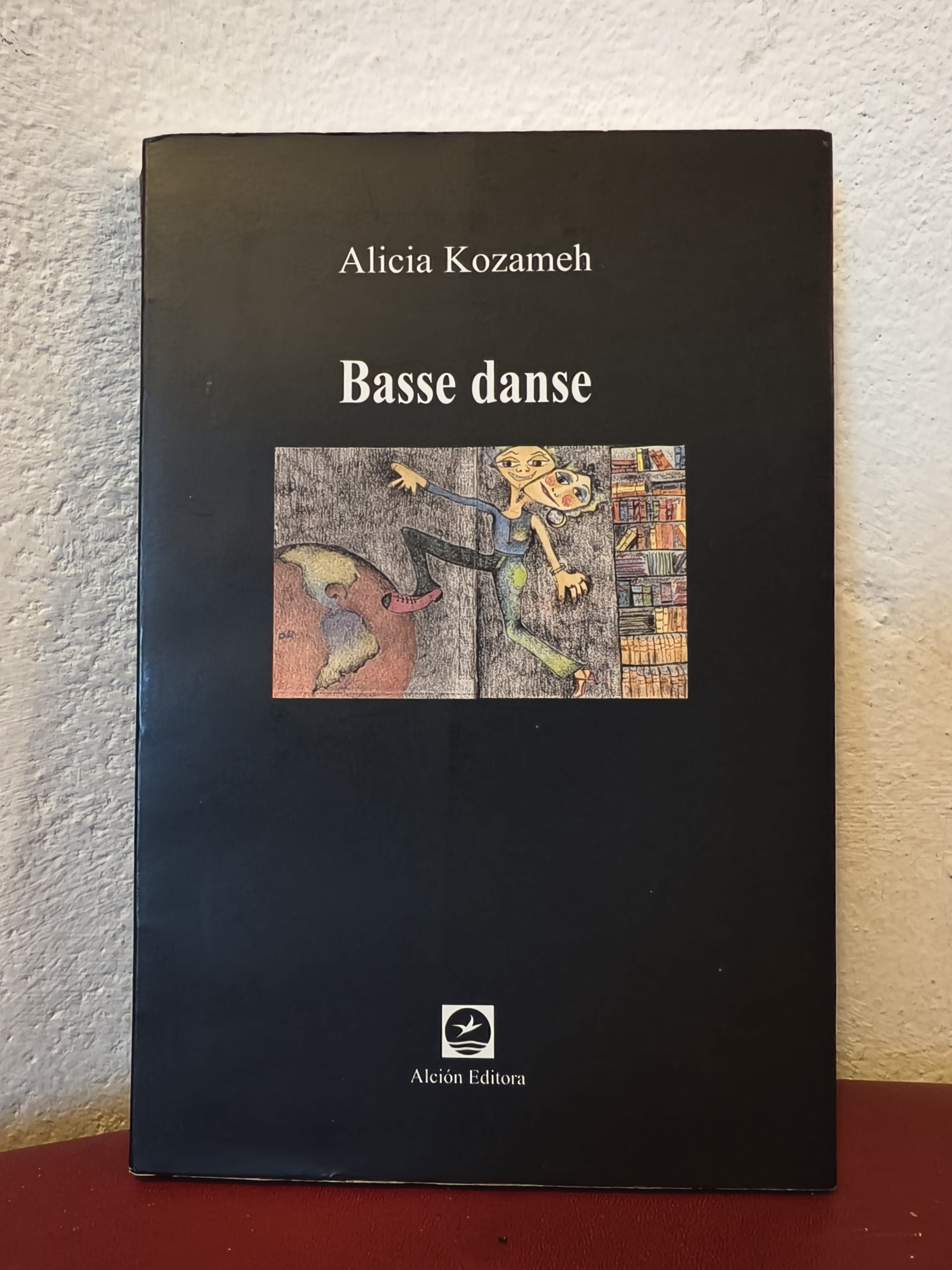
Alicia Kozameh: novel Basse danse, Alción Editora, 2007

- Natatio aeterna. Córdoba (Argentina): Alción Editora, 2011. ISBN 978-987-646-205-1
- Eni Furtado no ha dejado de correr. Córdoba (Argentina): Alción Editora, 2013. ISBN 978-987-646-355-3
- Bruno regresa descalzo. Córdoba (Argentina): Alción Editora, 2016. ISBN 978-987-646-587-8
- El séptimo sueño. Coordinación general, presentación y lecturas críticas a cargo de: María A. Semilla Durán. Colaboración de: Erna Pfeiffer y Enrique Foffani, Córdoba (Argentina): Alción Editora, 2026. ISBN 978-631-6583-78-9

=== Short stories ===
- "Alcira in Yellows", translated by Roberta Gordenstein, in: Agosín, Marjorie / Horan, Elizabeth Rosa (eds.): The House of Memory: Stories by Jewish Women Writers of Latin America. The Feminist Press at The City University of New York, New York, 1999, pp. 153–161.
- Ofrenda de propia piel, Córdoba: Alción 2004.
- "Impression of Heights", translated by Andrea G. Labinger, in: Díaz, Gwendolyn (ed.): Women and Power: A Critical Anthology of Contemporary Argentine Women Authors. Austin (Texas): University of Texas Press, 2007, pp. 323-327.
- Bosquejo de alturas, Córdoba: Alción 2020.
- Ofrenda de propia piel 2, Córdoba: Alción, 2022.

=== Poems ===
- Mano en vuelo, Córdoba: Alción 2009. ISBN 978-987-646-079-8

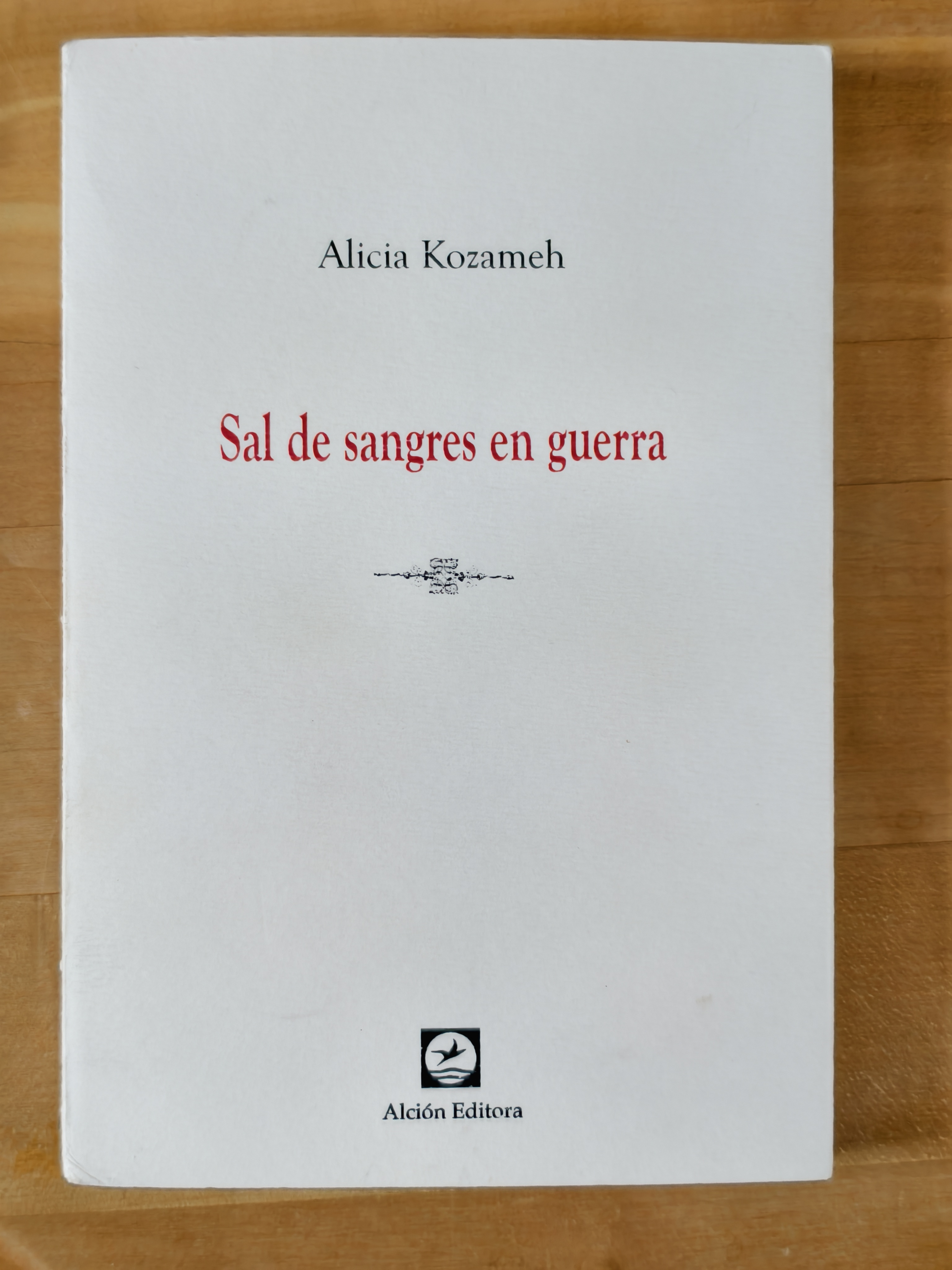
Alicia Kozameh: Sal de sangres en guerra

- Sal de sangres en guerra, Córdoba: Alción 2018. ISBN 978-987-646-735-3
- Sal de sangres en declive, Córdoba: Alción 2019. ISBN 978-987-646-802-2
- Sal de sangres en pánico, Córdoba: Alción 2020. ISBN 978-987-646-861-9
- Sal de sangres en incendio, Córdoba: Alción 2020. ISBN 978-987-646-904-3
- Sal de sangres en sangre, Córdoba: Alción 2021. ISBN 978-987-646-943-2

=== Works in collaboration ===
- Nosotras, presas políticas. Obra colectiva de 112 prisioneras políticas entre 1974 y 1983. Alicia Kozameh, Blanca Becher, Mirta Clara, Silvia Echarte, Viviana Beguán, Nora Hilb et al. Prólogo: Inés Izaguirre. Buenos Aires: Editorial Nuestra América, 2006.

=== Editor of ===
- Caleidoscopio. La mujer en la mira. Selección y prólogo de Alicia Kozameh. Buenos Aires: Instituto Movilizador de Fondos Cooperativos (Colección Desde la gente), 2005.
- Caleidoscopio 2. Inmigrantes en la mira. Selección de textos, entrevistas y prólogo de Alicia Kozameh. Buenos Aires: Instituto Movilizador de Fondos Cooperativos (Colección Desde la gente), 2006.

=== Translated Work ===
==== English ====
- Steps under Water. Translated by David E. Davis. Foreword by Saúl Sosnowski. Berkeley / Los Angeles / London: University of California Press, 1996. (= Pasos bajo el agua)
- 259 Leaps, the Last Immortal. Translated from the Spanish by Clare E. Sullivan, Introduction by Gwendolyn Díaz. San Antonio, Texas: Wings Press, 2006. (= 259 Saltos, uno inmortal)
- Ostrich Legs. A Novel by Alicia Kozameh. Translated from the Spanish by David E. Davis. San Antonio, TX: Wings Press, 2013 (= Patas de avestruz)
- Eni Furtado Has Never Stopped Running. Andrea Labinger, trans. San Antonio, TX: Wings Press, 2014 (= Eni Furtado no ha dejado de correr)

==== French ====
- Main en vol. Traduit de l’espagnol (Argentine) par Anne-Claire Huby. Lyon, France: L’atelier du tilde, 2011. (= Mano en vuelo).
- Esquisse des hauteurs (Récit). Traduit de l’espagnol (Argentine) par Anne-Claire Huby. Lyon, France: L’atelier du tilde, 2011. (= „Bosquejo de alturas“)
- 259 sauts, un immortel. Traduit de l’espagnol (Argentine) par Anne-Claire Huby. Lyon: Zinnia Éditions, 2013 (= 259 saltos, uno inmortal)
- La peau même en offrande. Traduit de l’espagnol (Argentine) par Anne-Claire Huby. Lyon: Zinnia Éditions, 2013 (= Ofrenda de propia piel)
- Pattes d’autruche. Traduit de l’espagnol (Argentine) par Anne-Claire Huby. Lyon: Zinnia Éditions, 2014 (= Patas de avestruz)

==== German ====
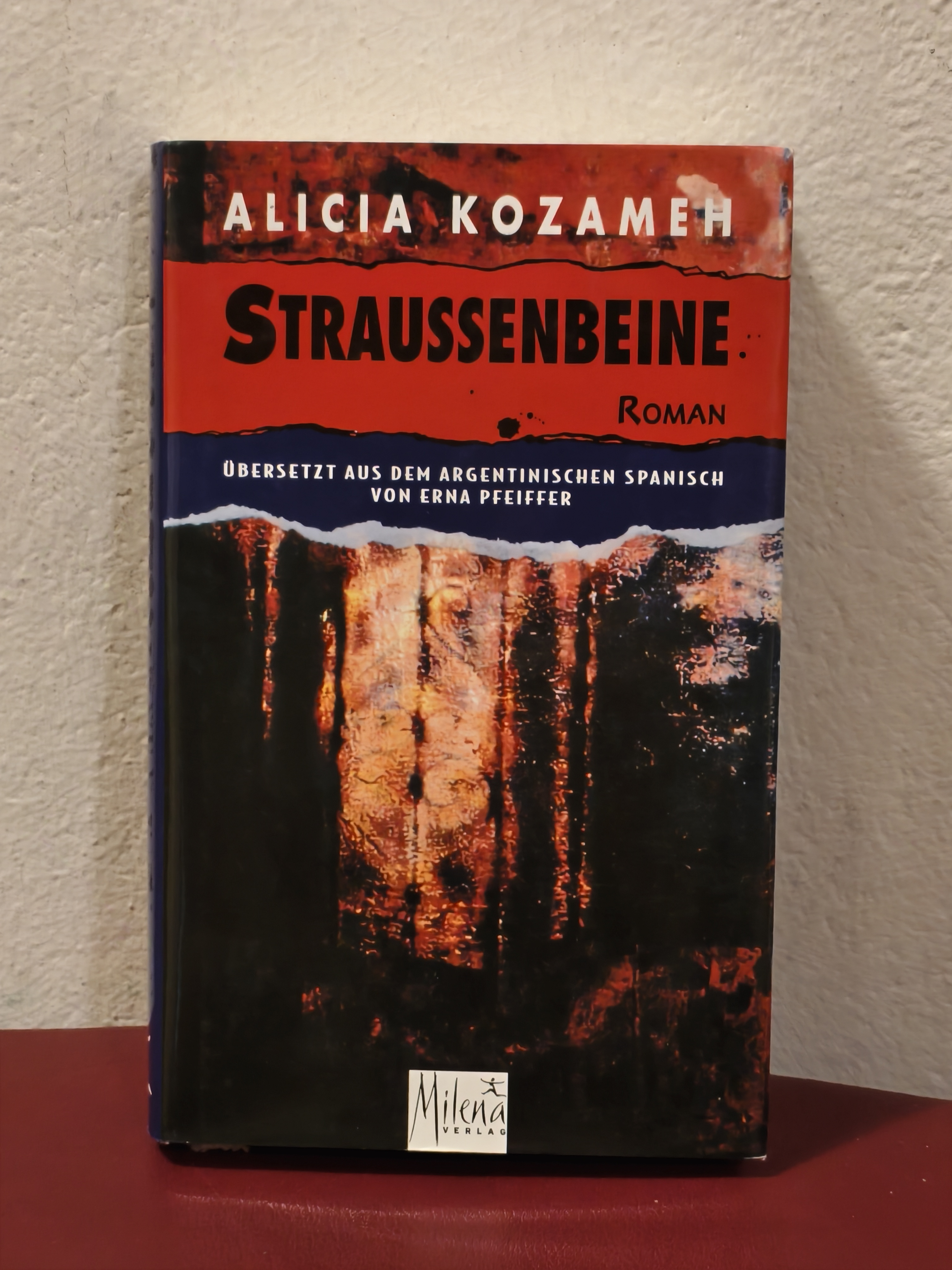
Alicia Kozameh: Straussenbeine

- Straußenbeine. Roman. Aus dem argentinischen Spanisch von Erna Pfeiffer. Wien: Milena Verlag, 1997. (= Patas de avestruz)
- Schritte unter Wasser. Roman. Aus dem argentinischen Spanisch von Erna Pfeiffer, mit einem Nachwort von Saúl Sosnowski. Wien: Milena Verlag, 1999. (= Pasos bajo el agua)
- 259 Sprünge (Salto Immortale inbegriffen). Aus dem argentinischen Spanisch von Erna Pfeiffer. Wien: Löcker Verlag, 2017. (= 259 saltos, uno inmortal)

==== Italian ====
- Passi sotto l’acqua. Brunilde Scalabrini, trad. Postfazione di Emilia Perassi. Milán: et al./EDIZIONI, 2013 (= Pasos bajo el agua).
