= Patricia Ratto =

Argentine teacher and writer (born 1962)

Patricia Ratto (born 1962) is an Argentine teacher and writer who lives and works in Tandil, a town in southern Buenos Aires Province. She has written and published the following novels: Pequeños hombres blancos (Adriana Hidalgo, 2006), Nudos (Adriana Hidalgo, 2008), and Trasfondo (Adriana Hidalgo, 2012).

== Writing ==
Pequeños hombres blancos is the tale of a provincial teacher, set during the Argentine dictatorship of the 1970s. The heroine of Nudos is a social worker whose job opens onto a whole set of stories from figures on the margins of Argentine society. Tandil's El Eco described it as "exceed[ing] all expectations."

But Ratto is probably best known for Trasfondo, a fictional reconstruction of the submarine the ARA San Luis's contribution to the Falklands War. For many weeks, after the sinking of the General Belgrano and the subsequent return of the Argentine fleet to port, the San Luis was the only Argentine ship at sea in the war zone. Ratto portrays the isolation of the submarine and its crew, who are almost perpetually submerged and see little more than fog on the few occasions they surface. Ultimately it is revealed that the novel's narrator, a sailor who seems to interact little with his crewmates, has died before the submarine even sets sail. As he ponders as one point in the narrative: "Can one really die and not know it?"

Writing in La Nación, Osvaldo Quiroga commends Ratto's prose style for its "rare beauty and admirable precision." The critic Martín Kohan, meanwhile, compares Trasfondo to Fogwill's celebrated Malvinas Requiem (Los pichiciegos), observing that while "Fogwill's pichiciegos [. . .] see ghosts briefly, Ratto's sailors, in their submarine war, are ghosts throughout."

== List of works ==
- Ratto, Patricia (2006), Pequeños hombres blancos, Buenos Aires: Adriana Hidalgo, ISBN 9789871156481.
- Ratto, Patricia (2008), Nudos, Buenos Aires: Adriana Hidalgo, ISBN 9789871156917.
- Ratto, Patricia (2012), Trasfondo, Buenos Aires: Adriana Hidalgo, ISBN 9788492857661.

== Sources ==
- Kohan, Martín (2014), El país de la guerra, Buenos Aires: Eterna Cadencia, ISBN 9789877120547.
- Ratto, Patricia (2012), Trasfondo, Buenos Aires: Adriana Hidalgo, ISBN 9788492857661.
