= Delfina Molina y Vedia =

Argentine chemist, writer and painter

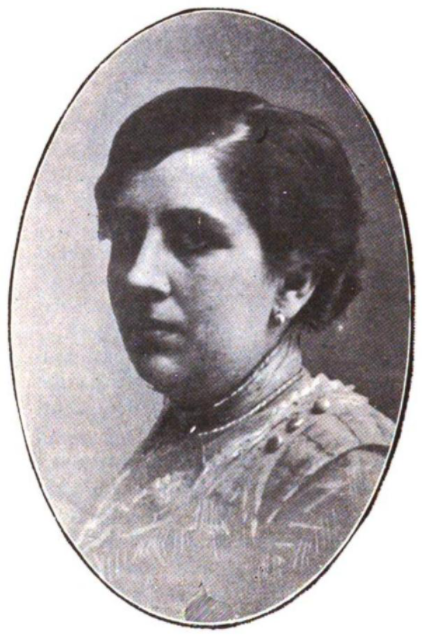
- Born: Delfina Manuela Molina y Vedia; 7 March 1879; Buenos Aires, Argentina
- Died: 22 January 1961 (aged 81)
- Education: University of Buenos Aires
- Occupations: Chemist, writer, teacher, painter, singer
- Spouse: René Bastianini (m. 1906)
- Children: 3

Delfina Manuela Molina y Vedia de Bastianini (7 March 1879 – 22 January 1961) was an Argentine chemist, writer, teacher, painter, and singer. She was the first woman to graduate from the Faculty of Exact and Natural Sciences at the University of Buenos Aires (UBA).

== Career ==
Delfina Molina y Vedia was born in Buenos Aires on 7 March 1879, the daughter of Octavio J. Molina and Manuela de Vedia. She earned a licentiate from the UBA in 1905, and obtained the title of Doctor in Chemistry from its Faculty of Exact and Natural Sciences in 1906, becoming the first woman to do so. In 1917, she earned a degree as a secondary school teacher in letters and sciences. After graduating, she developed her vocation for art, philosophy, and teaching. She created works in the fields of plastic arts, literature, and lyrical singing. She wrote several books, and recounted her memoirs in one of them, A redrotiempo, dedicating a chapter to her college years.

Her writings appeared in various publications of the time, such as Caras y Caretas, La Nación, Plus Ultra, El Hogar, Atlántida, Renacimiento, and Nosotros. She also published the poetry collections Por gracia de amor (1923) and Delfíneas (1933), the memoir A redrotiempo, and works of a more academic nature, such as Por Nuestro lengua (1935) and Cuestiones lingusticas de América (1936).

She was a member of the Ateneo Hispano-Americano, the Argentine Writers' Society, the Argentine Federation of University Women, and the Wagnerian Association. In 1935, she founded the Argentine Society of Linguistic Studies.

== Personal life ==
She was the niece of Luis A. Huergo, the first engineer to earn a degree at the UBA, who was dean of the Faculty of Exact, Physical and Natural Sciences and designer of prominent engineering projects related to the country's ports.

She married grammatologist René Bastianini in 1906. Their three children all became artists.

She maintained a long epistolary correspondence with Spanish writer Miguel de Unamuno. Over time, her letters began to take on a romantic, even obsessive character. Though her feelings for him were not reciprocated, they caused some friction with her husband and children.

Delfina Molina y Vedia died from Parkinson's disease on 22 January 1961.
