= Raymunda Torres y Quiroga =

Argentine writer and women's rights activist

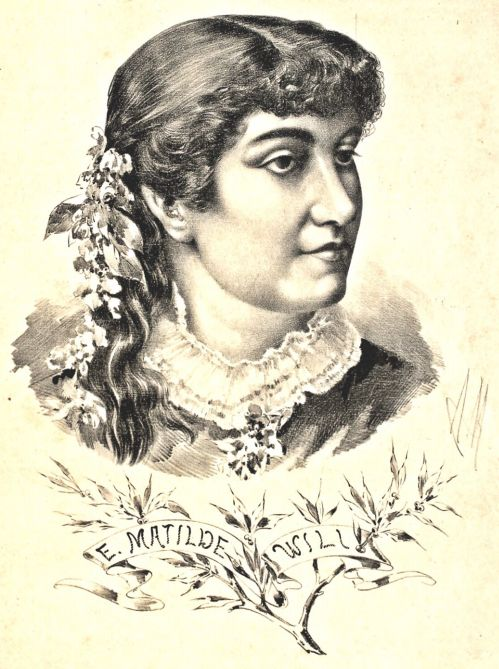
Raymunda Torres y Quiroga as Matilde Elena Willy in El Indiscreto, issue 22

Raymunda Torres y Quiroga (pen names, Madre Selva, Elena Matilde Wili, Matilde Elena Wili, Matilde Elena Wuili, Leopoldo, Luciérnaga, Estela and Celeste) was an Argentine writer and women's rights activist. She defended access to education and the emancipation of women in Argentina.

== Biography ==
Raymunda Torres y Quiroga was born in Entre Ríos Province. No biographical data is known about her.

She frequently used pseudonyms to sign her articles, including "Madre Selva", which she used to publish in El correo de las niñas from 1877.

Through the magazine, La Alborada Literaria del Plata, she had a confrontation regarding her published writings with Josefina Pelliza de Sagasta who opposed Torres y Quiroga's ideas about education and the position that women should adopt in society.

In El Indiscreto, a newspaper published in Montevideo, Torres y Quiroga published writings under the pseudonym "Elena Matilde Wili" and sometimes "Matilde Elena Wili" but she also used, "Leopoldo", "Luciérnaga", "Estela", and "Celeste". Under the pseudonym "Matilde Elena Wuili" or "Wili", she published stories with her ideas about the emancipation of women, and included the topic of femicide. Through tales of the fantasy genre published in La Ondina del Plata and in El Álbum del Hogar, she wrote about women and the femicide to which they were subjected.

== Selected works ==
- Entretenimientos literarios of Matilde Elena Wili. Buenos Aires: Imprenta Colón, 1884.
- Historias inverosímiles of Raimunda Torres y Quiroga. Temperley: Train in Motion, 2014.
- Cecilia, short story published in El Indiscreto
