= Clotilde González de Fernández =

Argentine educator, piano teacher and writer

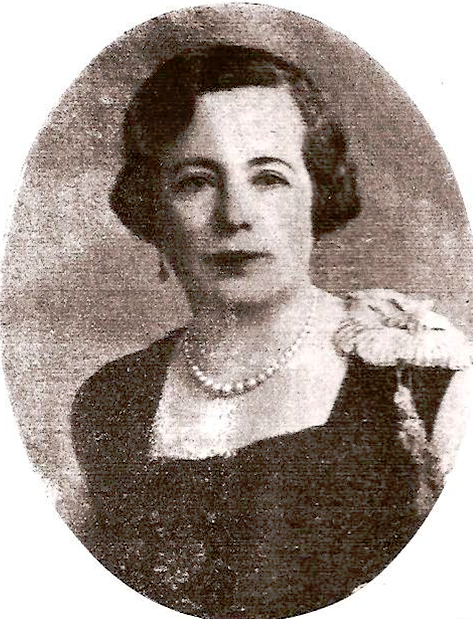
Clotilde M. González de Fernández

Clotilde González de Fernández (née Clotilde Mercedes González; married name Clotilde Mercedes González de Fernández Ramos; September 24, 1880 – February 28, 1935) was an Argentine educator, piano teacher, and writer. She was a pioneer of education in Misiones Province, having taken the initiative to establish the first secondary schools of the then "Territorio Nacional de Misiones". She was the promoter of a popular movement that achieved through the National State the creation of the normal schools in 1909, the National School in 1917, the School of Arts and Crafts in 1924, and the first musical institute in 1918, in Posadas.

== Biography ==
González was born on September 24, 1880, in Santo Tomé, Corrientes Province, about 160 kilometres (99 mi) from Posadas, Misiones Province. As a young adult, she married the writer, researcher and correspondent for the newspapers La Nación and La Prensa, the Spaniard Ildefonso Raimundo Fernández Ramos, with whom she had three children. During her life, González de Fernández worked as a teacher and piano teacher in primary schools and later as a history and geography teacher in the city's secondary schools, which she had established. Together with her husband, they managed to bring from France the manuscripts of Aimé Bonpland on his research carried out in the United States, which were translated and donated to the Bernardino Rivadavia Natural Sciences Argentine Museum.

In 1906, she served as a member of the commission of the library of School No. 1, carrying out at the same time the necessary steps to achieve the creation of a public library, which would later be known as the Biblioteca Popular Posadas. She also published works regarding the origins of the city of Posadas and an anthology of American literature.

She died in Posadas, Misiones, February 28, 1935.

== Selected works ==
- Territorios Nacionales: el idioma nacional (1901)
- Antología hispanoamericana (1906)
- Plano gráfico y estadístico de la Ciudad de Posadas (1910)
- Reseña Histórica de la ciudad de Posadas 1872—18 de octubre—1922 (1922)
