= Elvira Orphée =

Argentine writer (1922–2018)

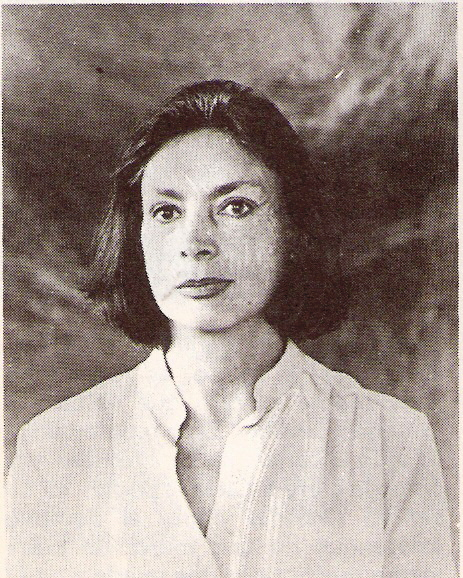
- Orphée in 1981
- Born: May 29, 1922; San Miguel de Tucumán, Argentina
- Died: April 26, 2018 (aged 95); Buenos Aires, Argentina
- Education: University of Buenos Aires; University of Paris
- Occupations: Novelist; short story writer
- Writing career
- Notable works: Aire tan dulce (1966); En el fondo (1969)
- Notable awards: Guggenheim Fellowship (1988)

Elvira Amanda Orphée (22 May 1922 in San Miguel de Tucumán – 26 April 2018) was an Argentine writer.

== Biography ==
Elvira Orphée was born in San Miguel de Tucumán. Her father was a chemist of Greek origin, and her mother was a teacher. Often ill as a child, she learned to write early. After attending a convent school, she left aged sixteen for Buenos Aires after her mother died. She studied literature at the University of Buenos Aires and at the Sorbonne in Paris.

Over the course of her life, Orphée lived in France, Italy, Spain and Venezuela. She married artist Miguel Ocampo, the nephew of Victoria Ocampo, in Paris but divorced him after she returned to Argentina. She published her first novel Dos veranos (Two summers) in 1956.

Orphée has published short stories and articles in various publications such as El Tiempo, Revista de Occidente, Asomante, Cuadernos, Razon and Zona Franca e Imagen.

She was awarded a Guggenheim Fellowship in Creative Arts in 1988.

== Selected works ==
=== Novels ===
- Dos veranos, 1956
- Uno, 1961, Honourable mention in the Fahril Editorial Literary Contest
- Aire tan dulce (Air so sweet), 1966, second prize in the Municipality of Buenos Aires
- En el fondo, 1969, first prize in the Municipality of Buenos Aires
- La última conquista de El Ángel (El Angel's Last Conquest) (1984)
- La muerte y los desencuentros (Death and missteps), novel (1990), received the Regional Prize
- Basura y luna, 1996

=== Story Collections ===
- Su demonio preferido, 1973
- Las viejas fantasiosas, 1981
- Ciego del cielo (Heavenly Blind), 1991
