= Josefina Passadori =

Italian-Argentine academic and writer (1900–1987)

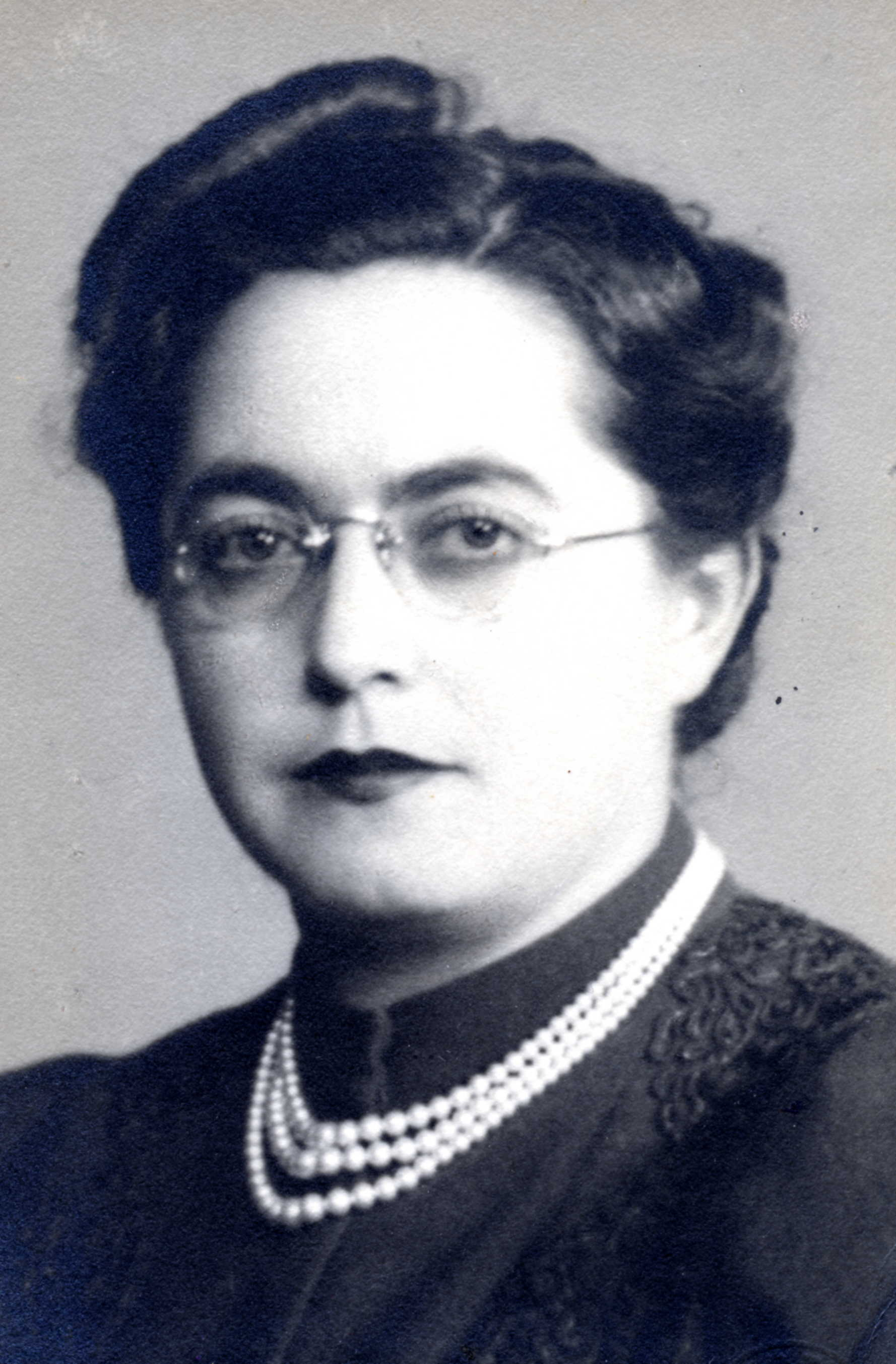
Josefina Passadori

Josefina Passadori (5 April 1900 – 13 December 1987) was an Italian-Argentine academic, educator, and writer. She published several textbooks as well as poetry under the pen name Fröken Thelma.

== Biography ==
Passadori was born in Mezzanino, Pavia, Italy, in 1900.

In 1922, she graduated from La Unidad Académica Escuela Normal Superior N° 1 Mary O. Graham in La Plata, where she taught for almost forty years. She was responsible for teaching subjects such as Spanish, Italian, Ancient History, American Geography, Argentine Geography, American Literature, Argentine Literature, and Argentine Culture.

She also worked for other schools, such as Escuela Normal Superior María Inmaculada in La Plata; Escuela Nº 18 del Consejo Escolar Nº14 in Buenos Aires; School of Journalism of the Universidad Nacional de La Plata; and the Universidad Popular Sarmiento, for which she was the President for several years.

At the age of twenty, she founded the first Latin American school cooperative, of which she was also the first president. She headed many other cultural institutions, including the Arts Society; she served as Education Undersecretary in the province of Buenos Aires.

In 1930, she was one of the survivors of the MV Monte Cervantes shipwreck, which ran aground near the Les Éclaireurs Lighthouse in Tierra del Fuego.

Passadori published hundreds of articles in El Argentino, El Día, and Revista del Suboficial; gave conferences; and sponsored the "Ediciones del Bosque", an organization which promoted and published intellectuals in Buenos Aires, including Raúl Amaral, María Dhialma Tiberti, and María de Villarino, among others. As an author of educational geography texts, she published more than 30 books, some in collaboration with other writers, exclusively under the Editorial Kapelusz imprint. Among her most notable works is the renowned Manual del Alumno, which was used for generations in Argentine primary schools.

Passadori died in San Isidro, Argentina, on 13 December 1987, aged 87.

== Works ==
- Elementos de geografía (1958)
- El universo y los países (1941)
- Geografía de América (1938)
- Geografía General y de Asia y Africa (1945)
- El Continente Americano (1939)
- El Mundo Actual (1955)
- El Universo y la Argentina (1939)
- Argentina (1939)
- Manual de Geografía Americana (1961)
- Nociones de Geografía Astronómica, General, y de Asia y Africa (1949)
- El territorio Argentino (1952)
- Geografía Universal (1944)
- Geografía Americana (1944)

== Sources ==
- Diccionario biográfico, C Signo Editorial Argentino, Buenos Aires, Argentina, 1954, p. 292
- Sosa de Newton, Lily, Diccionario biográfico de mujeres argentinas, Editorial Plus Ultra, Buenos Aires, Argentina, 1980, p. 344
