= Adelia Di Carlo =

Argentine writer and chronicler

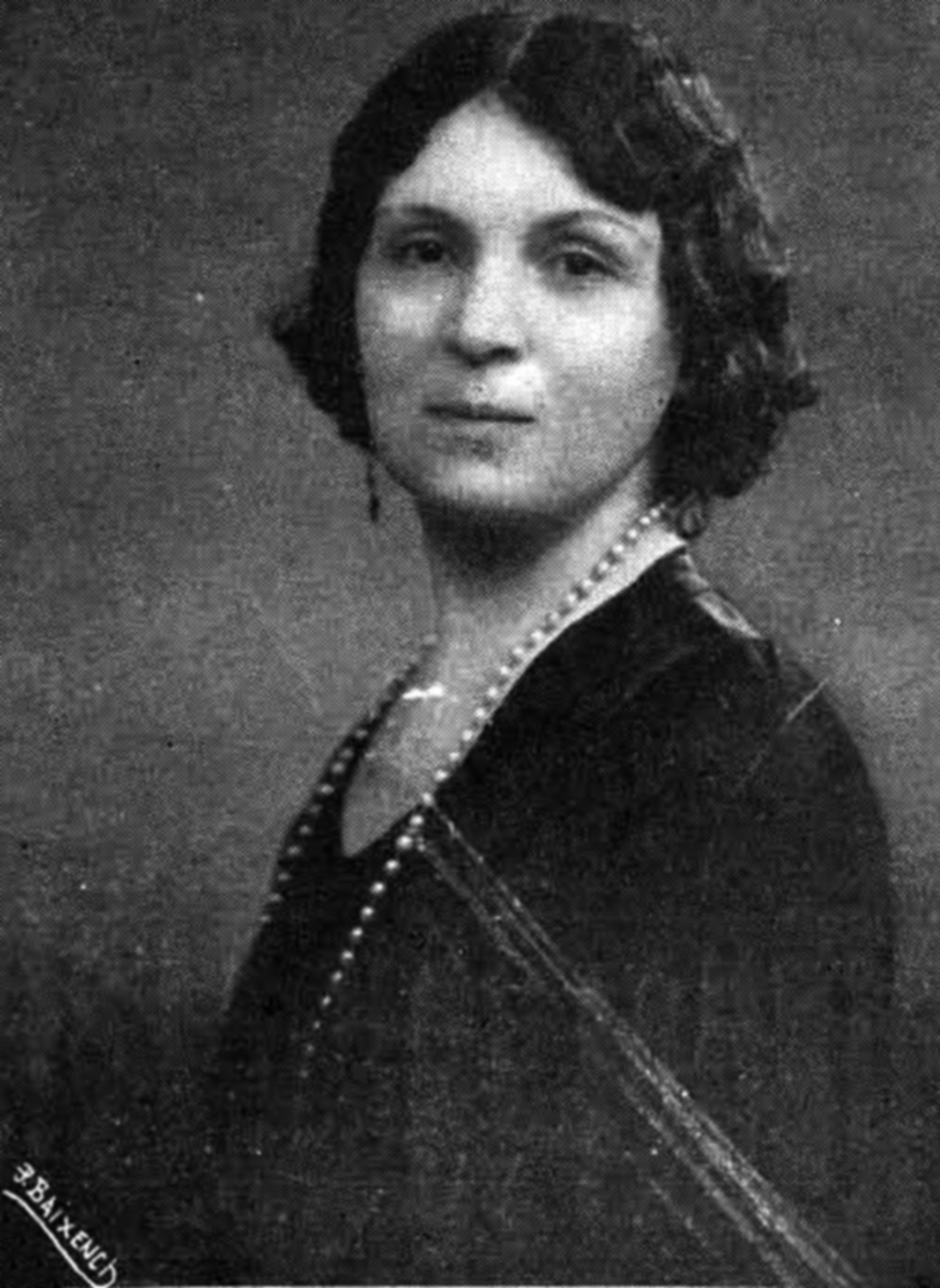
Adelia Di Carlo (1935)

Adelia Di Carlo (1883 – February 14, 1965) was an Argentine writer and chronicler linked to feminism during the 20th century. She also founded several organizations.

== Biography ==
Adelia Di Carlo was born in Buenos Aires in 1883. She graduated from the Normal School No. 1 and then worked as a teacher. Around 1907, she left teaching and dedicated herself to journalism writing as a social chronicler in the evening newspaper El Tiempo, directed by Carlos Vega Belgrano.

Julieta Lanteri's death in 1932, ruled an accident by the police, was called into question at the time by El Mundo writer, Di Carlo. The news daily published details of the incident, including the fact that the police report had had the driver's name and vehicle tags blotted out; that the man, David Klapenbach, was a member of the right-wing paramilitary group, the Argentine Patriotic League; and that Klapenbach himself had committed numerous murders. Di Carlo's home was ransacked by the Argentine Federal Police following the publication of these details.

In 1945, De Carlo promoted the "Exposicion Interamericana Del Libro Femenino", which received great attention. In the following year, she participated in the "Primer Salón del Poema Ilustrado". One of her most important works was the founding of the "Clorinda Matto de Turner Cultural Association", holding the presidency for more than forty years, till her death. She also founded the "Asociación de Docentes y Auxiliares de la Escuela Profesional de Mujeres". On November 26, 1958, she participated in the founding of the "Instituto Moreniano", which was centered on the works and ideas of Mariano Moreno.

De Carlo died in Buenos Aires, February 14, 1965.

== Works ==
- La canción de la aguja
- El hijo del guardabosque
- Astillas de sándalo (1934)
- En las viejas capillas (1940)
- Carta de amor (1948)
- En espera de la hora (1948)

=== Articles ===
- 1934. Gabriela Mistral los grandes valores femeninos de América
