= Juan Carlos Portantiero =

Argentine sociologist

- Born: 9 August 1934; Buenos Aires, Argentina
- Died: March 9, 2007; Buenos Aires, Argentina

Education
- Education: University of Buenos Aires

Philosophical work
- Institutions: University of Buenos Aires, Latin American Faculty of Social Sciences, Torcuato di Tella Institute
- Main interests: Peronism, cultural hegemony, democratic socialism

Juan Carlos Portantiero (9 August 1934 – 9 March 2007) was an Argentine sociologist.

He specialized in the study of the works of Antonio Gramsci. With José Aricó and other intellectuals, he was in charge of the magazine Pasado y Presente, which holds a critical view of Marxism.

Studies on the Origins of Peronism (Estudios sobre los Origenes del Peronismo in Spanish), published together with Miguel Murmis in 1970, is regarded as a classic work of Argentine sociology that has influenced several generations of scholars.

He graduated in Sociology in University of Buenos Aires, and went into exile during the last illegal military government (1976–1983) because of threats received. He moved into Mexico, where he founded the Controversia journal.

After the return of democracy (1983), he became one of the most respected Argentine scholars and had a direct influence on politics as an advisor to Unión Cívica Radical president Raúl Alfonsín and member of the advising team dubbed Grupo Esmeralda.

He served as dean of the University of Buenos Aires Faculty of Social Sciences from 1990 to 1998.

== Selected works ==
- Estudios sobre los orígenes del peronismo ("Studies on the Origins of Peronism", 1970), with Miguel Murmis
- Los orígenes de la sociología clásica ("Origins of Classical Sociology", 1978)
- Estudiantes y política en América Latina ("Students and Politics in Latin America", 1978)
- Estado y sociedad en el pensamiento clásico ("State and Society in the Classical Thinking", 1985)
- Ensayos sobre la transición democrática en la Argentina ("Essays on Argentina's Democratic Transition", 1987)
- Juan B. Justo, el patriarca socialista
