= Juana Dib =

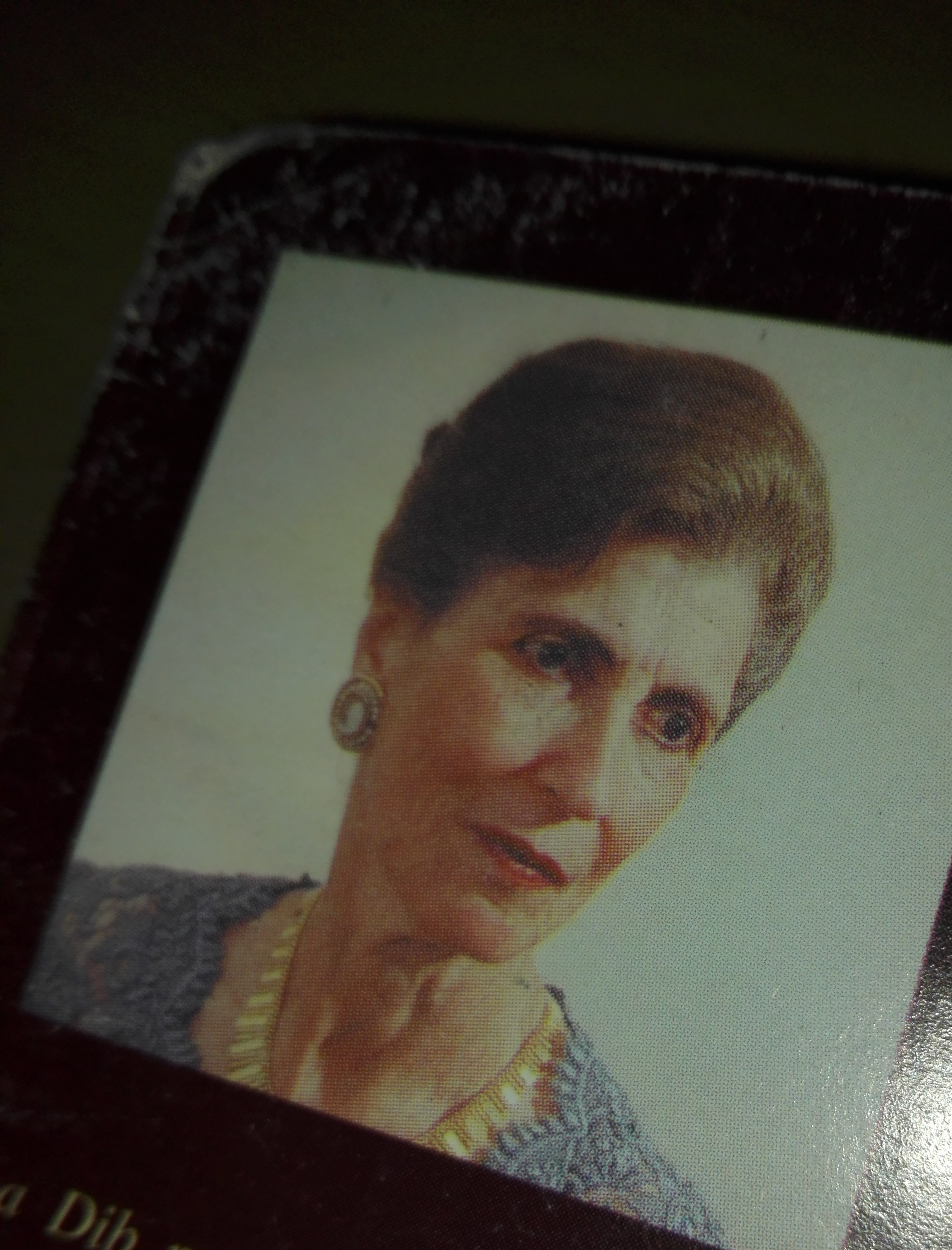
Juana Dib

Juana Dib (Salta City, August 2, 1924 - Salta City, August 29, 2015) was an Argentine poet, journalist, and teacher.

== Biography ==
The daughter of Syrian Greek Orthodox Christian parents from Tumin, in the Hama Governorate, she was the third of eleven siblings.

Trained as a teacher, Dib taught Spanish and administrative writing. Many of her students were immigrants and children of immigrants, whom she taught to speak and write in the Spanish language. She was a member of the Caja de Previsión Social de la Provincia, the Centro Salteño de Investigaciones de la Cultura Árabe, and the Federación de Entidades Argentino Árabes filial Salta. Much of her work was translated by Zaki Konsol, Juan Yacer, and Michael Nooman, and published in Syrian and Lebanese newspapers and magazines. After her death, the Syrian-Lebanese Union of Salta described her as "una excelsa poetisa, escritora y guía intelectual de la causa árabe" (an excellent poetess, writer and intellectual guide of the Arab cause).

== Awards and honours ==
- 1993, Premio del Concurso de Poesía para Autores Éditos de la Dirección Provincial de Cultura de Salta
- 2010, Premio del Concurso Provincial de Novela de la Secretaría de Cultura de la Provincia de Salta

== Selected works ==
- El milagro de una rosa (1 ed.). 1982.
- Las Doradas (1 ed.). Edición del Autor. 1989. ISBN 978-950-43-5057-6.
- Las Dos Vertientes (1 ed.). Gráfiker. 1993. ISBN 978-987-99003-9-0.
- La Mandragora (1 ed.). Ministerio de Educación de la Provincia de Salta. 1993. ISBN 978-987-99601-0-3.
- Las Invitadas (1 ed.). Del Robledal. 2000. ISBN 978-987-9364-08-6.
- El Páramo que clama (1 ed.). Del Robledal. 2001. ISBN 978-987-9364-15-4.
- Viajeros del Orontes (1 ed.). Ministerio de Educación de la Provincia de Salta. 2002. ISBN 978-987-98838-8-4.
- Poblada de Voces (1 ed.). Víctor Manuel Hanne Editor. 2008. ISBN 978-987-9140-82-6.
- Elegía a Palestina (1 ed.). Víctor Manuel Hanne Editor. 2009. ISBN 978-987-1578-13-9.
- Flores naturales (1 ed.). Ministerio de Educación de la Provincia de Salta. 2010. ISBN 978-987-1196-65-4.
- Hierro Dulce (1 ed.). Víctor Manuel Hanne Editor. 2014. ISBN 978-987-1933-61-7.
- Destino - Argentina (1 ed.). Fondo Editorial Secretaría de Cultura de la Provincia de Salta. 2015. ISBN 978-987-1929-37-5. (posthumous).

== See also ==
- Syrian Argentines
