= Alicia Dujovne Ortiz =

Argentine journalist and author

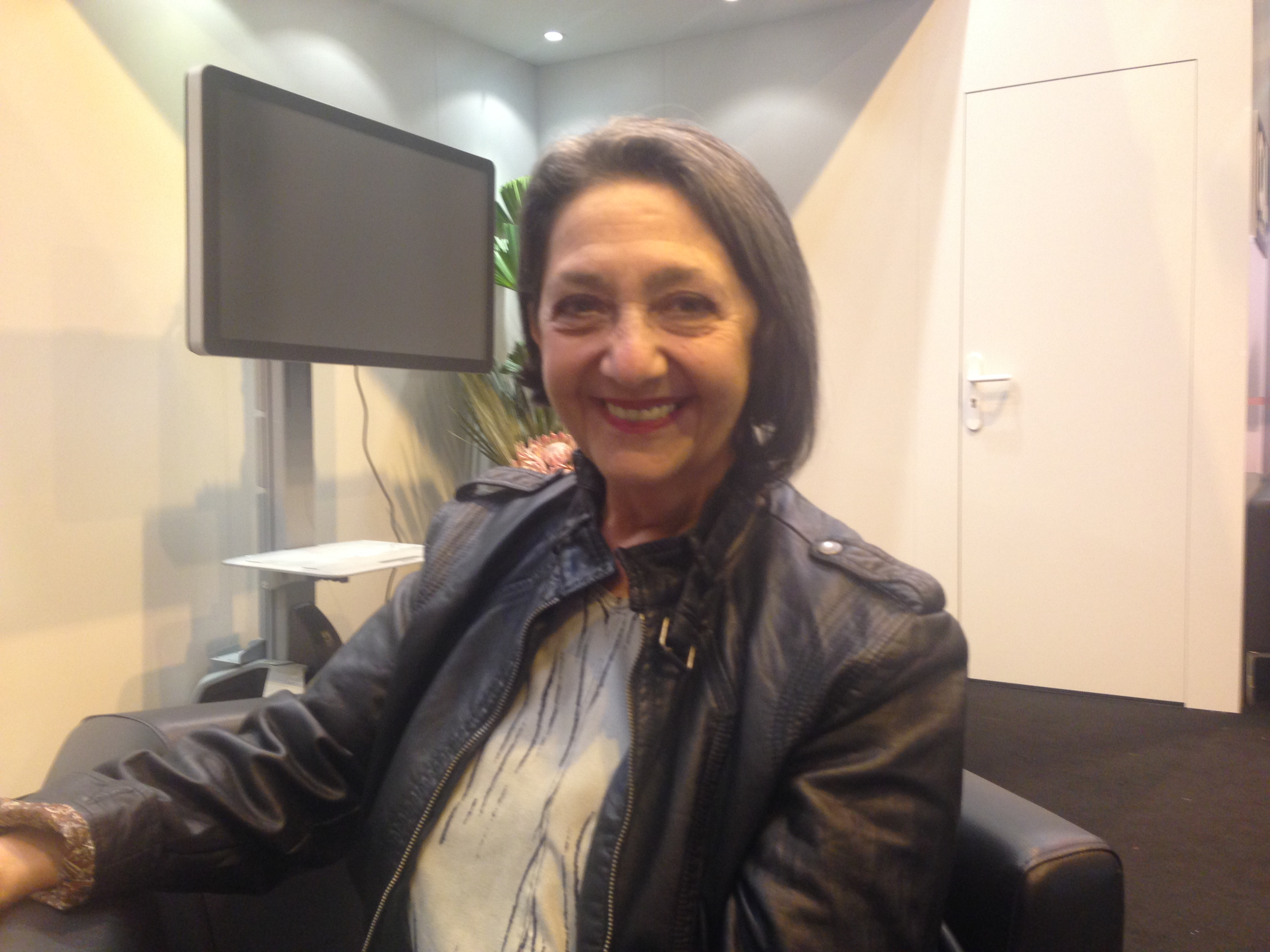
- Alicia Dujovne Ortiz in 2014
- Born: 1940 (age 85–86); Buenos Aires, Argentina
- Occupations: journalist and author

Alicia Dujovne Ortiz (born in 1940) is an Argentine journalist and author.

== Biography ==
Dujovne Ortiz was born in Buenos Aires. She is Jewish. She earned a degree in Philosophy and Letters from the University of Buenos Aires and contributed to numerous Argentine periodicals. Forced into exile by the military dictatorship in 1978, she relocated to Paris. She contributed to Le Monde and became a literary adviser to the Gallimard publishing house. She received a fellowship from the Simon Guggenheim Foundation in 1986 and authored biographies on María Elena Walsh (1979), Diego Maradona (1993), and Eva Perón (1995). She received a Konex Award, the highest recognition in the Argentine cultural realm, for her career. Dujovne Ortiz lives in Toulouse, and her most recent books include El Arbol de la Gitana and Mireya.

== Awards ==
- 1986 John Simon Guggenheim
- 2004 and 2014 Premio Konex
- 2015 Premio Platino Fundación Konex

== Selected works ==
Biographies

- El camarada Carlos. Buenos Aires: Aguilar, 2007.
- Maradona soy yo. Buenos Aires: Emecé, 1994.
- Evita Perón. La biografía („Eva Perón“). Buenos Aires: Aguilar, 1995.
- María Elena Walsh. Madrid: Júcar, 1979.

Poems

- Mapa del olivado tesoro. Buenos Aires: Editorial Kraft, 1969.
- Orejas invisibles para el rumor de nuestros pasos. Buenos Aires: Editorial Bibliográfica Omeba, 1967.
- Recetas, florecillas y otros contentos. Buenos Aires: Editorial Rayuela, 1973.

Novels

- El agujero en la tierra. Novela. Caracas: Monte Ávila, 1980.
- Anita cubierta de arena. Novela. Buenos Aires: Aguilar, 2003.
- El árbol de la gitana. Novela. Buenos Aires: Alfaguara, 1997.
- El buzón de la esquina. Novela. Buenos Aires: Calicanto, 1977.
- Die tangofarbene Frau. Roman („Mireya“). Aufbau-Verlag, Berlin 2001, ISBN 3-7466-1736-7.
- La muñeca rusa. Novela. Buenos Aires: Alfaguara, 2009.
- Las perlas rojas. Novela. Buenos Aires: Aguilar, 2005.
- Un corazón tan recio. Buenos Aires: Alfaguara, 2011.
- La Madama. Buenos Aires, Emecé, 2014.
- La más agraciada. Buenos Aires: Emecé, 2015.

== See also ==
- Lists of writers
