= Alicia Steimberg =

Argentine novelist (1933–2012)

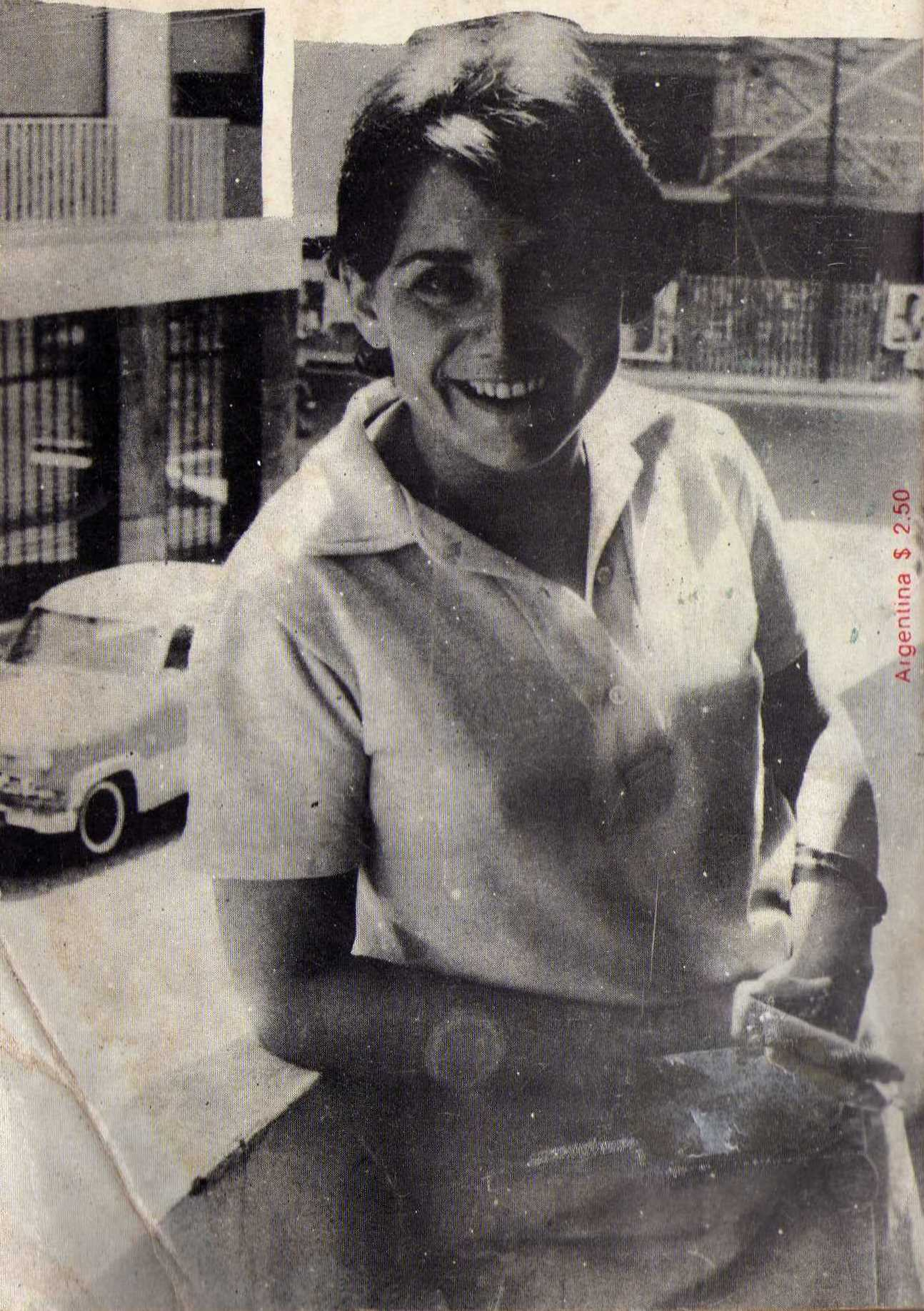
Alicia Steimberg

Alicia Steimberg (July 18, 1933 – June 16, 2012) was an Argentine novelist.

== Biography ==
The daughter of Gregorio Steimberg and Luisa Imas, both natives of Argentina of East European (Romanian, Ukrainian and Russian) descent, she was born in Buenos Aires and was educated at the Instituto Nacional del Profesorado. Her father, a teacher, died when she was eight.

She published her first novel Musicians and Watchmakers (Músicos y relojeros) in 1971. This was followed by Madwoman 101 (La loca 101) in 1973. In 1983, she published a collection of short stories Just Like Every Morning (Como todas las mañanas). In 1992, her novel Call Me Magdalena (Cuando digo Magdalena) won the Premio Planeta Biblioteca del Sur prize. Injected with a dose of humour, her work draws from her own life experiences and daily life in urban Argentina.

Despite a favourable reception from critics, Steimberg found it necessary to supplement her income by translation work and giving literary workshops. She was director of the books section of the Argentine Secretariate of Culture from 1995 to 1997.

Despite her Jewish heritage, she had little direct interaction with the local Jewish community. At times, she compares Judaism unfavourably with Catholicism in her work.

She was married twice: first to Abraham Sokolowicz in 1957 and then to Tito Svidler in 1968. Svidler died of cancer in 1990.

Steimberg died in Buenos Aires at the age of 78 after suffering a heart attack.

Her brother Oscar is a noted semiologist.
