= Marcelina Almeida =

Argentine-born Uruguayan writer

Marcelina Almeida (c. 1830 – 1880), was an Argentine-born Uruguayan writer living in Montevideo, since she was young. Almeida used the pseudonyms Abel and Reine mi bella acclamada (anagram of her full name) to sign her contributions in publications of the time. Her work, Por una fortuna una cruz, is considered the first Uruguayan feminist novel.

== Biography ==
Marcelina Almeida Abel was born in Argentina, ca. 1830. (Note: The exact dates of her birth and death are unknown.) In a poem dedicated to Almeida, Francisco Acuña de Figueroa describes her as Uruguayan by adoption, born in Argentina.

Almeida's romantic novel Por una fortuna una cruz was published in Montevideo in 1860. Its central theme is "the forced marriage of a fifteen-year-old girl with a twenty-five-year-old man". The work generated an intense debate in the Montevideo press of the time. Not only was the literary quality of it discussed, but also the fact that a woman writer questioned the institution of marriage. Almeida was the target of virulent personal attacks, many under pseudonyms. Virginia Cánova, a researcher based in Sweden, explains that "in her adherence to the liberal feminism of the Enlightenment and cultural feminism, the author develops the theme of the lack of rights of women, of their eternal minority protected by men, particularly the forced marriage negotiated by the father of the young woman. She presents different situations of oppression caused by the permanent minority of the woman".

In 1991, Cánova found a copy of the novel in the National Library of Uruguay, tracing works that did not appear in Uruguayan literary history. The finding prompted a limited reissue of the work, thanks to an agreement between the National Library of Uruguay and the Department of Literature of the University of Gothenburg, which includes the study "The origins of feminism in Uruguay." In this study, Cánova concludes that "(...) we can locate the origins of the feminist movement in the early stages of the 19th century and not as had been affirmed until now, in the early 20th century; and, as for female writers, we already see that María Eugenia Vaz Ferreira and Delmira Agustini were not the precursors, but Marcelina Almeida and others, like Adela Correge with her work Tula y Elena o sea el orgullo y la modestia (1885)". 8

Almeida also published poems, a short story, and articles during the period of 1860-61 in the Semanario Uruguayo and poems, between 1862 and 1863, in the literary magazine La Aurora de Montevideo.

Almeida died ca. 1880.
