= Poldy Bird =

Argentine writer and poet (1941–2018)

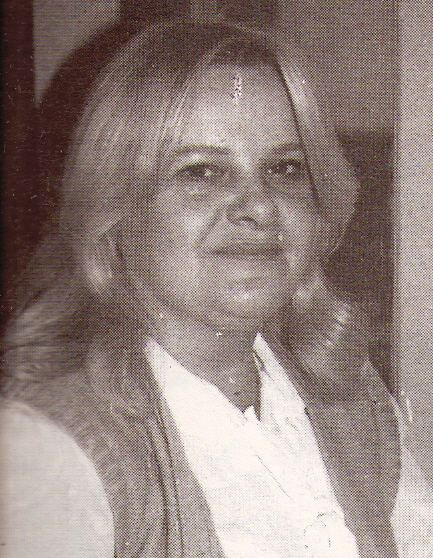
Poldy Bird

Poldy Bird (16 December 1941 – 1 June 2018) was an Argentine writer and poet who contributed to several newspapers in Argentina and around the world.

== Life and works ==
She was born in Paraná, in the province of Entre Ríos, Argentina, but as a girl she lived in Buenos Aires. On 10 August 1949, when she was eight years old, her mother, Leopoldina Lichtschein, also a writer and poet, died in a train accident. This tragic episode marked Bird's life, but also signaled her destiny as a writer.

At the age of thirteen she won a poetry contest. At the age of sixteen, she had already published her first short story, and the following year she began to publish, in a professional way, poems and texts in important magazines, both for Argentina and the world. Apart from producing texts aimed at children and young people, she worked as the director of the magazine Vosotras, which she transformed into a well-known magazine for womanly publications. Bird was awarded several international prizes, such as the Santa Clara de Asís and the Premio Mundial Consagración de la Literatura.

Among her most famous texts are Cuentos para Verónica (in honor of her first daughter), Cuentos para leer sin rimel, Nuevos cuentos para Verónica, and Cuentos con niebla. Regarding the first book Cuentos para Verónica, some sources say that it is one of the most sold Argentine publications, after Martín Fierro, with a record of two million books sold just in Argentina; purportedly the first Argentine book to be translated into Japanese.

During the later years of her life, Poldy Bird worked for several media outlets, such as the Argentine magazine Única and Radio Miami in the U.S.

== See also ==
- Lists of writers
