= Emma de Cartosio =

Argentine writer, poet, storyteller, essayist and teacher

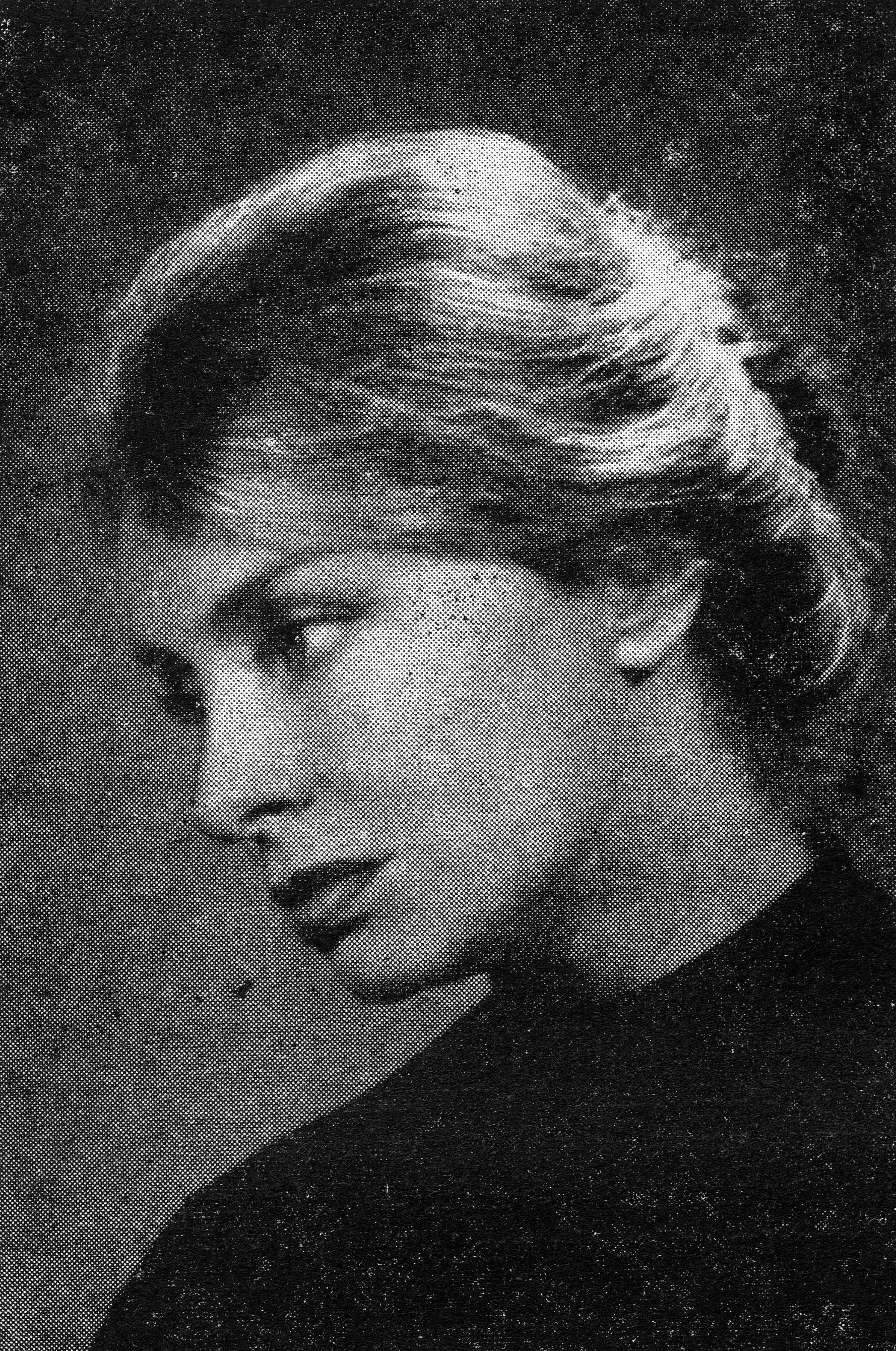
- Born: 1928; Concepción del Uruguay
- Died: 2013 (aged 84–85)
- Writing career
- Genre: Poetry

Emma de Cartosio (1928–2013) was an Argentine writer, poet, storyteller, essayist and teacher. The Emma de Cartosio poetry contest was established in Entre Ríos Province in 2015.

== Biography ==
Cartosio was born in Concepción del Uruguay, Entre Ríos Province. She graduated from the Faculty of Philosophy and Educational Sciences of the National University of La Plata.

In Argentina, Cartosio is largely recognized for her poetry. In 1963, she became a Fellow of the Instituto de Cultura Hispánica, Madrid. She studied contemporary Spanish poetry and published articles on the subject in several of the main newspapers in Argentina and Spain.

From 1965-69, she lived in Paris. She lectured on literature in general, but in particular, poetry in Latin American countries and in the interior of Argentina. A tireless traveler, Cartosio visited Europe, Africa, the Middle East and numerous Latin American countries, writing chronicles of her travels for the newspaper La Nación and others. Though she was mainly a Spanish language writer, she also wrote in French a book of stories and for that, she can be considered a francophone writer as well.

She died on October 25, 2013, at the age of 91. Her remains were cremated on October 30, 2013, as was her wish.

== Selected works ==
- Madura soledad, Buenos Aires : Peuser, 1948. OCLC 948875648
- Antes de tiempo, 1950.
- Cuentos del ángel que bien guarda, 1958.
- El Arenal perdido, Buenos Aires : Edit. Losada, S.A. 1958. OCLC 492497243
- Elegías analfabetas, 1960.
- Tonticanciones para Grillito, 1962.
- La Lenta mirada, Rialp S.A. 1964. OCLC 491864689
- En La Luz de París, Buenos Aires: Hachette, 1967. OCLC 461808490
- Cuando el sol selle las bocas, 1968.
- Contes et récits de La Pampa, 1971.
- Cuentos para la niña del retrato, 1973.
- Cuentos del perdido camino, 1976.
- Automarginada, 1980.
- Allá Tiempo y hace lejos, Buenos Aires: Corregidor 1993. ISBN 9789500506595, OCLC 463781941

== Awards ==
- Faja de Honor de la SADE (Sociedad Argentina de Escritores ), Argentina, 1948.
- Fondo Nacional de las Artes, Argentina, 1962.
- Premio Accessit Leopoldo Panero, España, 1967.
- Fondo Nacional de las Artes, Argentina, 1968.
- Pluma de Plata, Pen Club Internacional de Buenos Aires, Argentina, 1980.
- La Fleur de Laure, Francia, 1980.
- Premio Dupuytren, Argentina, 1980.
- Faja de Honor de la Sade (Sociedad Argentina de Escritores), Argentina, 1993.
- Premio Trayectoria, Gente de Letras de Buenos Aires, Argentina, 2000.

== Bibliography ==
- Provincias y Poesía, Nicolás Cócaro, Buenos Aires, Ediciones Culturales Argentinas, Ministerio de Educación y Justicia, Dirección General de Cultura, 1961.
- Selección Poética femenina 1940-1960, Marta Giménez Pastor y José Daniel Viacava, Buenos Aires, Ediciones Culturales Argentinas, Ministerio de Educación y Justicia, Dirección General de Cultura, 1965.
- Diccionario Biográfico de Mujeres Argentinas, Lily Sosa de Newton, Buenos Aires, Plus Ultra, 1980.
