= Florida group =

The Florida group (Sp.: grupo Florida) was an avant-garde literary-artistic group created in the 1920s in Buenos Aires, known by their embracing slogan "art for art's sake". The name refers to Florida Street, the location of a favored meeting point, the Richmond tea room.

The group was identified with the magazines Proa and Martín Fierro, the latter named after the long poem Martín Fierro, generally considered the greatest work of nineteenth-century Argentine literature. The group is also often referred to as the Martín Fierro group (Sp. "grupo Martín Fierro").

== Members ==
Among the best-known members of the Florida group were Oliverio Girondo, Norah Lange, Ricardo Güiraldes, Norah Borges, Péle Pastorino, Francisco Luis Bernárdez, Leopoldo Marechal, Conrado Nalé Roxlo, and Raúl González Tuñón.

Güiraldes was something of a father figure to many Florida members; already a major figure, he spent the 1920s writing his masterpiece Don Segundo Sombra and studying Hindu philosophy. He died in 1927, while planning a trip to India.

Nicolás Olivari, who co-founded the more political Boedo group, later became a member of the Florida group. The fiercely independent Roberto Arlt met with both groups on an irregular basis, but committed to none.

== Tendencies ==
Eventually, the group evolved into two branches, the Florida meeting in Downtown Buenos Aires at the Galeria Pacifico, with an artistic and literary agenda following feminist approach, and the Boedo meeting in the Offshores of the city at the futbol stadium of Club Atletico San Lorenzo, with predominantly male attendants with a socio-political agenda following an avant-garde labour approach.

Jorge Luis Borges was not a regular in Florida meetings, but was a frequent contributor to Proa and Martín Fierro. Actually, Borges claimed that the entire Florida-Boedo rivalry was a pointless imitation of European fashions and that he should indeed belong to Boedo because of geography (he lived at that time in Bulnes Street, the name Boedo Street takes after it crosses Rivadavia Avenue).

Arturo Cancela suggested in a letter to Martín Fierro that both sides merge under the common name of "Schools of Floredo street" and name Manuel Gálvez as president, as he lived on Pueyrredón street, equidistant from both groups. By 1930, all the involved parties had concluded that the perceived rivalry was no longer an issue. Girondo (for Florida) and Castelnuovo (for Boedo) wrote newspaper articles to that effect.

== Members' prosecution: military coup & the Peronist Party ==
After the 1930 military coup that launched the "Infamous Decade", the Florida constituency gravitated towards Victoria Ocampo's Sur magazine, which thrived in spite of the ever-deteriorating state of Argentine politics — until the advent of Peronism in 1945.

During the 1960s and 1970s, left-wing and Peronist Argentine commentators identified "the Florida Group" to be a Liberalist Euro-centered movement mainly following the British and French avant-garde, cataloguing it with many of the perceived illnesses of Argentine society such as ignoring the aspirations and culture of the lower classes (which Peronism would articulate), looking towards Europe for inspiration, and being out of touch with any kind of productive work. González Tuñón alone was excepted from this treatment, because of the social themes of his poetry.
