= Confitería Richmond =

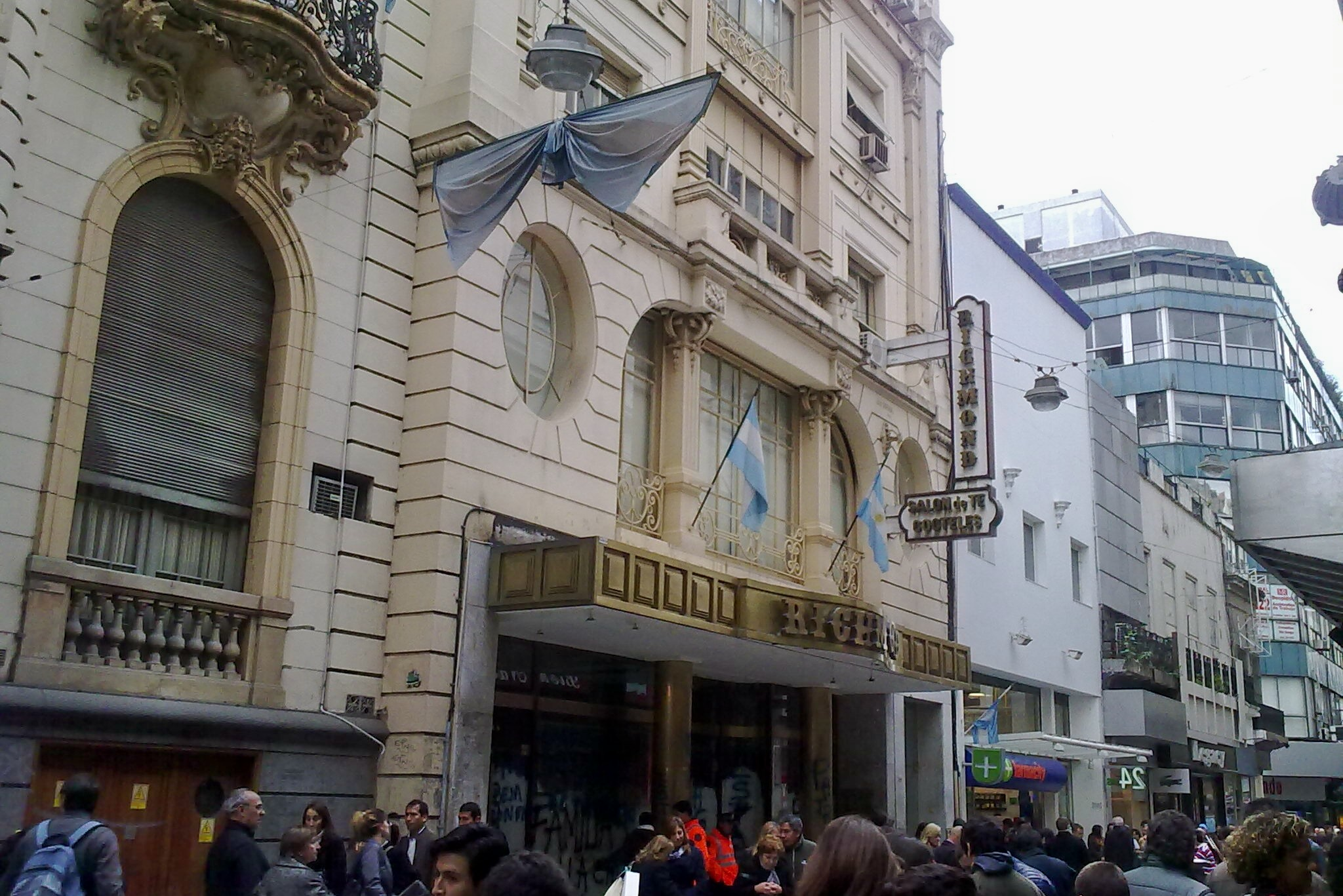
- Interactive map of Confitería Richmond

Restaurant information
- Established: 1917
- Closed: 2011
- Location: Buenos Aires, Argentina

Richmond Tea Room (Spanish: Confitería Richmond) was a tea room and literary café in Buenos Aires, Argentina.

It was notable as the meeting place of the Florida group of writers: Oliverio Girondo, Norah Lange, Ricardo Güiraldes, Norah Borges, Péle Pastorino, Francisco Luis Bernárdez, Leopoldo Marechal, Conrado Nalé Roxlo, and Raúl González Tuñón, among others.

Jorge Luis Borges and Lawrence Durrell were also other regular visitors of this café.
