= Florida Street =

Street in Buenos Aires, Argentina

Coordinates: 34.6077°S 58.375°W

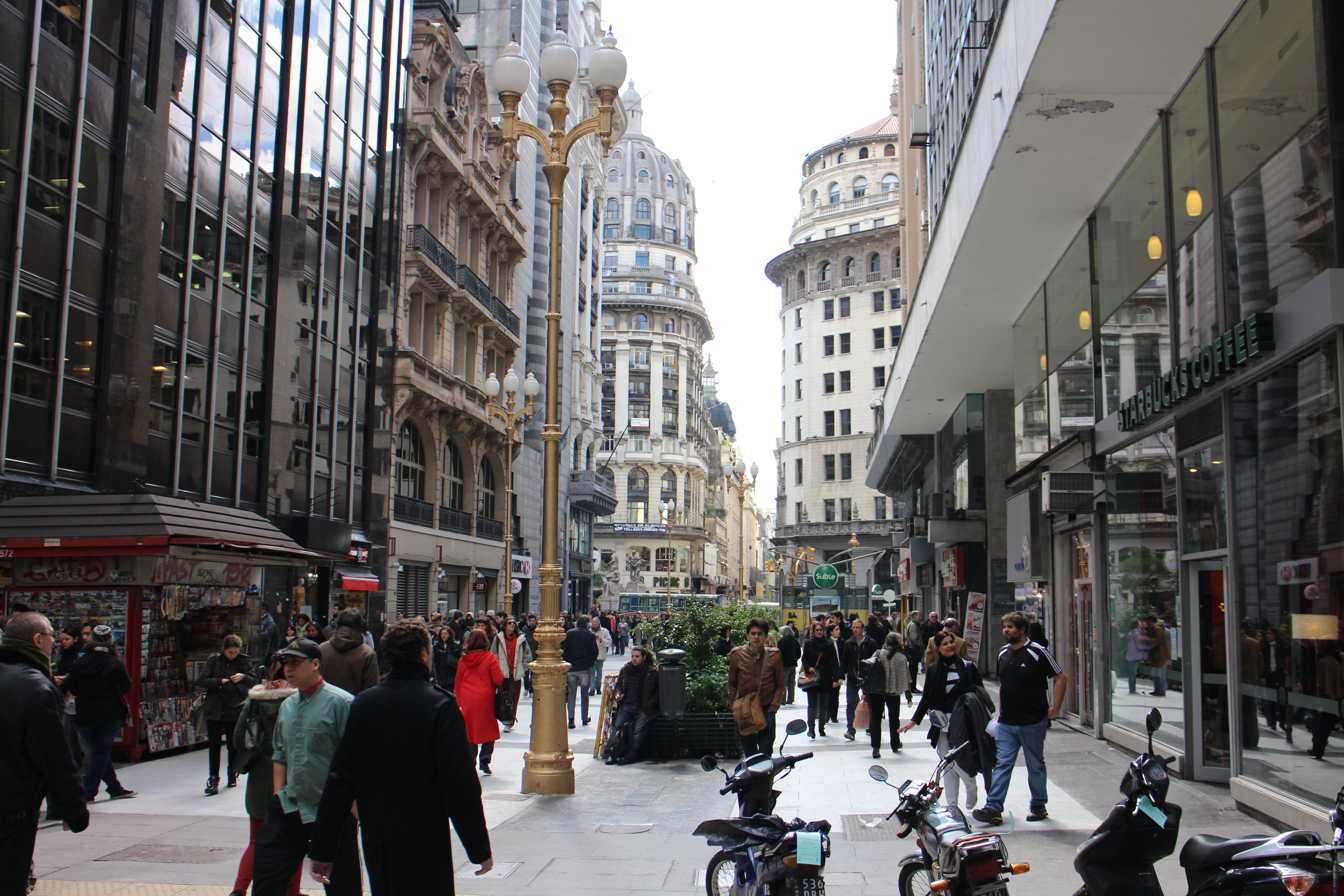
View of Florida street in 2013.

Florida Street (Spanish: Calle Florida) is a popular shopping street in Downtown Buenos Aires, Argentina. A pedestrian street since 1971, some stretches have been pedestrianized since 1913.

The pedestrian section as such starts at the intersection of Perú Street and Avenida de Mayo, a block north of the Plaza de Mayo; Perú Street crosses Rivadavia Avenue, and becomes Florida Street. Florida Street runs northwards for approximately one kilometer to Plaza San Martín, in the Retiro area. It intersects Buenos Aires's other pedestrian street, Lavalle, at the heart of the former cinema district.

Florida is one of the city's leading tourist attractions. Florida Street bustles with shoppers, vendors, and office workers alike because of its proximity to the financial district. By evening, the pace relaxes as street performers flock to the area, including tango singers and dancers, living statues, and comedy acts. Its variety of retail stores, shopping arcades, and restaurants is of great interest to foreign tourists and business travelers.

== History ==
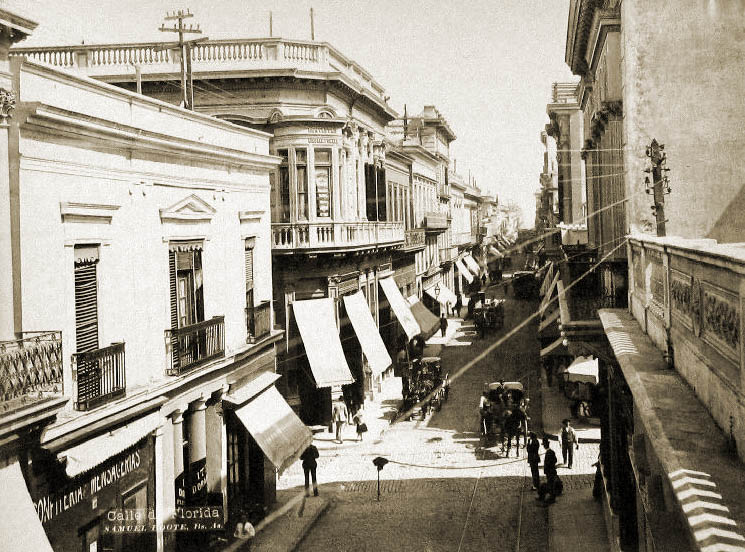
Florida street c. 1899

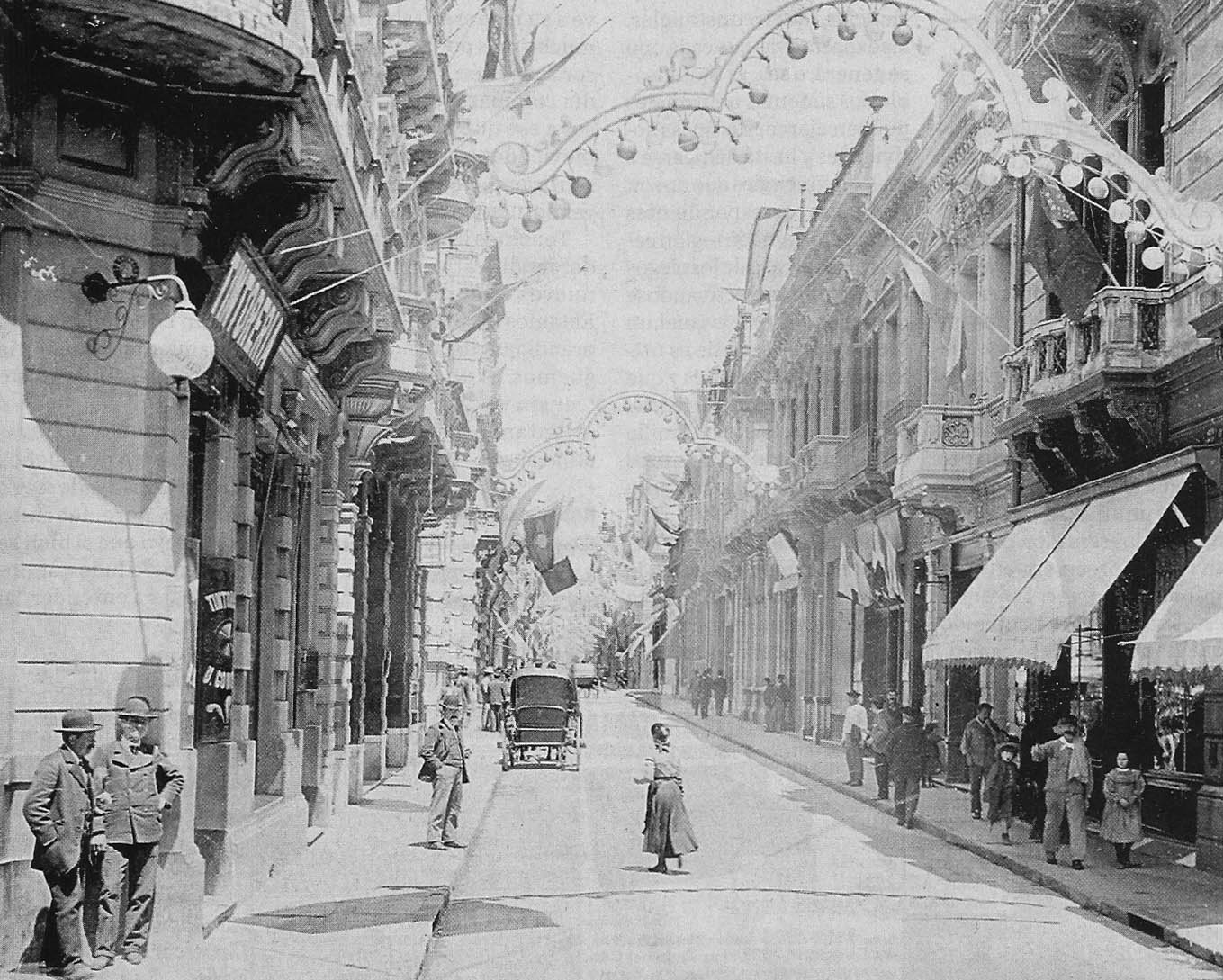
Florida with electric light, 1900.

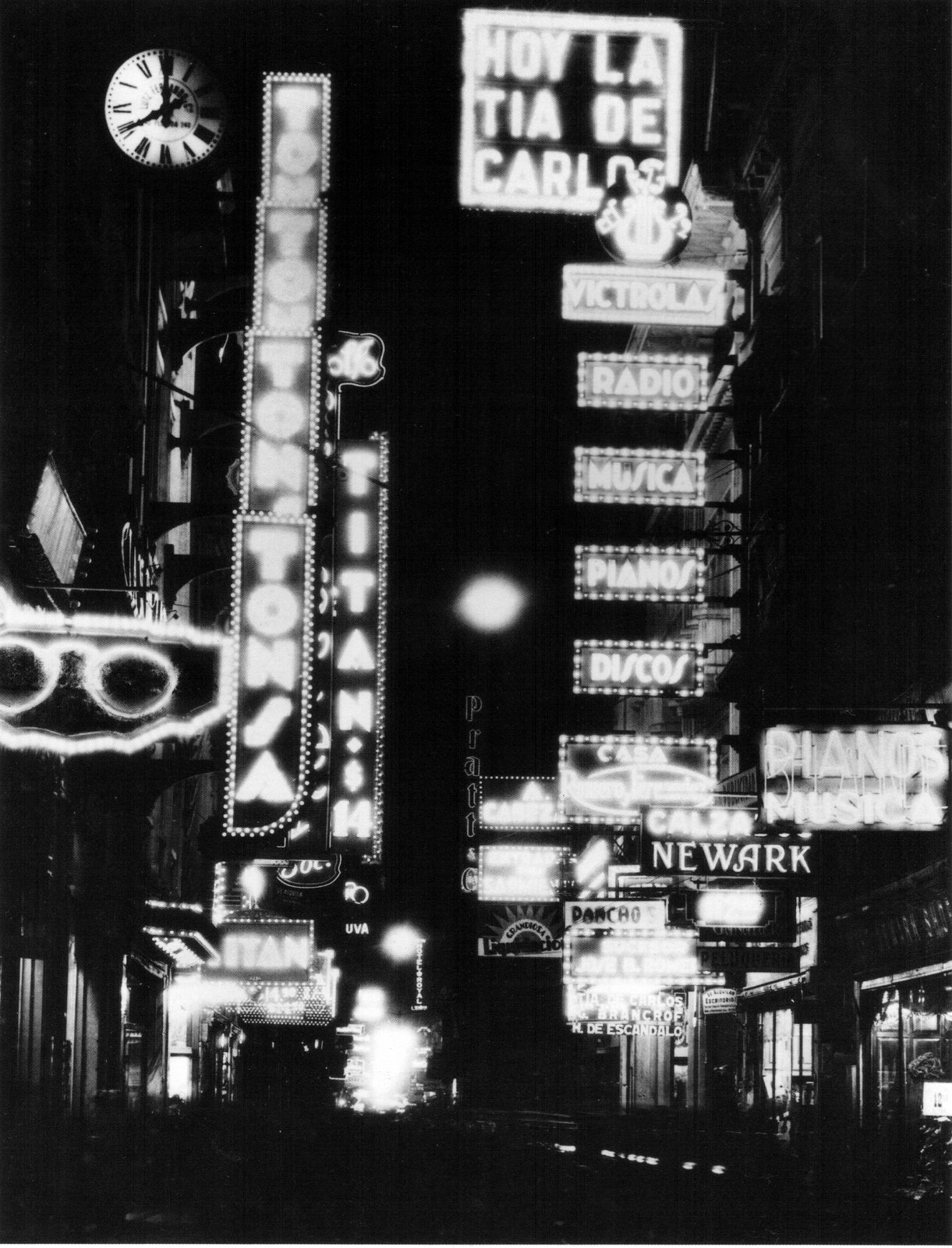
Night view in 1936.

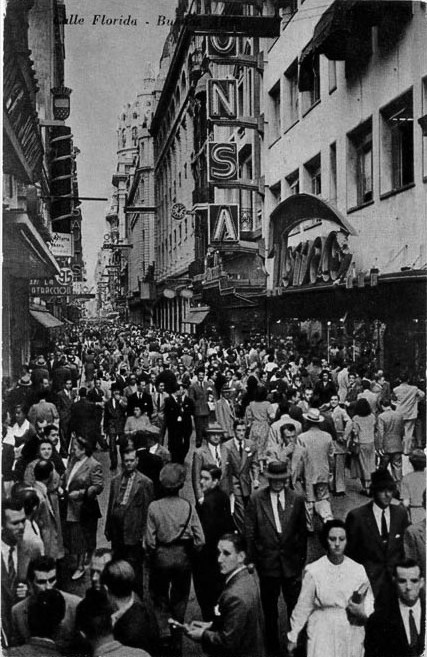
Florida in the 1950s.

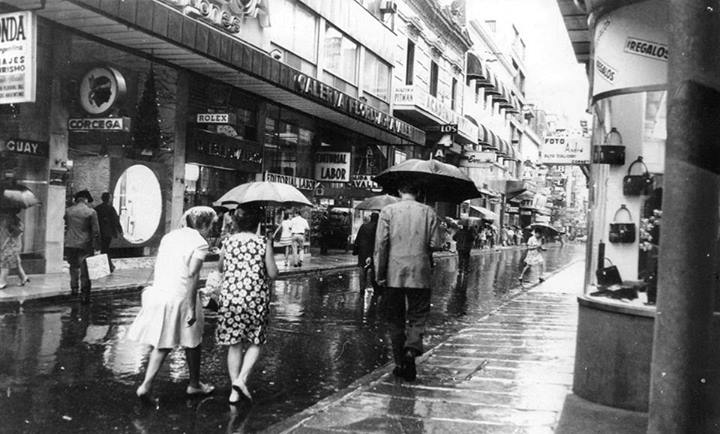
In 1969, shortly before becoming a promenade.

The beginnings of Florida Street date back to the founding of Buenos Aires in 1580, when it was hewn as a primitive path uphill from the banks of the Río de la Plata. Its first official name was "San José," enacted by Governor Miguel de Salcedo in 1734. In the late eighteenth and early nineteenth centuries, the street was known popularly as Calle del Correo (Post Street) in reference to the post office located on what later became Perú Street (the southern continuation of Florida Street). It was also later known as Empedrado (Cobbled Street). Improved with boulders brought from Montevideo beginning in 1789, it became the first paved street in the city (a section of the original cobblestone pavement is displayed behind the entrance to the Cathedral Station on Diagonal Norte Avenue). Following the British invasions of the Río de la Plata in 1808, the street was called Baltasar Unquera, in homage to an aide-de-camp to Viceroy Santiago de Liniers, fallen in the fight against Admiral William Carr Beresford. The street was first named "Florida" in 1821. The name was designated in honor of the battle fought in 1814 in Upper Peru against the royalists during the Argentine War of Independence. Governor Juan Manuel de Rosas renamed the street "Perú" in 1837, and in 1857, the name was returned to the present one.

The Argentine National Anthem was first performed in 1813 at the Florida Street home of Mariquita Sánchez de Thompson, one of the city's most prominent citizens. Argentine elites began to leave the central and southern wards of the city mainly due to epidemics, especially the 1871 yellow fever outbreak. They decided to move to higher ground in the city and chose the area known as Retiro. Florida Street, whose northern half is in the Retiro ward, became a shopping street in 1872, and would soon welcome pharmacies, furniture retailers, jewelers, and haberdasheries that offered the latest in European fashion. Numerous private mansions were also built along Florida Street in the 1880s and 1890s. The Parisian-inspired Bon Marché became the street's first large-scale shopping arcade in 1889, and the Argentine Jockey Club, the nation's most prestigious gentlemen's club and horse racing society, was inaugurated in 1897.

The Civic Youth Union, was organized in 1889 at the intersection with the Avenida Córdoba. This organization would foment the Revolution of the Park in 1890, and from its ranks the Radical Civic Union (to whom six presidents would later belong during the twentieth century) would be established in 1891.

A tram was installed along Florida Street in the 1890s, and it soon became a leading commercial artery in Buenos Aires. Vehicular traffic was barred during business hours in 1911 by request of the growing number of shop owners along Florida, and in 1913 the tram was dismantled to pedestrianize a section of the street. The 1914 inaugural of the Gath & Chaves department store coincided with the inaugural of Harrods Buenos Aires, the only overseas branch of Harrods, and the illuminated spire topped Galería Güemes. The merger of Gath & Chaves and Harrods in 1922 created two of the most ornate institutions of their kind in the Americas. Florida Street also became the address for a number of important corporate headquarters during the 1920s, including BankBoston Argentina and La Nación, the nation's leading news daily at the time. Lavalle Street, which intersects Florida, became a focal point of local cinema houses beginning in the 1930s.

The city's middle and upper classes would later relocate further north, to Recoleta, Palermo, and Belgrano, however. This trend was reinforced by the 1953 arson of the grand Jockey Club building by a Peronist mob. Its decline, however, was slowed by both an era of relative prosperity in Argentina, as well as milestones such as the inaugural of the Hotel Claridge in 1946, the Torcuato di Tella Institute's Florida Street center in 1963 (which became a hub of Buenos Aires' avant-garde and pop art scene during the 1960s), and the 1971 conversion of the street into a promenade. Writer Jorge Luis Borges lived near the northern end, and was fond of taking walks through the semi-deserted street in the pre-dawn hours. Borges was an outspoken critic of the renovation work done on the street in 1970; he was blind, and the new arrangement of trash cans, planters, flower pots, and magazine stands was a serious accessibility risk for him. He was also influenced by his esthetic-minded friends, who saw the new scheme as a break with tradition.

The economic crisis of the 1980s precluded any recovery, however. Nor did the street benefit from a consumer boom during the 1990s, as this was largely diverted toward a series of new shopping malls opened in the city's north side. Galerías Pacífico was renovated and reopened in 1991, though Harrods Buenos Aires, which by then operated only on the ground floor, would close in 1998. Mayor Fernando de la Rúa had the textured concrete pavers along Florida replaced in 1999 with granite tiles laid in a decorative black-and-white pattern.

Commerce along the street was afflicted in the ensuing years by proliferating street vendors, a result of a legal loophole in the municipal ordinance that otherwise prohibits the practice; Mayor Mauricio Macri succeeded in having these vendors removed in January 2012. Florida Street continues to command among the highest commercial rents in the city, and has become a favorite attraction among the city's growing number of foreign tourists.

== Highlights ==
=== Rivadavia Avenue to Perón Street ===
Florida Street begins at its southern end on Rivadavia Avenue. The first block, made somewhat wider than the remainder of the promenade by a city ordinance, is overlooked by the Mappin & Webb House (1911) and the post-modern former headquarters of the Banca Nazionale del Lavoro in Argentina (1989); both became branches of HSBC upon BNL's departure in 2006.

One of the most iconic locations in Buenos Aires is the intersections of Florida Street and Diagonal Norte Avenue, built between 1913 and 1943. Two of the avenue's most distinguishable buildings are located at this intersection: the Plateresque BankBoston Building (1924), the Art Deco La Equitativa del Plata (1929), and two cupola-topped Bencich Buildings (1927). The intersection forms a triangular plaza adorned with José Fioravanti's monument to President Roque Sáenz Peña (1937).

Two important shopping arcades are located on the 100 block: Galerías Boston and the landmark Galería Güemes, designed by Francisco Gianotti and opened in 1914; distinguishable by the illuminated beacon atop its spire, it was one of the tallest buildings in Buenos Aires at the time. The former Gath & Chaves department store (1914) and annex (overlooking Avenida de Mayo) were located here until the retailer's closure in 1974; the buildings today house Banco Meridian, the local branch of Deloitte, as well as Chilean retailer Falabella.

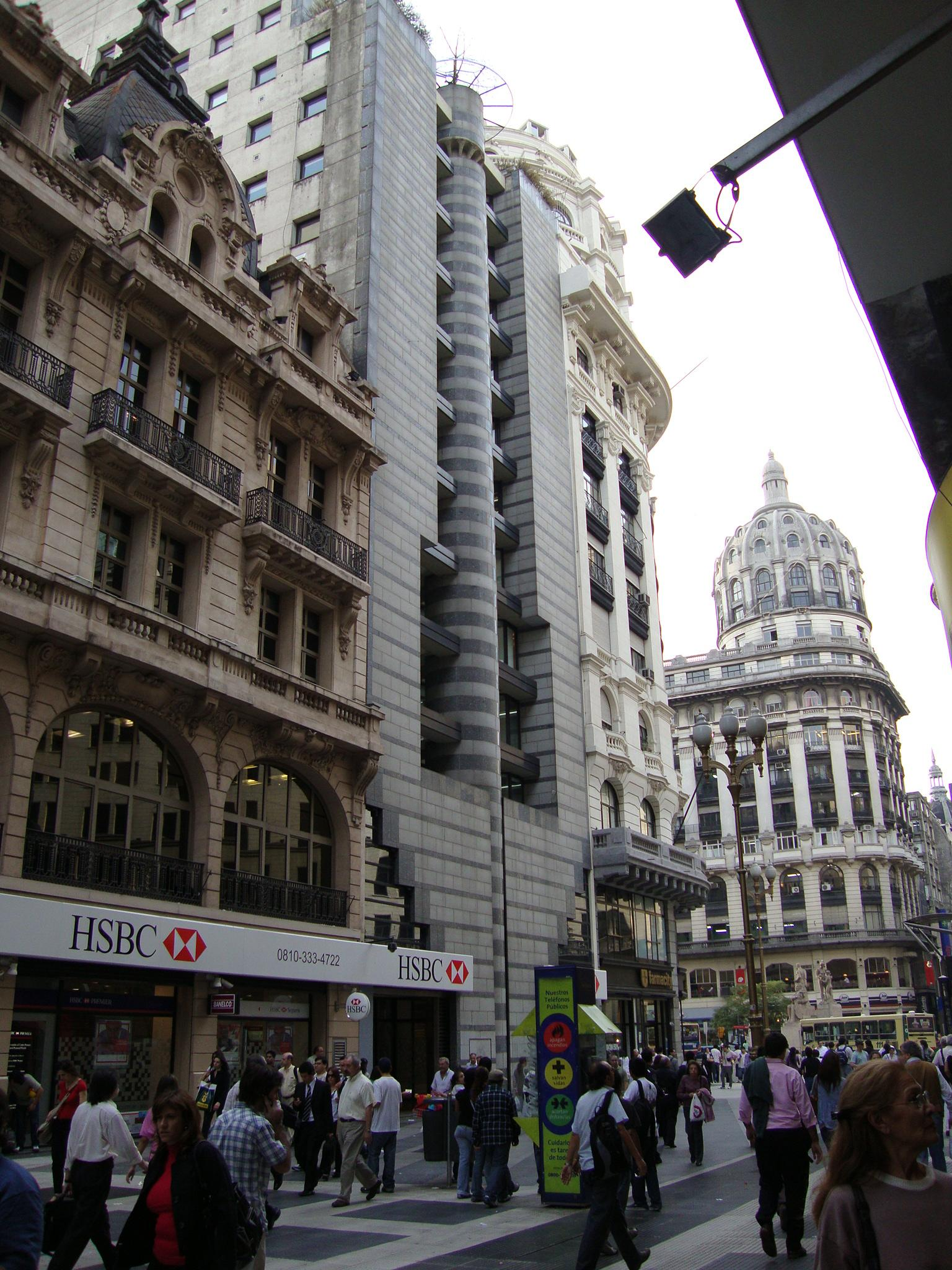
From left: Mappin & Webb, the former BNL, and the Bencich bldg.

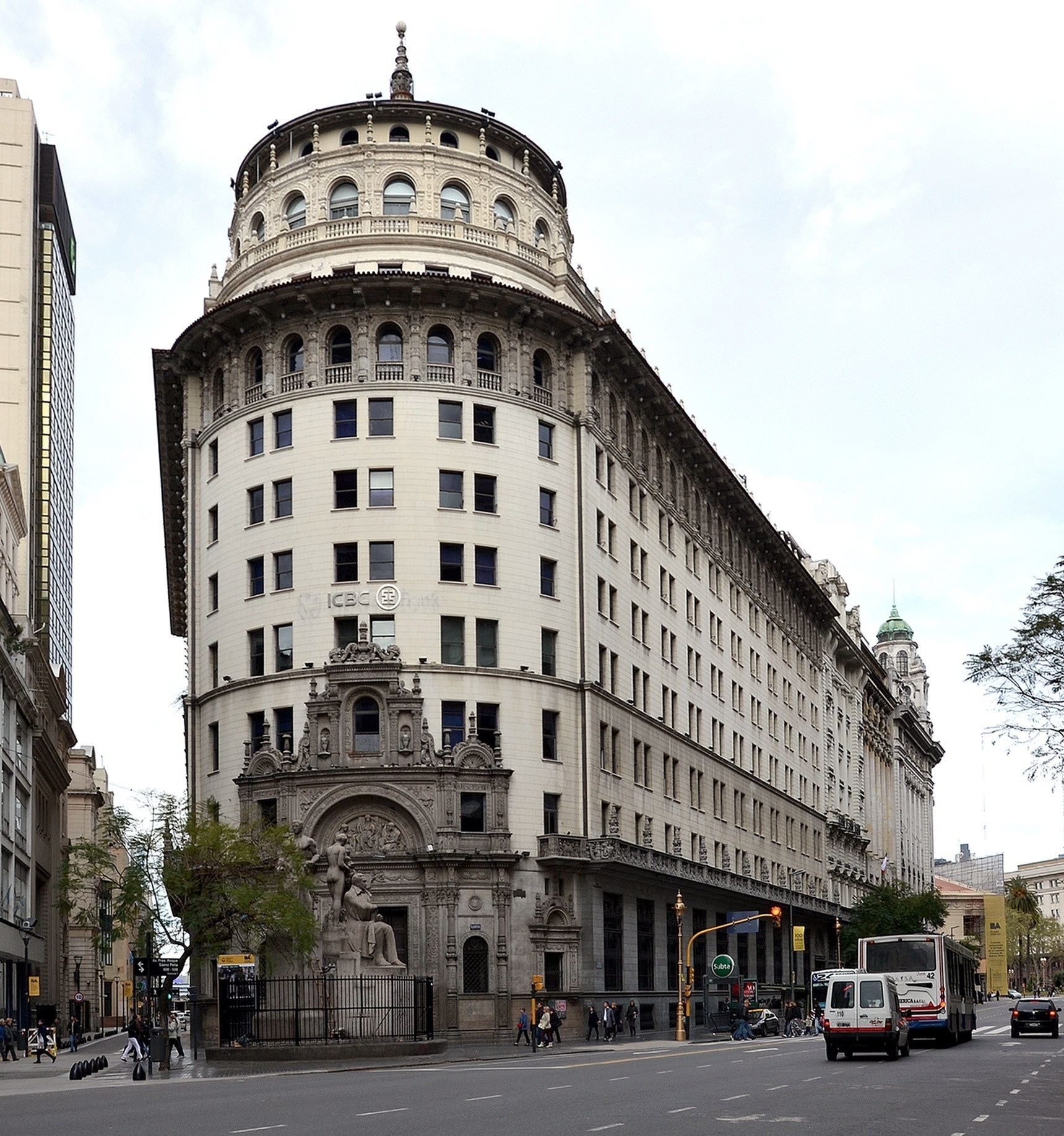
BankBoston (1924),
today ICBC Argentina

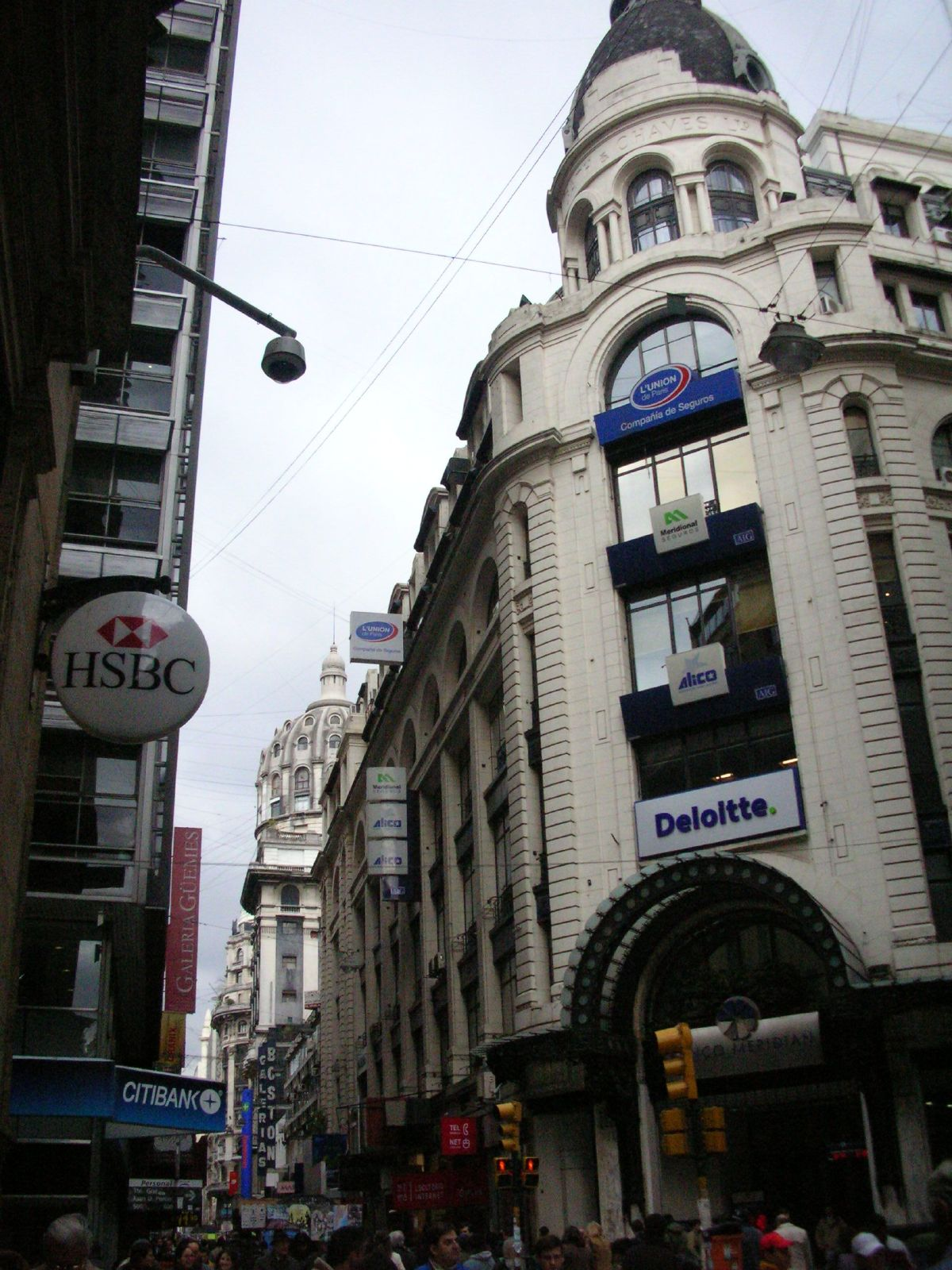
Former Gath & Chaves store

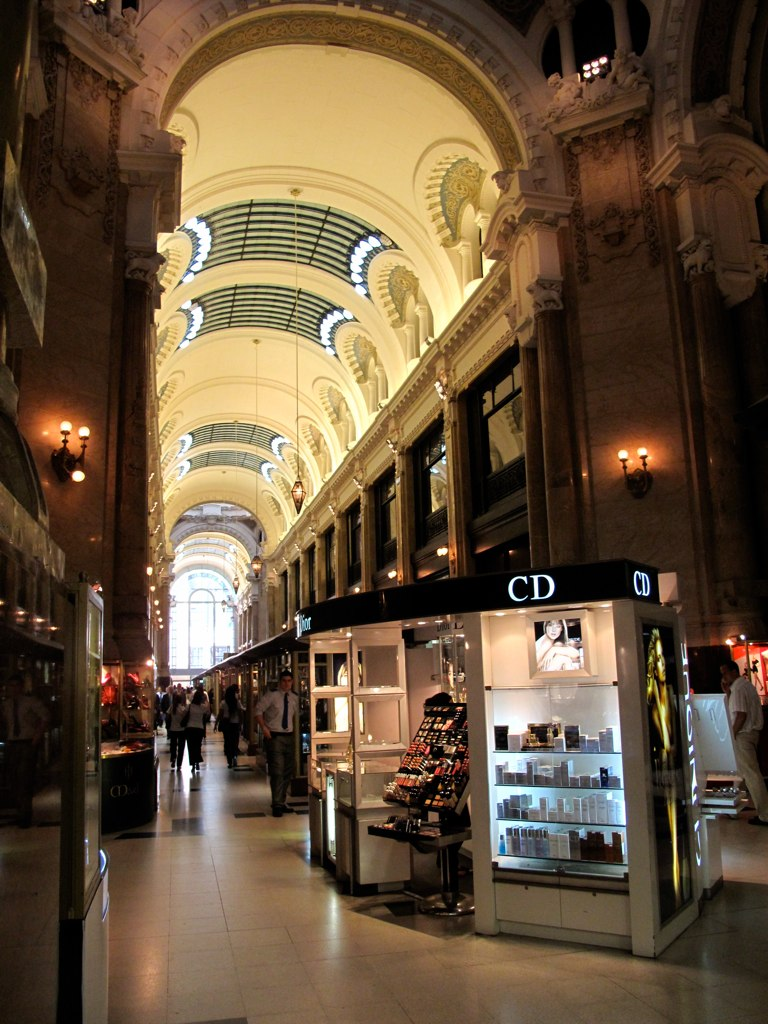
Galería Güemes arcade

=== Perón Street to Lavalle Street ===
The 200 block features the former Grand Florida Cinema (1925), created in an eclectic Art Deco design by Jorge Kálnay. The corner of Perón Street is overlooked by the Plateresque former Banco Popular Argentino (1931), today the headquarters of HSBC Bank Argentina. The corner of Sarmiento Street is the site of the Bank of the City of Buenos Aires headquarters since 1968, located in a building originally opened in 1908 as the Mexico City Store.

The 300 block includes the oldest existing bookstore of El Ateneo chain (one of two on Florida Street); founded in 1912, the booksellers opened their first Florida Street store in 1936. Facing El Ateneo is the former headquarters of La Nación newspaper. One of numerous Plateresque office buildings completed in the area during the 1920s, the building, known today as the Mitre Gallery, is the second store opened on Florida Street by Falabella. The corner of the intersection with Avenida Corrientes is overlooked by office high-rises, a Stock Center sporting goods megastore, and, for contrast, the former Elortondo Alvear residence (1880); the neo-Gothic mansion was converted into a Burger King in the 1990s.

The Julio Peña residence (1917), today the headquarters of the Sociedad Rural Argentina, is one of the few private residences surviving from the time luxurious homes shared Florida Street with commercial establishments. Opened the same year, the Richmond Café next door was a favorite coffee house among local upscale patrons; Jorge Luis Borges, Graham Greene, and the Florida group of avant-garde writers were among the many literati who gathered there. The Richmond closed amid controversy in 2011. The 400 block ends at the intersection with Lavalle Street, and is overlooked by both curtain walled office mid-rises and French architecture. Lavalle Street, from the 1930s until the 1990s, rivaled Corrientes Avenue for the number of movie theaters along its downtown stretch; most have since closed, however, and Lavalle, which was pedestrianized in 1978, became largely a shopping street. The large numbers of pedestrians at the intersection between the two also made the intersection a forum for performances by street artists.

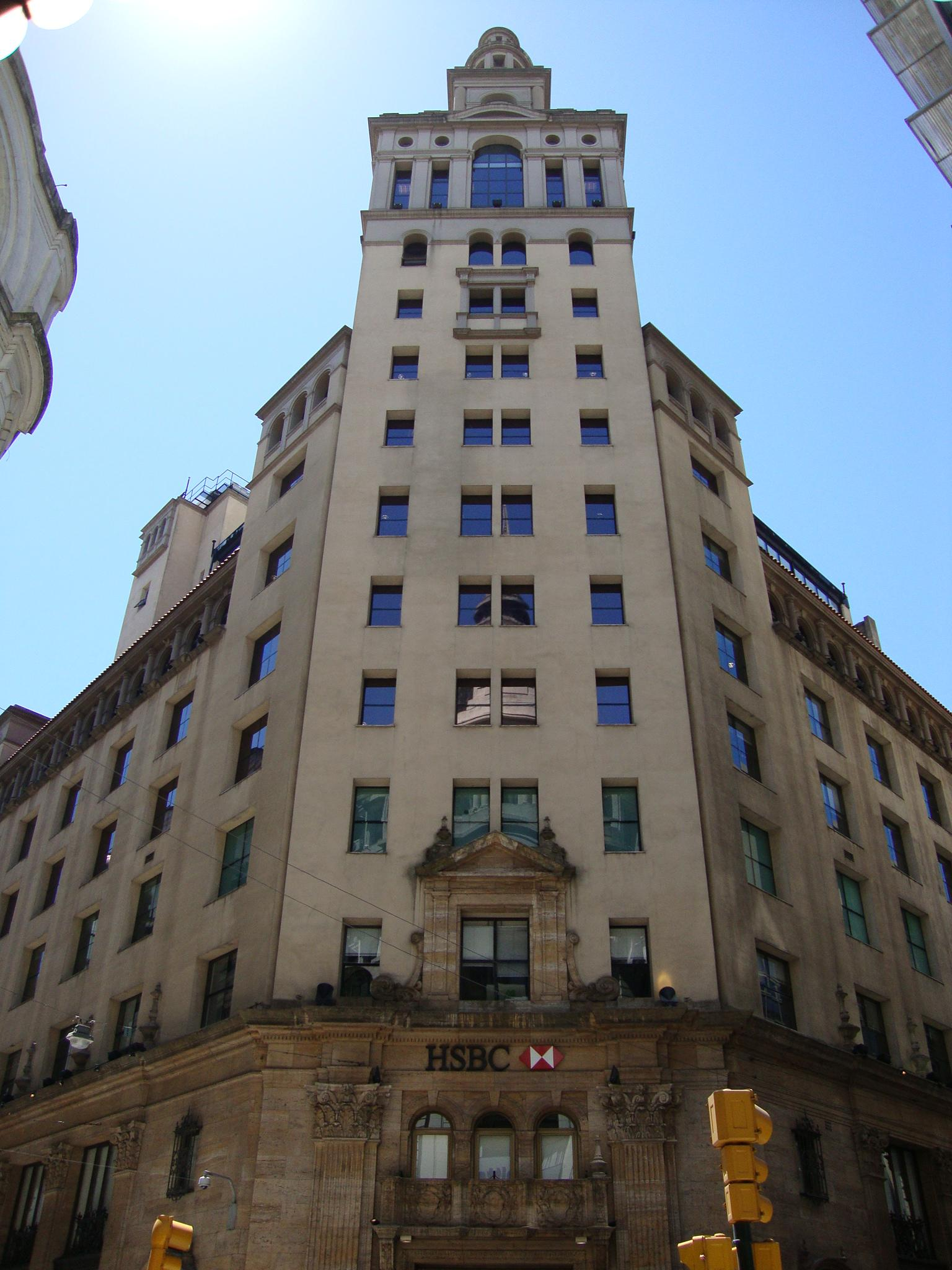
Banco Popular (today HSBC)

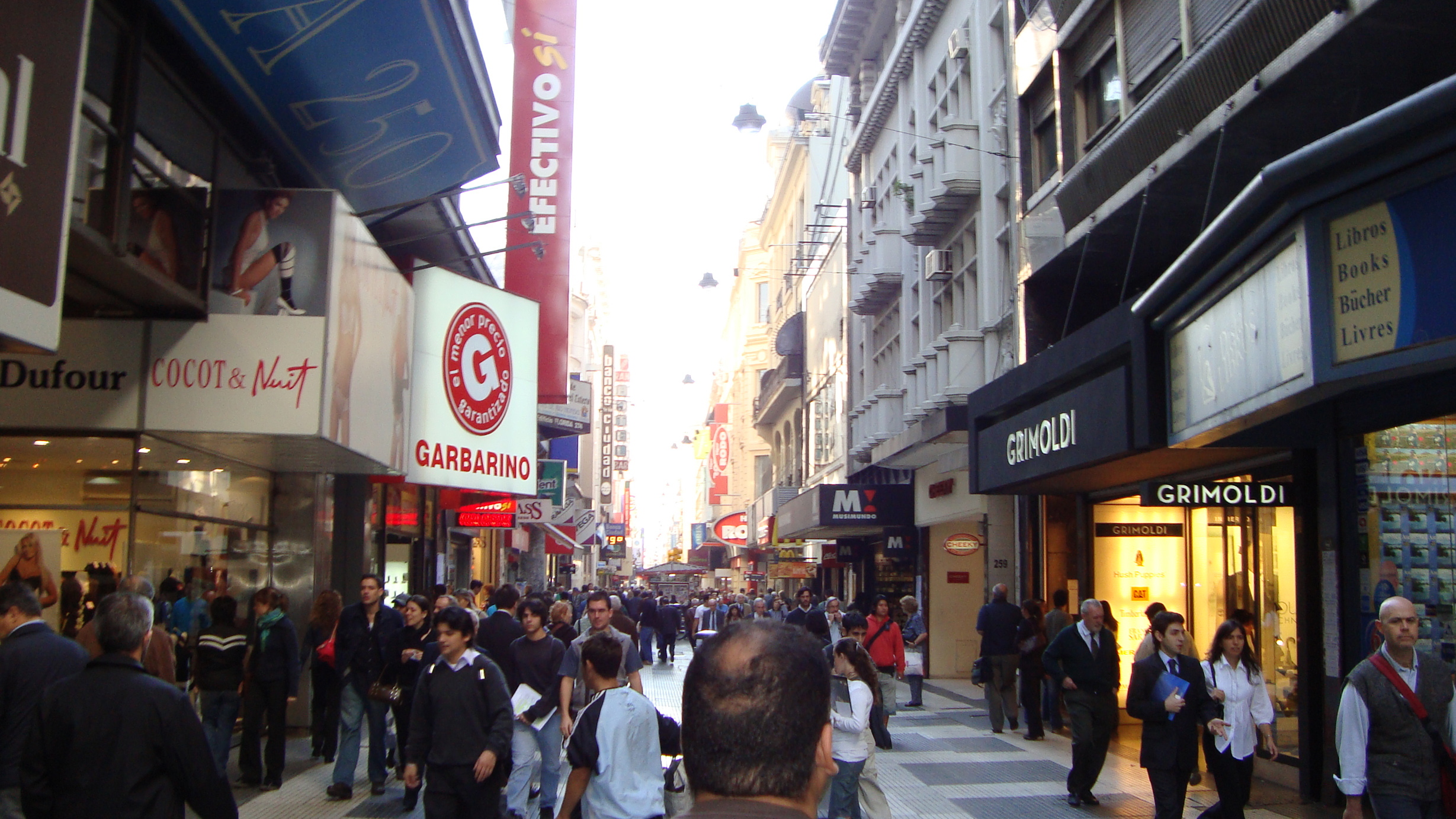
200 block

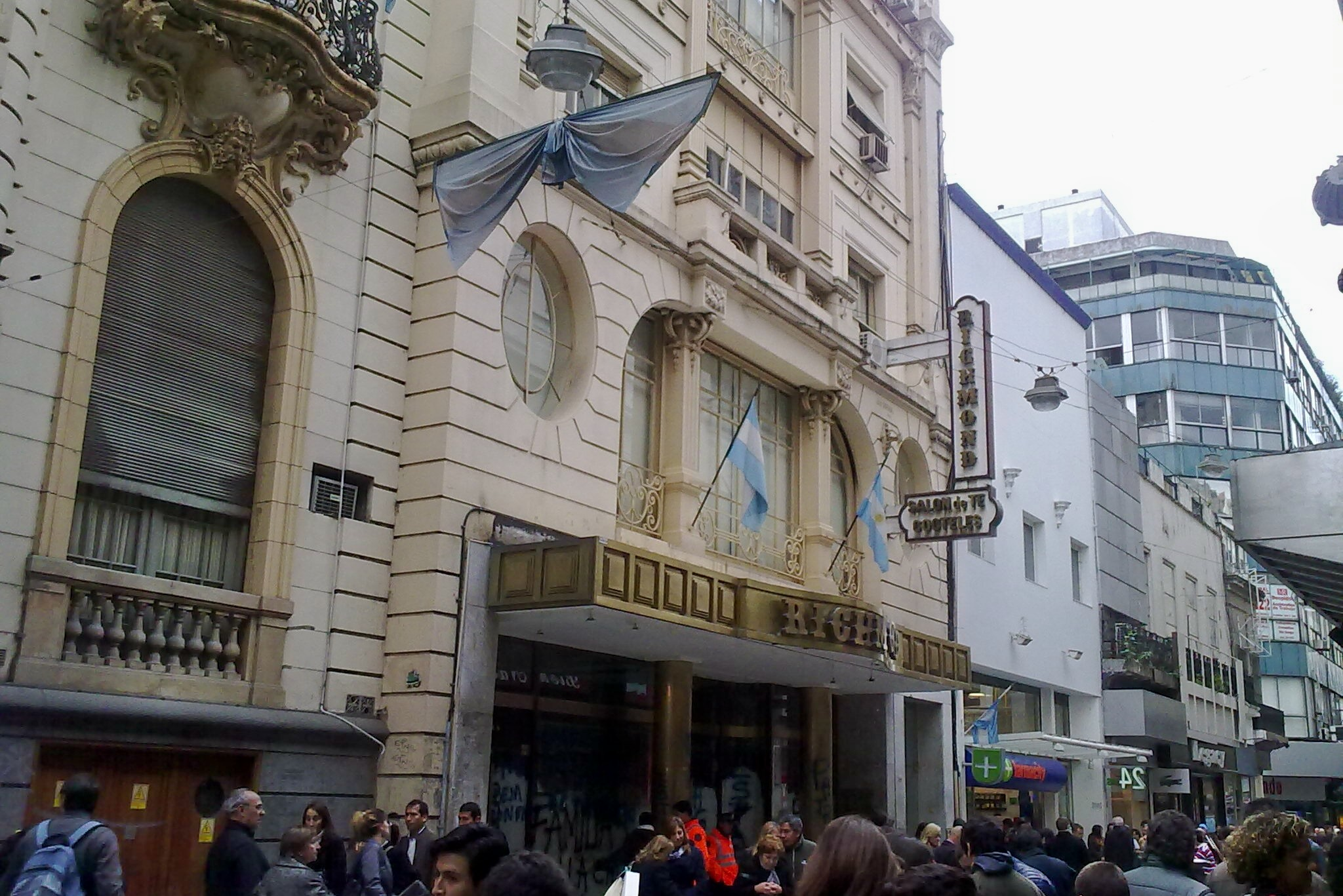
Former Richmond Café

=== Lavalle Street to Córdoba Avenue ===
The 500 block was the site of the Jockey Club, designed by Manuel Turner and completed in 1897. Founded in 1882 by future President Carlos Pellegrini, the institution governed horse racing in Argentina, and built the Palermo and San Isidro racecourses. An incident on April 15, 1953, in which bombs were detonated at the Plaza de Mayo during one of President Juan Perón's many rallies, resulted in the destruction of the Beaux-Arts landmark by enraged Peronists, who viewed the aristocratic Jockey Club as a center of anti-Peronism. The lot lay empty until the construction of Galería Jardín (1976), an office and retail complex designed by Mario Roberto Álvarez in a belated International Style. The complex includes several levels of shops, a basement for offices and two high-rise towers, one of which is residential. Its retail section is known for its selection of consumer electronics and computer equipment.

An Art Deco office building on the northwest corner of Tucumán Street and the neo-classical Cadellada Building highlight the 600 block; a second El Ateneo bookshop, a third Falabella store, and the modern Galería Arax (site of the Buenos Aires Auditorium) are also located there.

The renowned Galerías Pacífico shopping arcade occupies nearly the entire block along the eastern side of the 700 block. The monumental building, designed by Roland le Vacher in 1888 to house the Au Bon Marché shops, also housed the National Museum of Fine Arts from 1896 to 1910, and thereafter the head office of the Buenos Aires and Pacific Railway; restored in 1991, its grand interiors also feature ceiling frescoes by Antonio Berni, Juan Carlos Castagnino, and other famed Argentine painters.

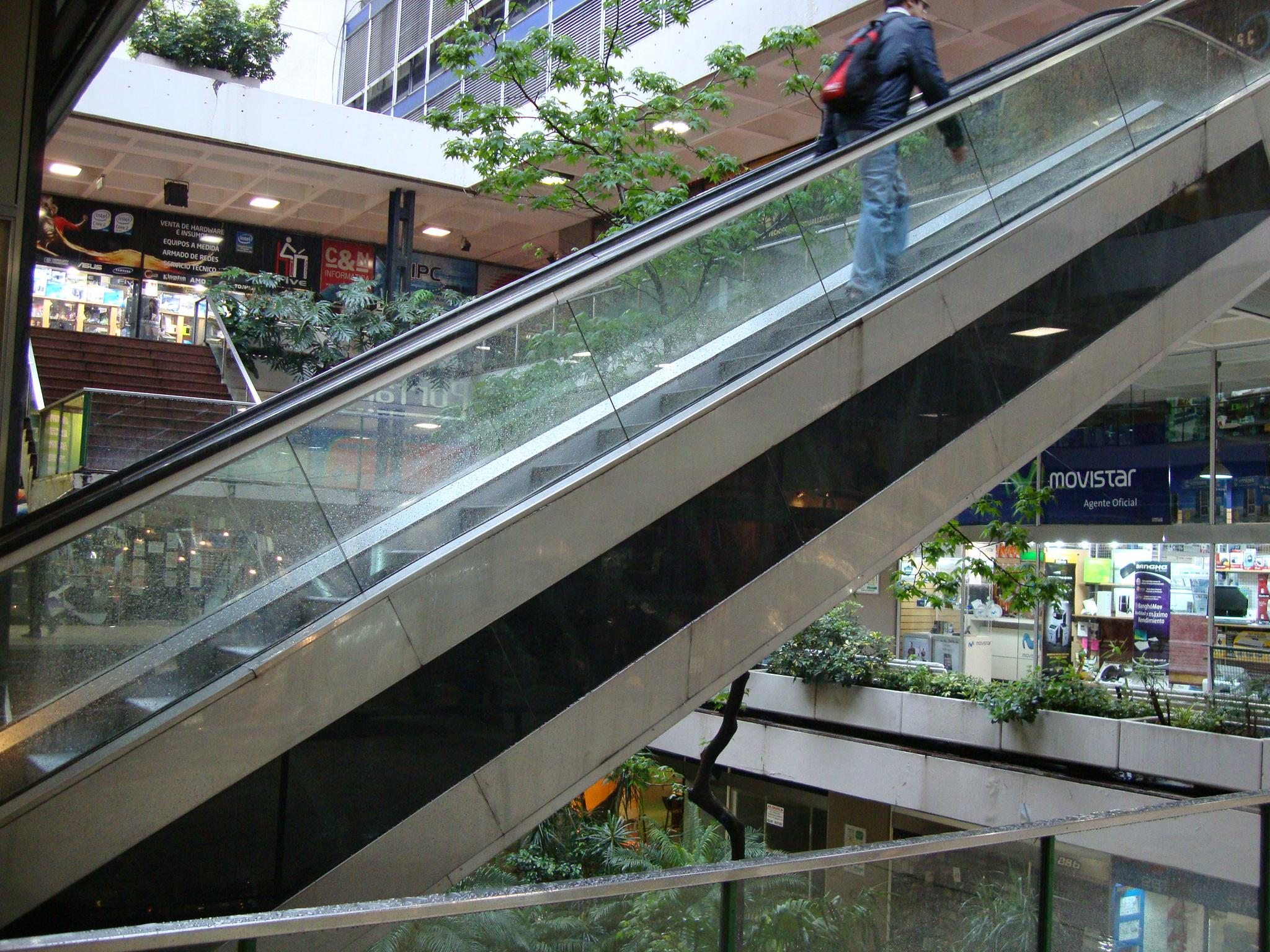
Atrium in Galería Jardín

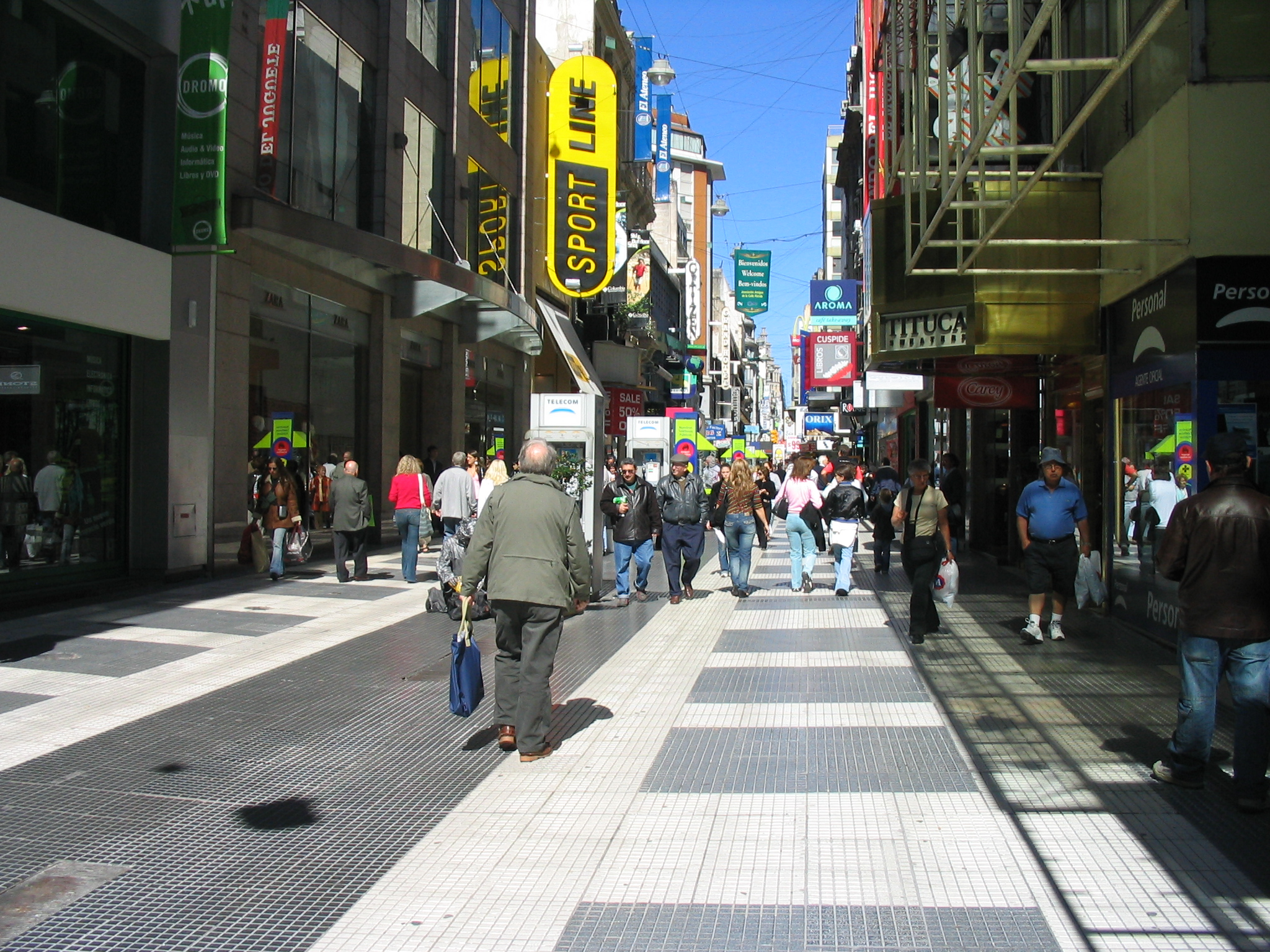
600 block

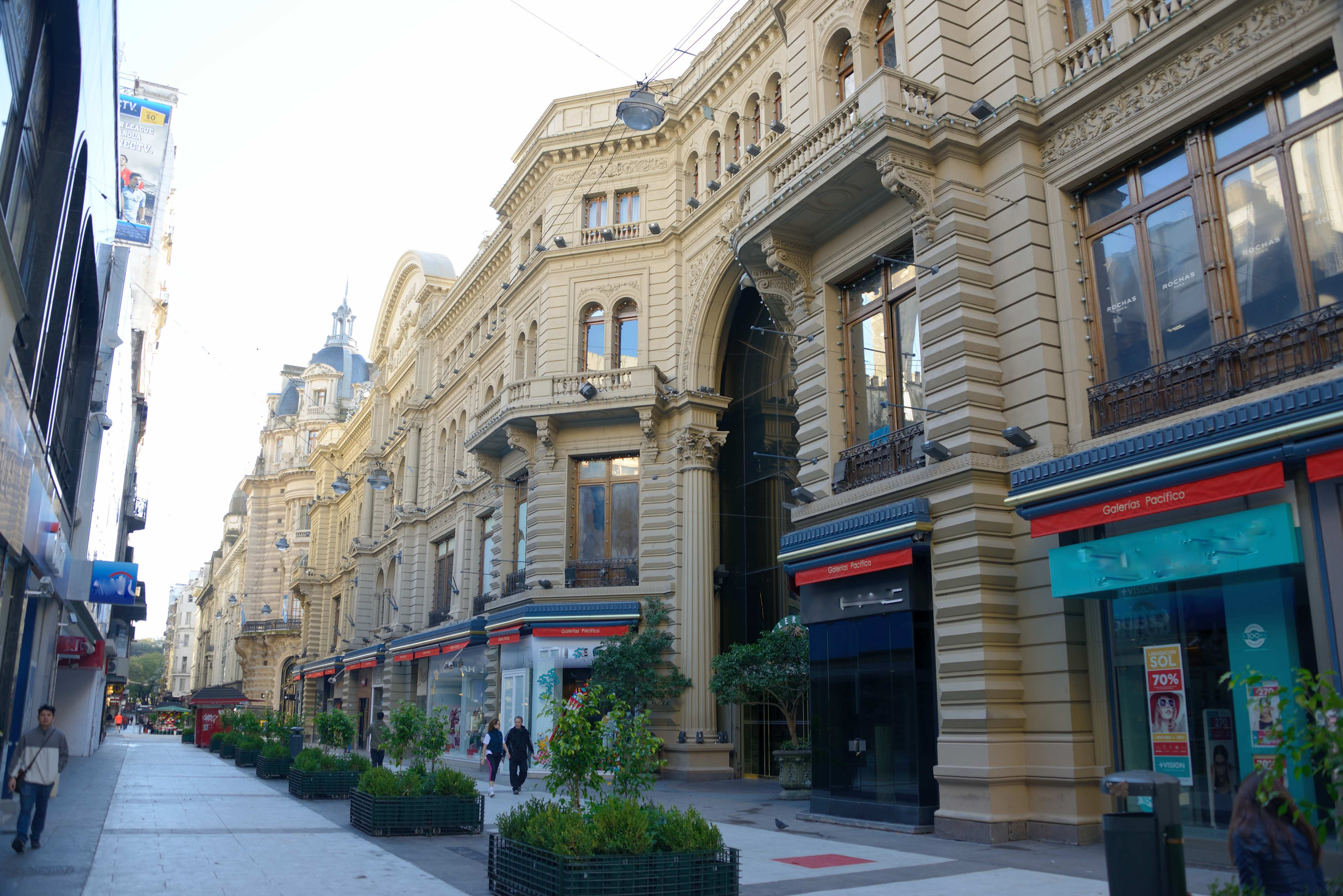
Galerías Pacífico

=== Córdoba Avenue to Plaza San Martín ===
The junction with Córdoba Avenue marks the street's entry into the Retiro ward. The northeast corner is distinguished by the magnificent Naval Center (1914), designed by Jacques Dunant and Gastón Mallet in a Beaux-Arts style. Separated from the Naval Center by Galería Buenos Aires is the former Harrods Buenos Aires, completed in 1920. Following a lengthy legal struggle with the then-owner of the Harrods on Knightsbridge, Mohamed Al-Fayed, the department store closed in 1998, and since functions intermittently as a venue for cultural events, notably the Buenos Aires Tango Festival. The current owners, Swiss equity firm CBC Interconfianz, filed permits to restore Harrods Buenos Aires in 2009. The modern Galería del Sol faces the former Harrods. Galería Florida (1964), a curtain-walled high rise designed by Álvarez for Air France, stands on the southwest corner with Paraguay Street, and the Florida Garden Café, opened in 1962 in a belle époque building, is on the southeast.

The Cultural Center of Spain in Buenos Aires (CCEB) is located on the 900 block. This block, however, is best known locally as the erstwhile site of the Torcuato di Tella Institute. Located on Florida Street during its heyday between 1963 and 1970, the institute was led at the time by former National Fine Arts Museum director Jorge Romero Brest, who steered the center as the leading Argentine venue for pop art, experimental theatre, and conceptual art, drawing artists such as León Ferrari, Gyula Kosice, Luis Felipe Noé, and Antonio Seguí. Romero Brest also promoted the center's famed Happenings, notably those of Marta Minujín, whose interactive displays and mazes helped make this block of Florida Street Buenos Aires' mazana loca (city block of madness).

The street continues into the Juvenilia Esplanade, centered around a memorial to writer Esteban Echeverría, and overlooked by a French-inspired apartment building designed by Alejandro Bustillo. The Ruth Benzacar Gallery, another leading promoter of local avant-garde art, opened in 1965 and is also located here. Facing the esplanade is Plaza San Martín, designed by the noted urbanist Charles Thays in 1889. Upscale Santa Fe Avenue merges into Florida Street along the Plaza Hotel, designed by Adolf Zucker for local banker Ernesto Tornquist and inaugurated in 1909.

Florida Street becomes San Martín Street one block south of Avenida del Libertador, and beside the best known of Buenos Aires' Art Deco landmarks, the Kavanagh Building. Overlooking Plaza San Martín, the 120 m (390 ft) apartment building was designed in 1934 by the firm of Sánchez, Lagos and de la Tour for Corina Kavanagh. Local lore has it that the wealthy Irish Argentine heiress planned the high-rise as a revenge against the Anchorena family, and made but one demand of the architects: that views of the Anchorenas' Church of the Holy Sacrament from their residence, the San Martín Palace, be blocked.

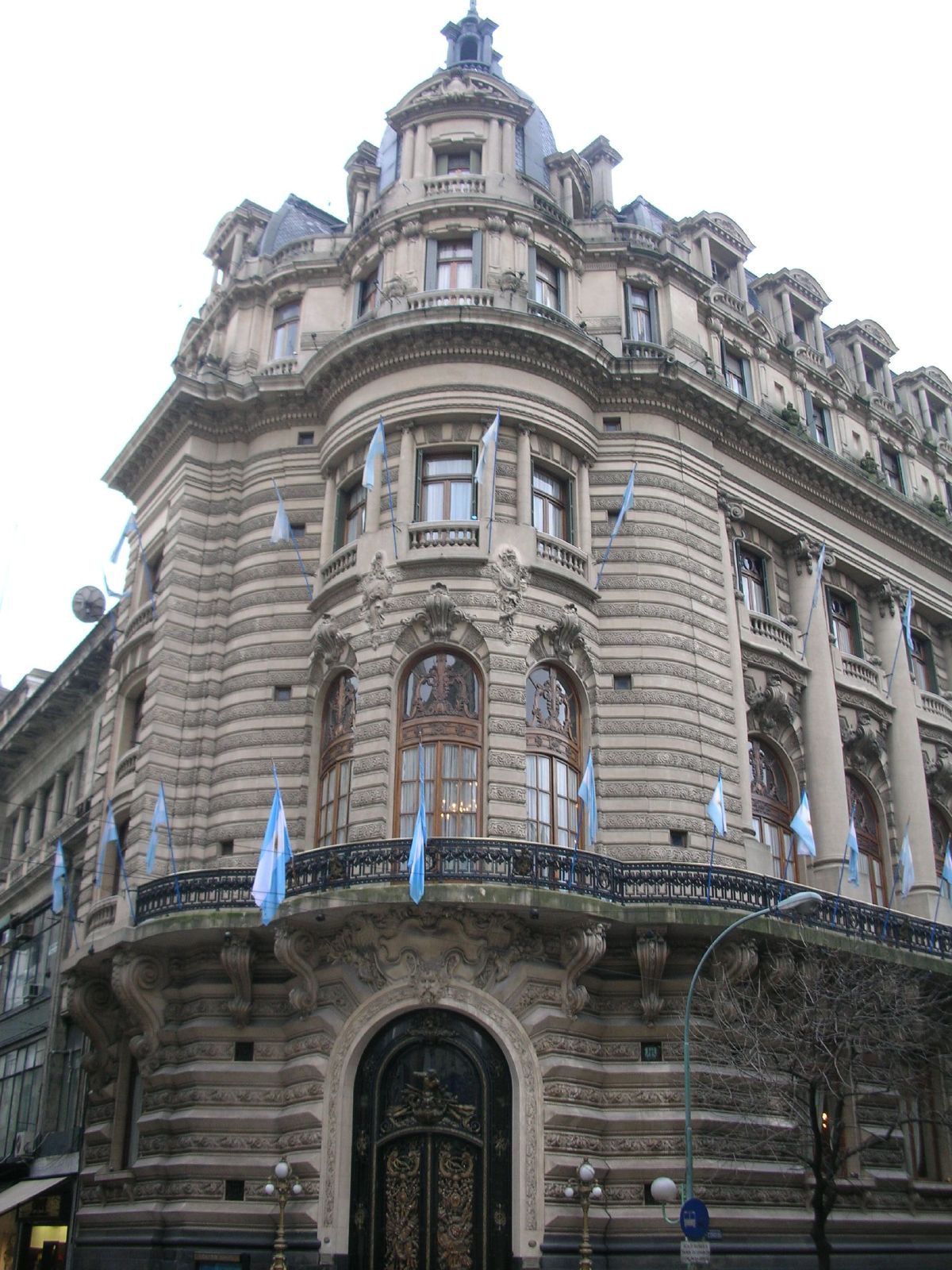
Naval Center

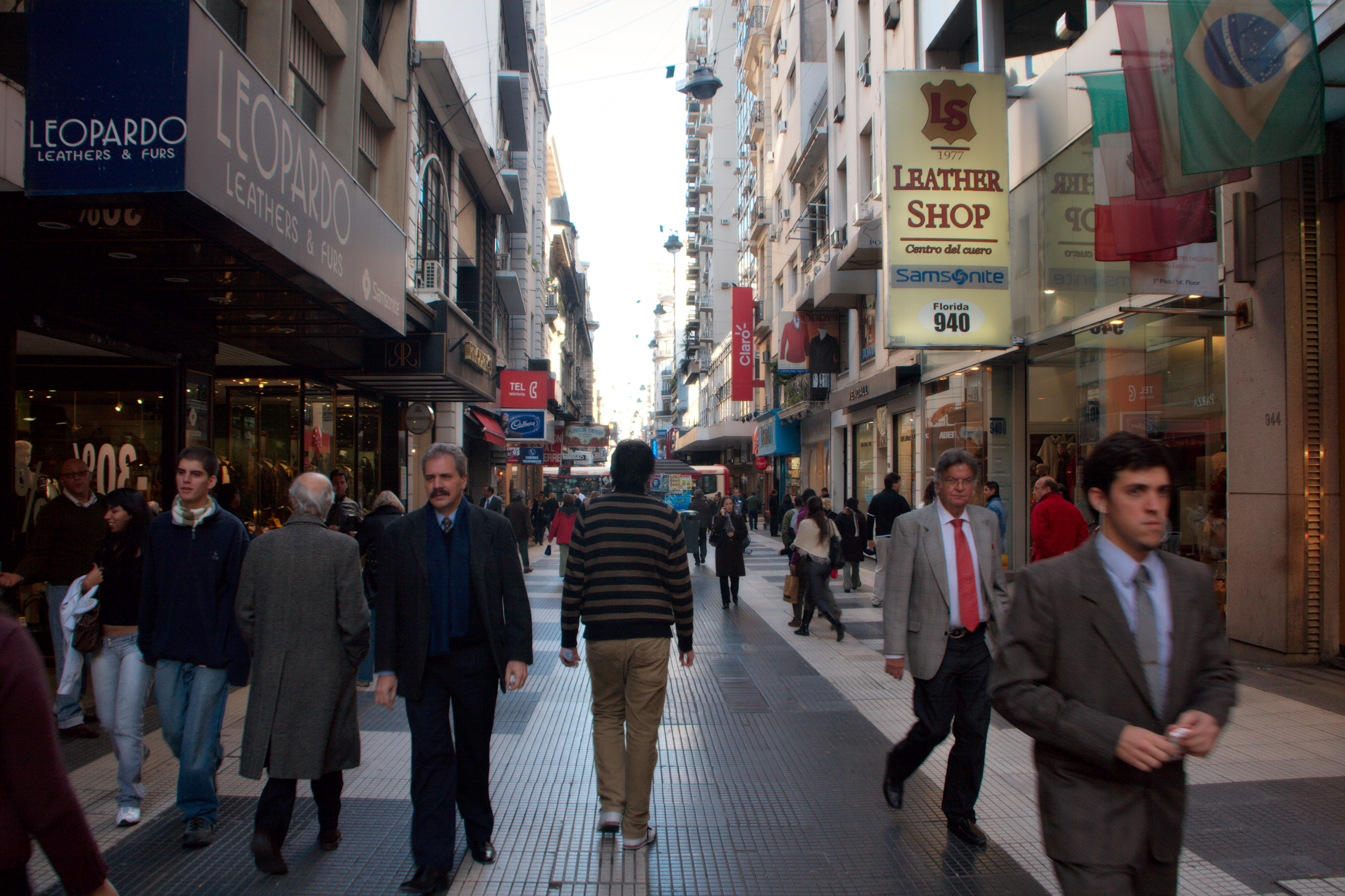
900 block

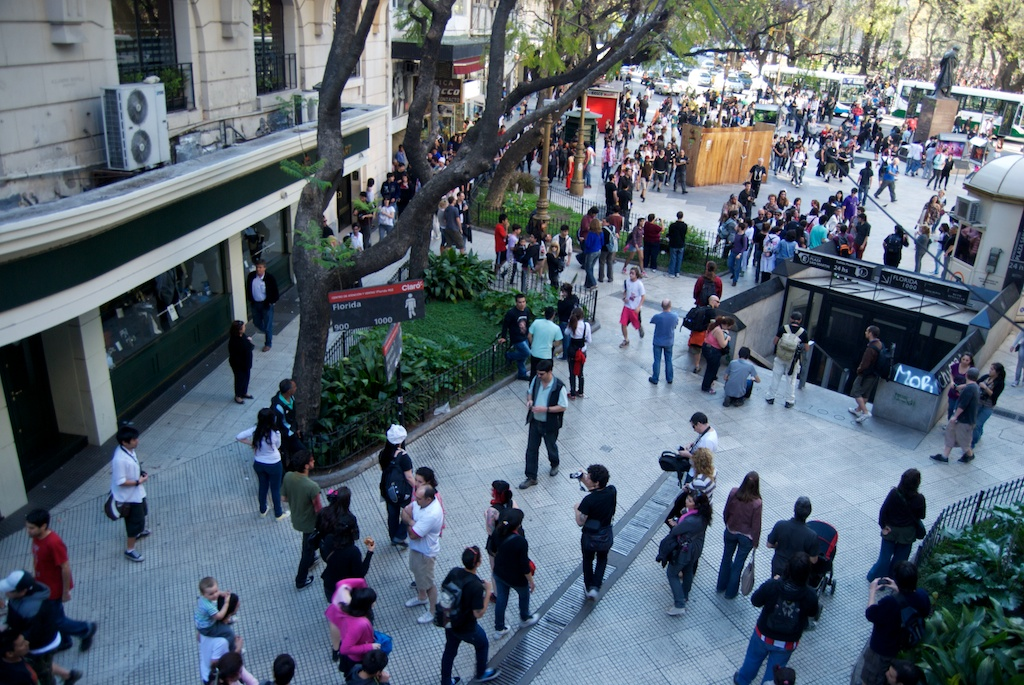
Juvenilia Esplanade

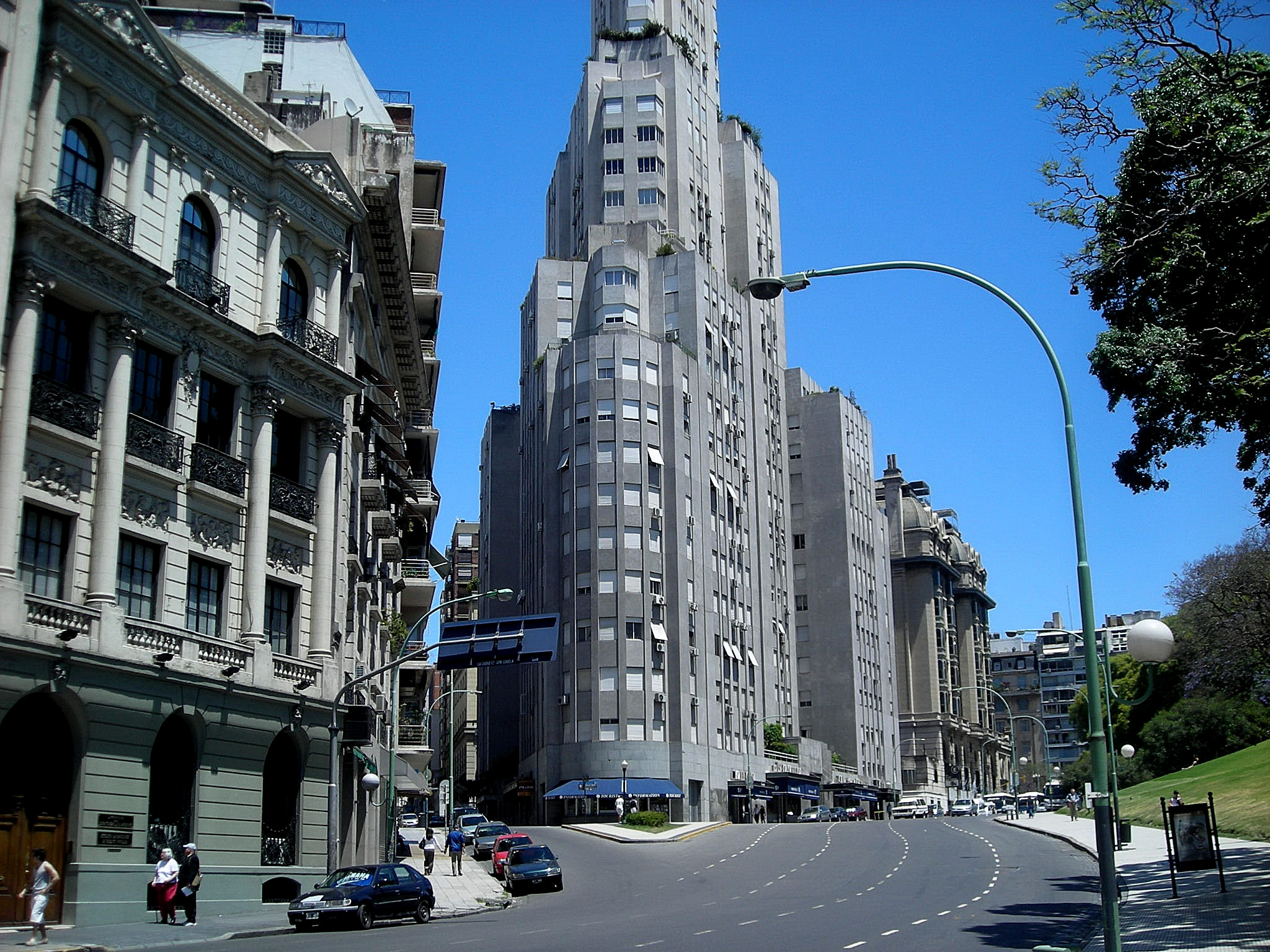
Kavanagh Building and Plaza Hotel (right)

== Transportation ==
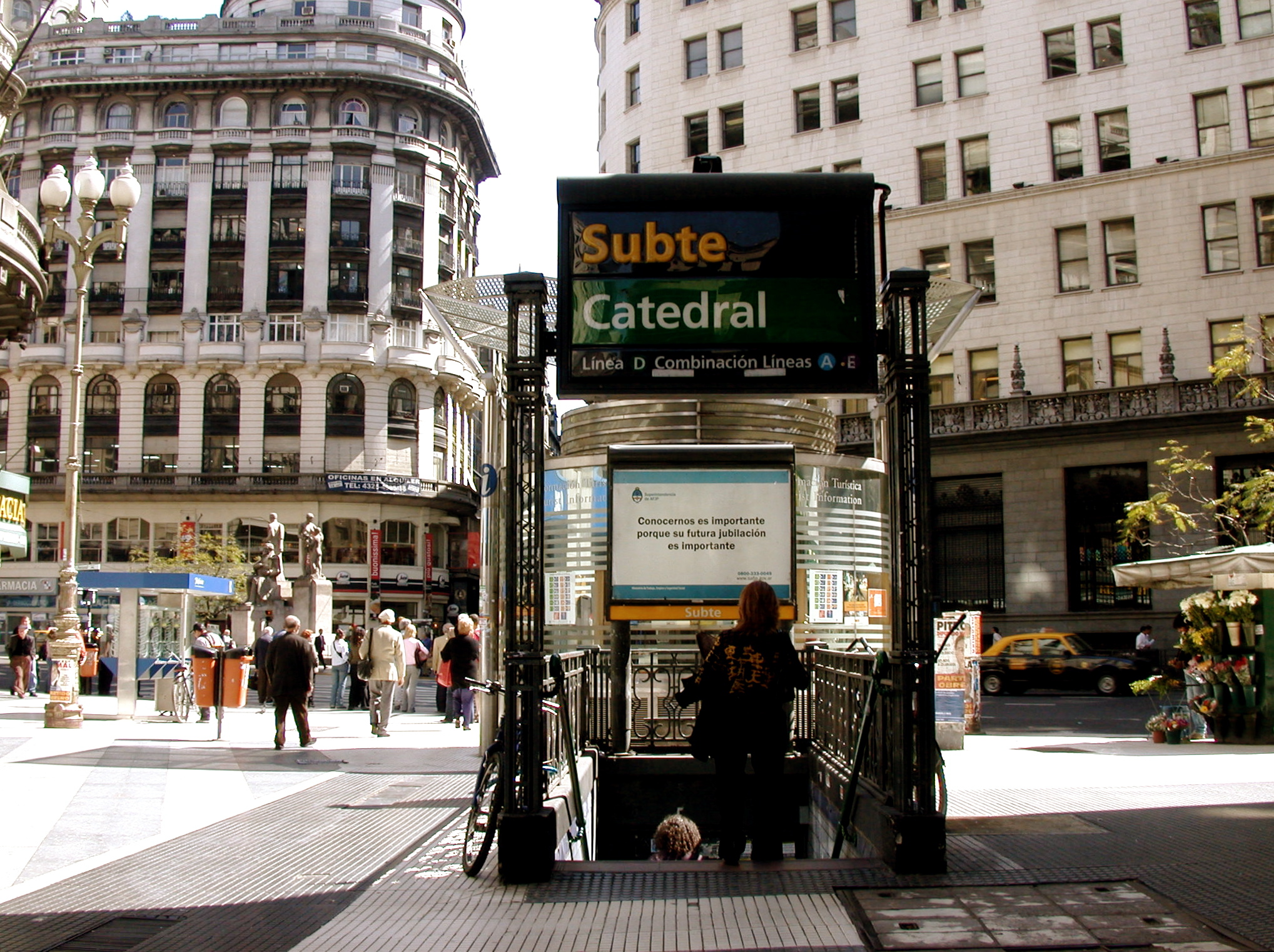
Entrance to Line D, Catedral Station.

The preferable means of transportation to reach Florida Street from almost anywhere in the city, is the Buenos Aires Metro (subte, or underground). Five metro lines have stations within a short walking distance of Florida. Most bus lines reaching the downtown area have stops near Florida Street, as well.

Florida Station

Catedral Station

The Retiro transportation hub, which maintains a terminal for long-distance buses and a railway station for three major lines, is located near the northern end of Florida, across Avenida del Libertador. Line C of the metro provides access to both Retiro and Constitución Stations.

== See also ==
- Florida group
- Tourism in Buenos Aires
- Obelisk of Buenos Aires
- Teatro Colón
- Tourism in Argentina
- List of upscale shopping districts
