= Pelegrina Pastorino =

Argentinian journalist (1902–1988)

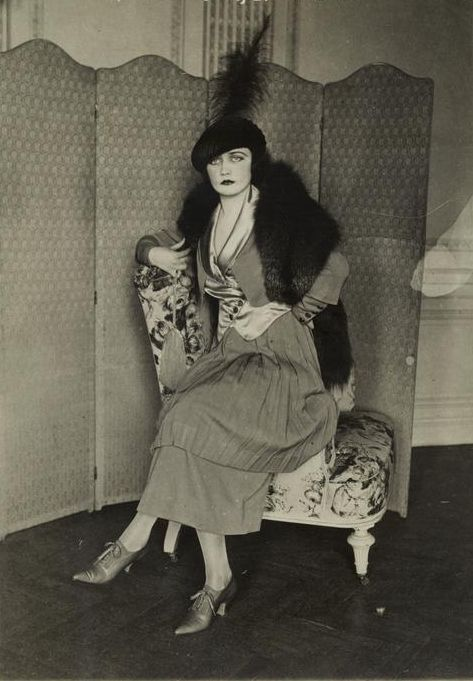
"Péle", Pelegrina Pastorino, Ladies Fashion Catalogue, Spring Season Harrods Buenos Aires editorial, March 1925

Péle, a nickname for Pelegrina Pastorino, (1902 – 1988) was a reputable Argentine women's fashion reporter, fashion editor, critics translator, feminist educator, and a member of the Florida group; she actively participated in the movement of women's rights during the 1930s and 1940s period.

== Career ==
Pele was born at Palazzo Pastorino in Genoa, Italy. The building, located in the Portoria district of central Genoa, was designed in the Art Nouveau style by architect Gino Coppedè. She later emigrated to Argentina with her family at an early age.

As a young adult, she returned to Italy to complete her education, studying fashion, fine arts, and literature at the Accademia di Belle Arti di Brera in Milan. She began her career as a fashion model and later worked in public relations for the British retailer Harrods, appearing in fashion campaigns early in her career. She also participated in advertising campaigns, including promotions for the cigarette brand Primeros, owned by Greek-Argentine businessman Aristotle Onassis.

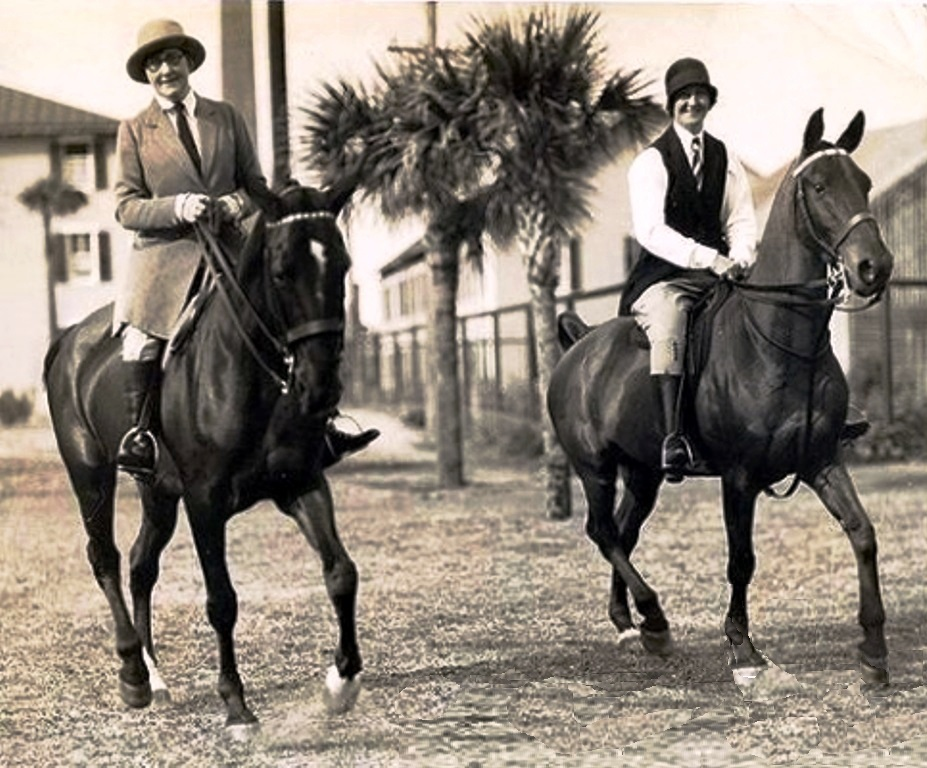
Pelegrina Pastorino and Maria Rosa Oliver, at Hurlingham Club (Argentina), picture taken in 1938 by photographer Shesha Pereyra-Iraola.

=== Journalistic work ===
She began participating in the feminist movement while working at Sur (magazine), a magazine published since 1931 until 2002. Her work with María Rosa Oliver as a multilingual translator provided editorial content supporting recognition of women in the workplace and equality in society at large. She participated in international feminist engagements from her position as private assistant to famous feminist and Argentine writer Victoria Ocampo.

=== Humanitarian work ===
During World War II, Pele took part in humanitarian work in the rescue of women and children exiting Europe by finding them homes in Argentina, Uruguay, and Brazil, as a participant of the International Red Cross and Unesco refugees training assistant program. She was the aunt of famous Argentine actress Malvina Pastorino, and fashion-career mentor to Catherine, Countess Grixoni while working for Harrods.

== Personal life and death ==
Pele married the Argentine essayist Nicolás Barrios-Lynch in the City of Buenos Aires, and they took seasonal residency in La Cumbrecita, a small hamlet in Córdoba, Argentina. She died in Buenos Aires in 1988.
