= Galería Güemes =

Building in Buenos Aires, Argentina

Coordinates: 34.6061°S 58.3750°W

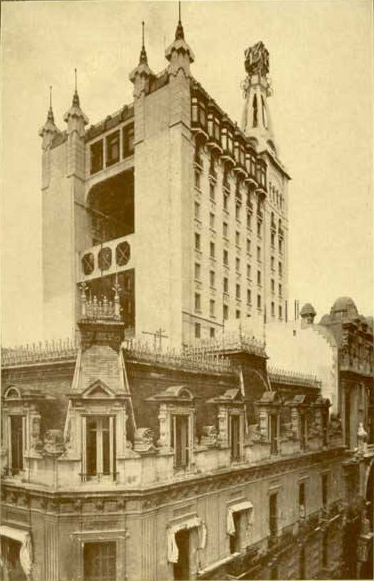
The gallery in 1916

The Galería Güemes is a commercial gallery located on Florida Street in the city of Buenos Aires designed in the art Nouveau style by Italian architect Francesco Gianotti in 1913.

== Gallery ==
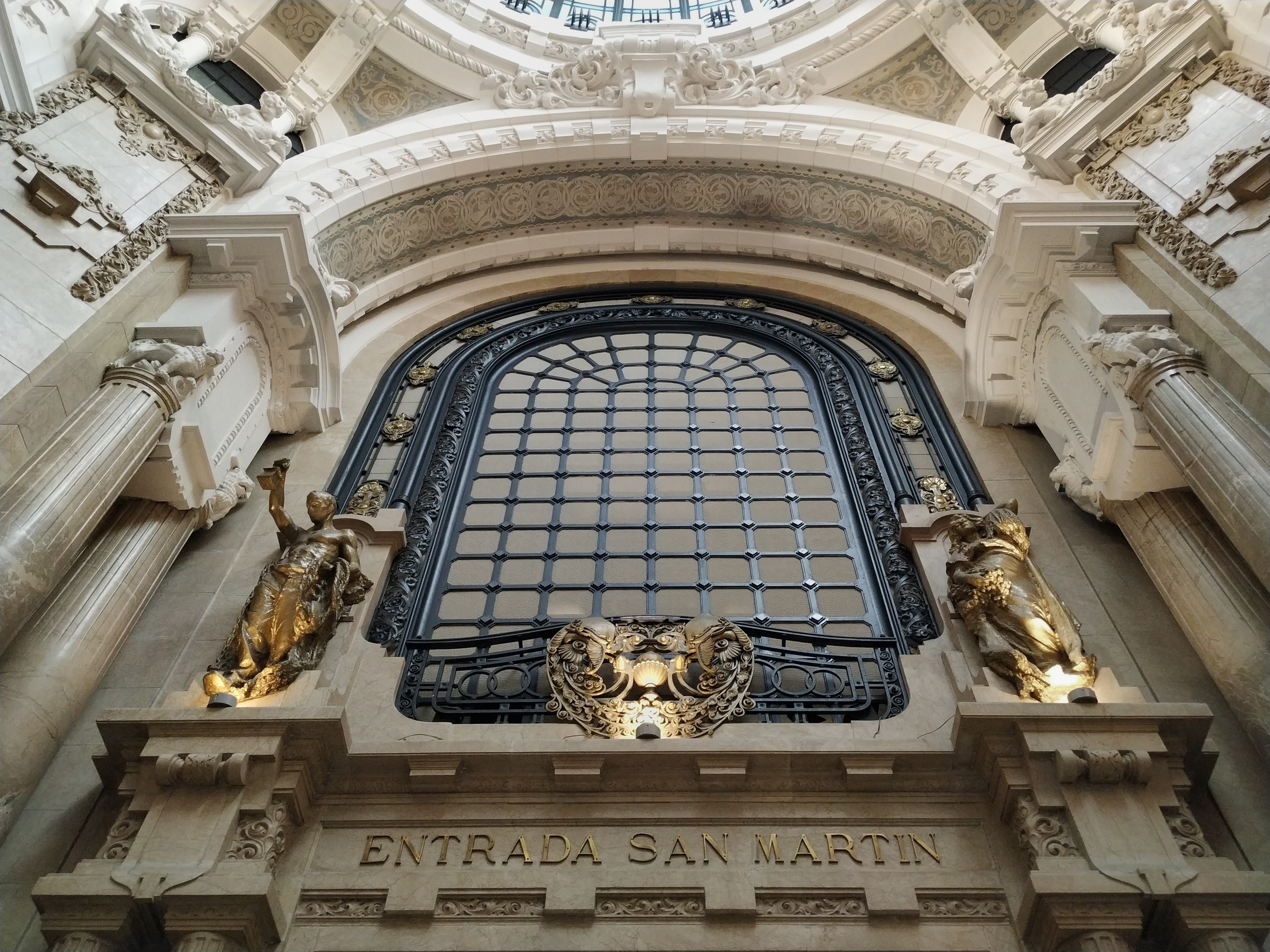

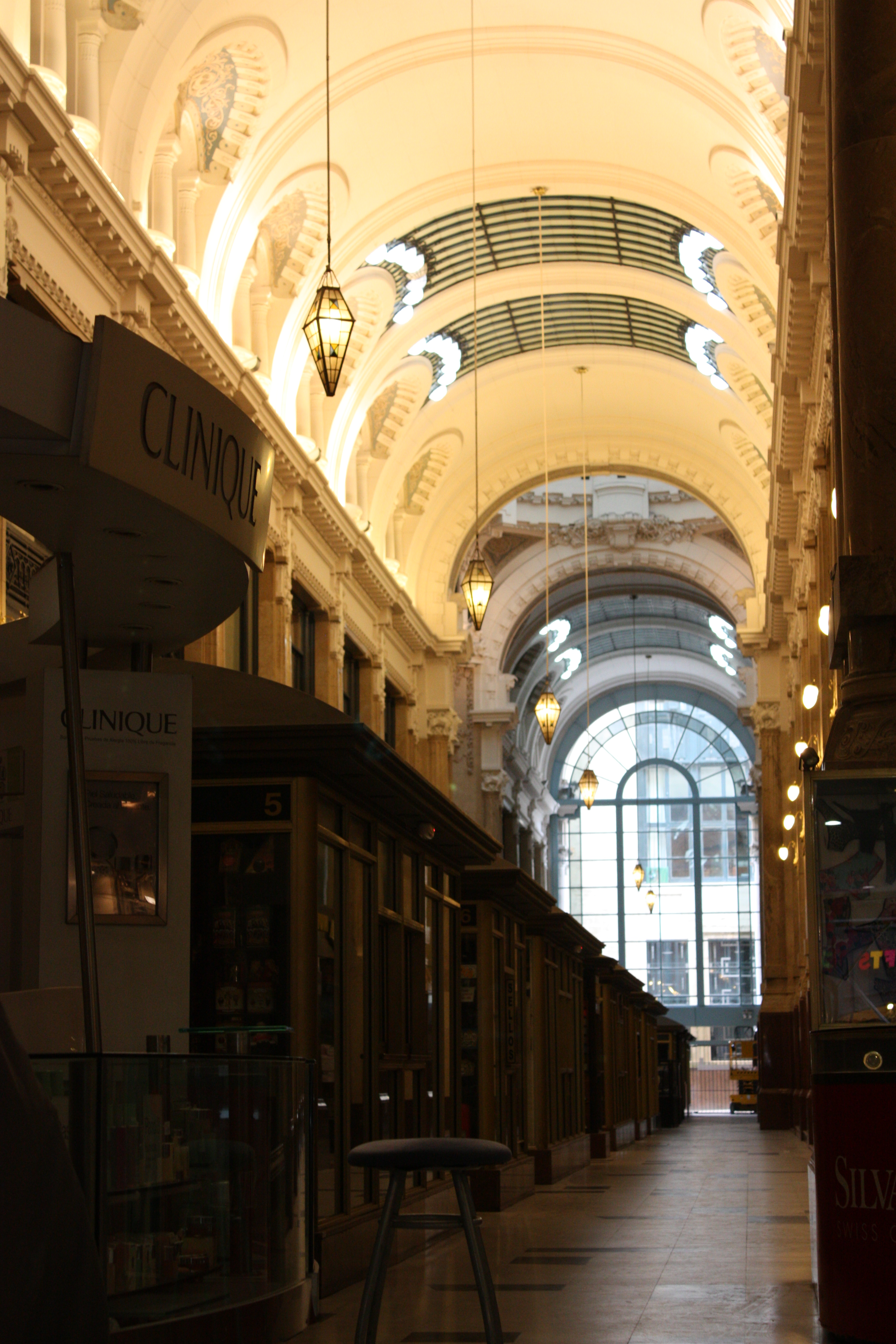

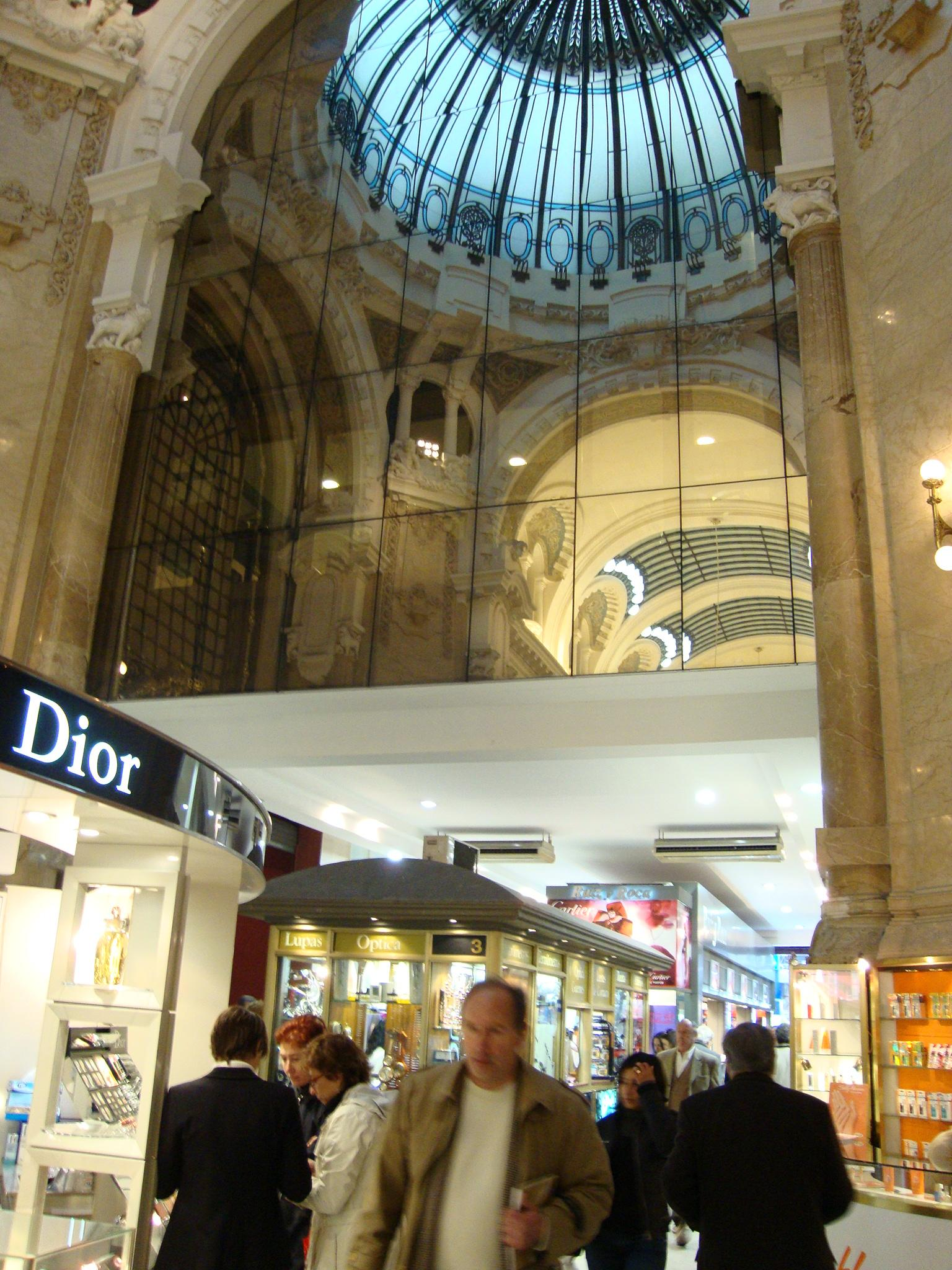

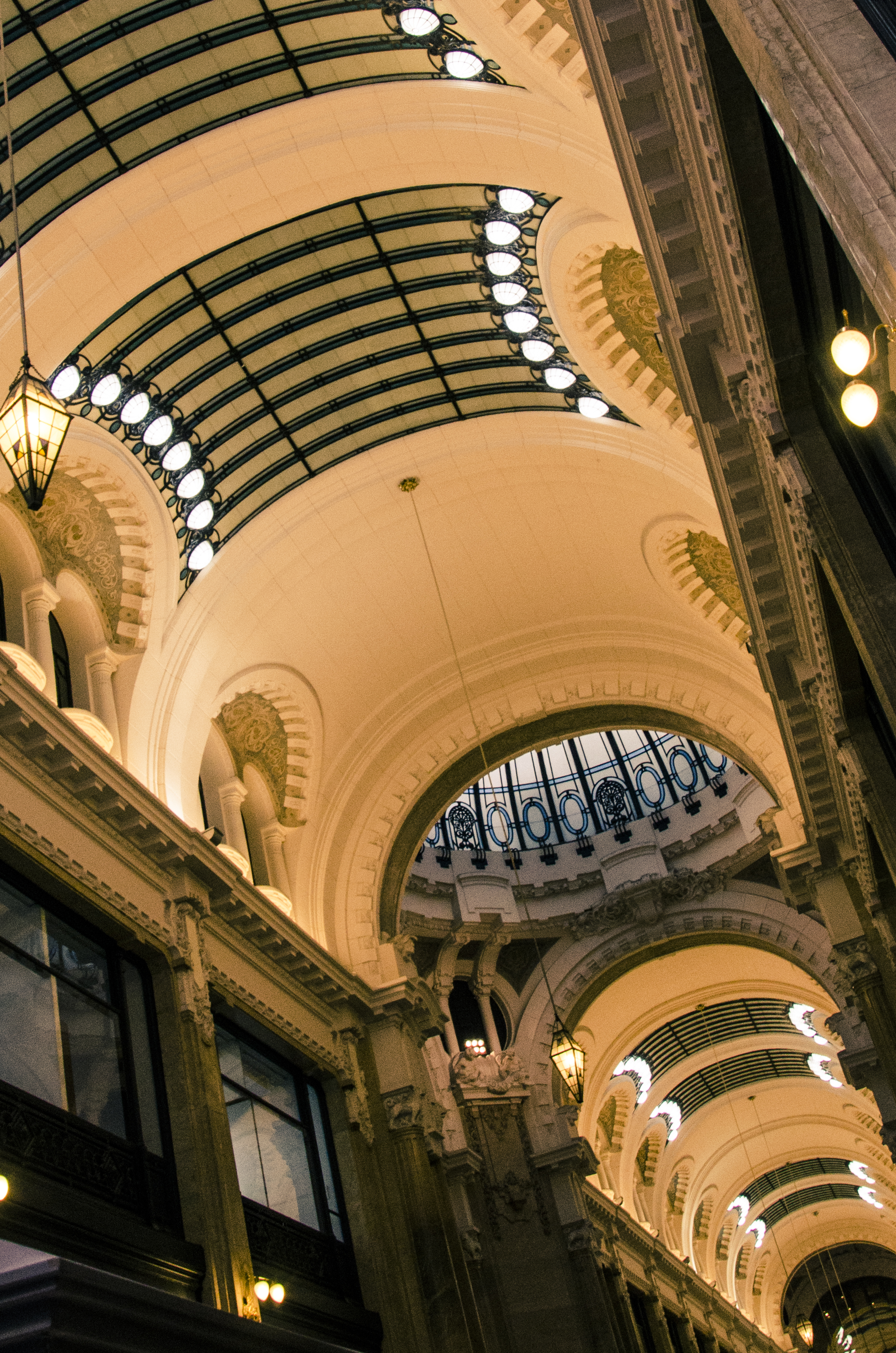

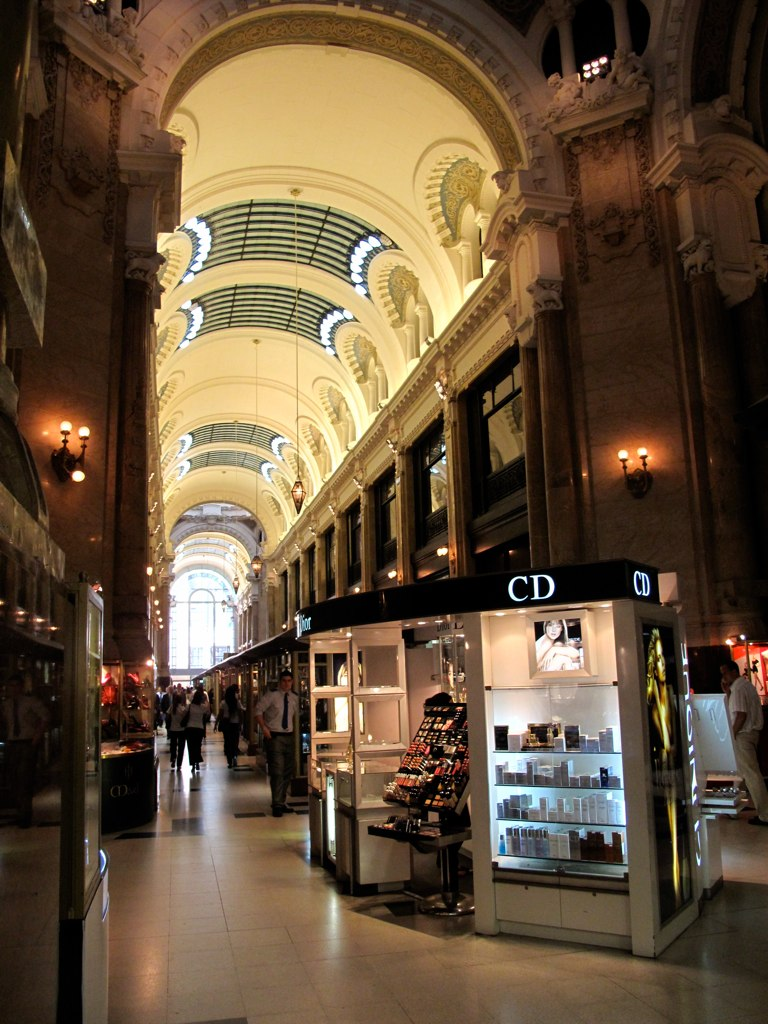

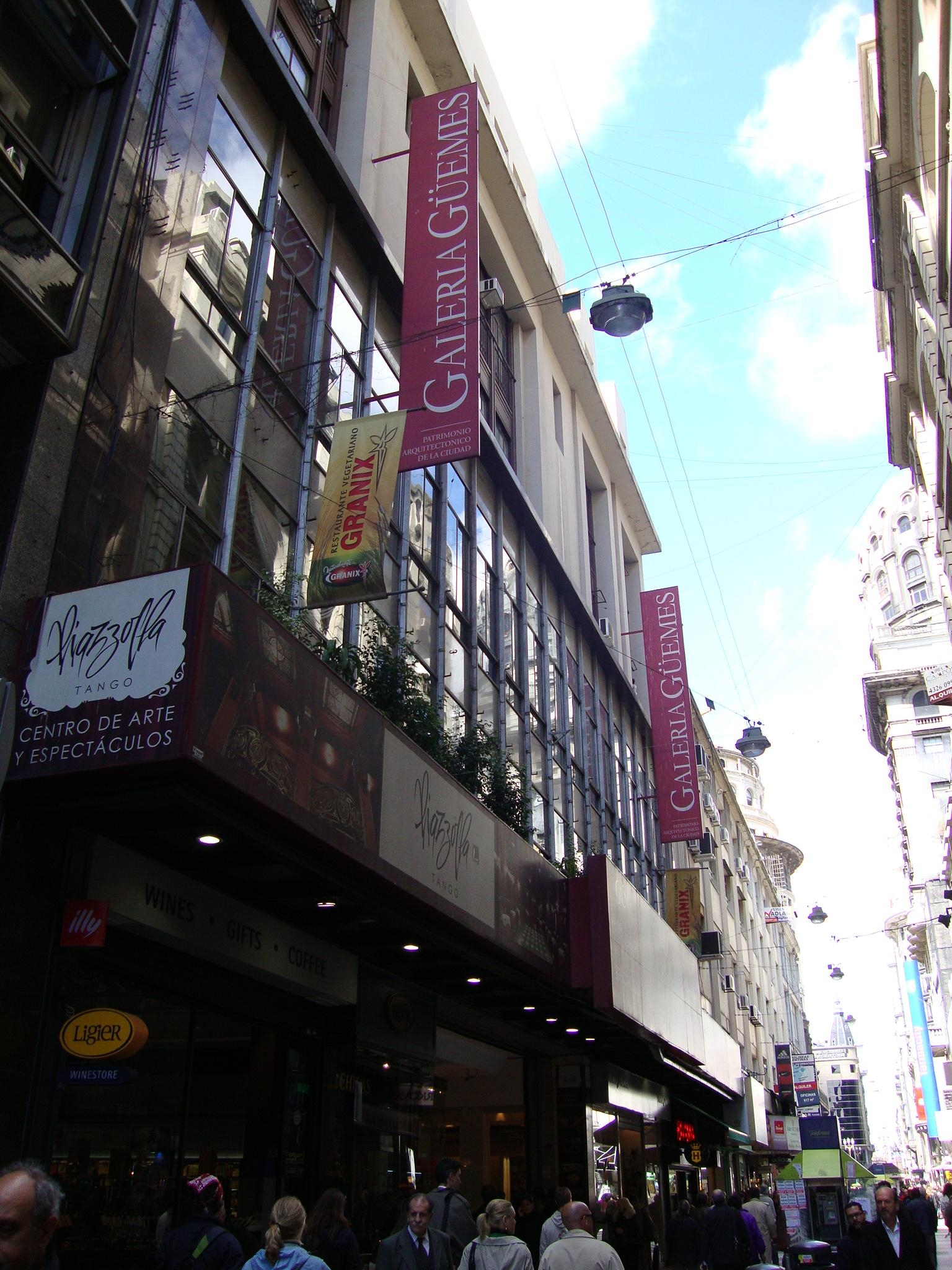

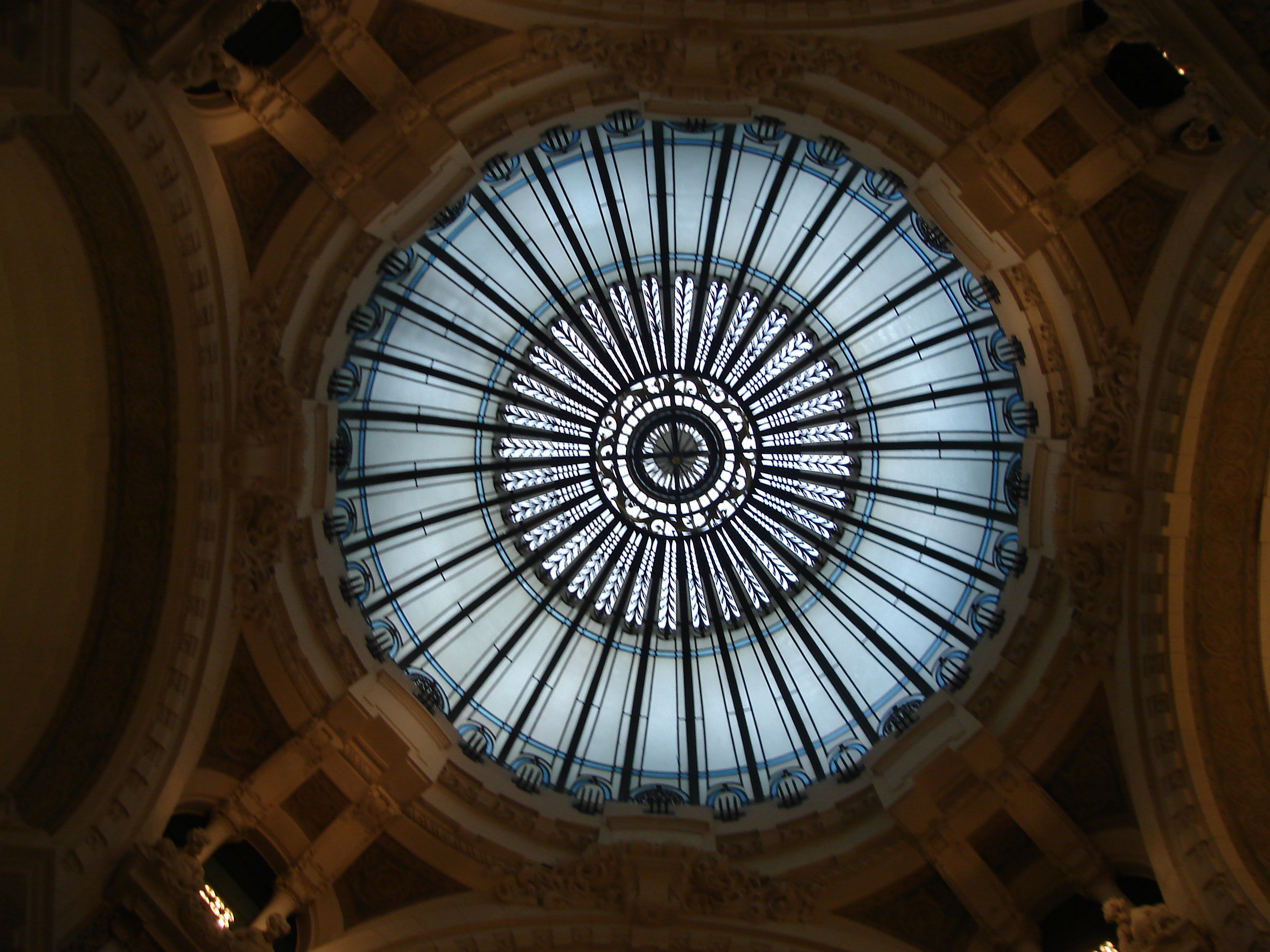
