= Galerías Pacífico =

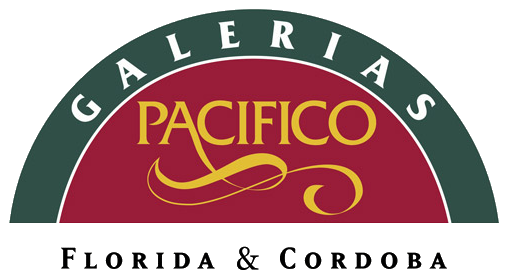

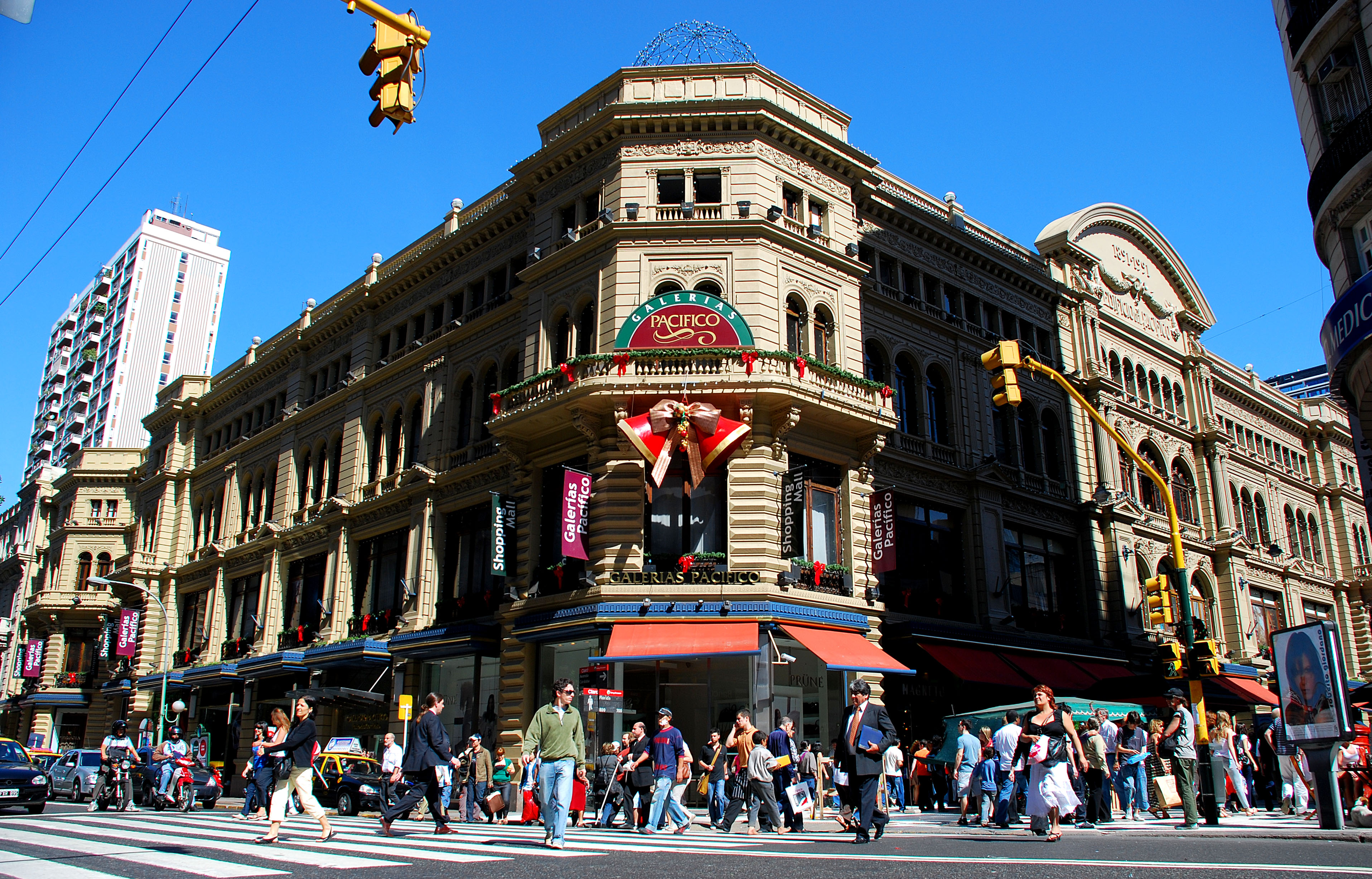
- Façade and main entrance of Galerías Pacífico
- Location: Buenos Aires, Argentina
- Coordinates: 34°35′57″S 58°22′29″W
- Address: Florida St. and Córdoba Avenue
- Opened: 18 May 1992; 34 years ago
- Architect: Juan C. López & Assoc.
- Num. of stores: 150
- Floor area: 11,200 m^{2} (121,000 sq ft)
- Floors: 3
- Website: galeriaspacifico.com.ar

National Historic Monument of Argentina

Galerías Pacífico is a shopping centre in Buenos Aires, Argentina, located at the intersection of Florida Street and Córdoba Avenue.

== Overview ==
The Beaux Arts building was designed by the architects Emilio Agrelo and Roland Le Vacher in 1889 to accommodate a shop called the Argentine Bon Marché, modelled on the Le Bon Marché in Paris.

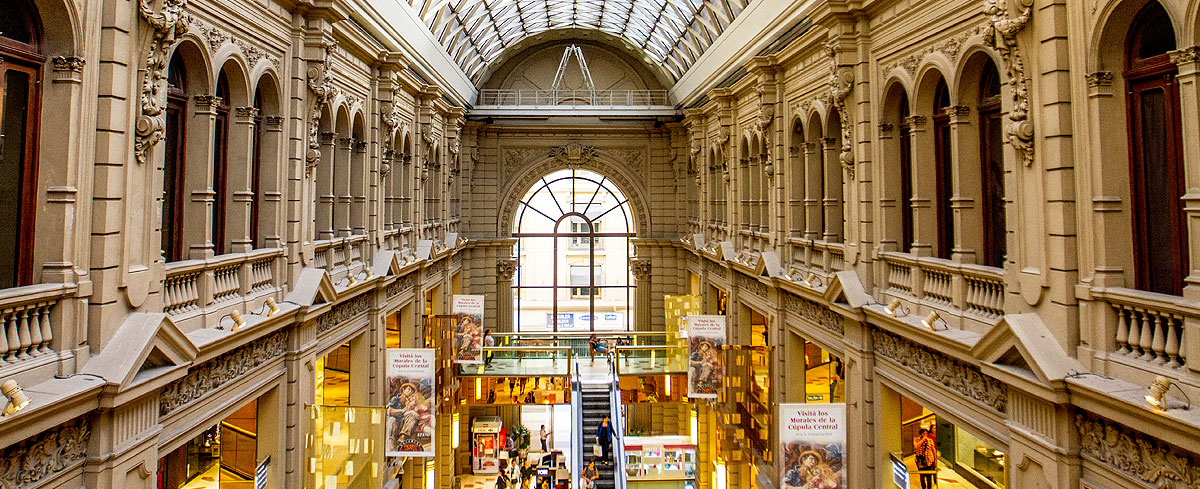
View of one of the interior halls.

In 1896 part of the building was transformed into the first home for the Museo Nacional de Bellas Artes and in 1908 the British-owned Buenos Aires and Pacific railway company acquired part of the building for offices. The company's name derived from the fact that its intention was to operate a train service linking Buenos Aires and Valparaíso in Chile, thereby giving access to the Pacific Ocean. From that time onwards the building became known as Edificio Pacífico.

== Torture chamber ==
In 1987, a film crew uncovered an abandoned torture center in the basement of the building that had been used during the Dirty War.

== See also ==
- Harrods Buenos Aires
