= Harrods Buenos Aires =

Department store in Argentina

Coordinates: 34°35′54″S 58°22′28″W

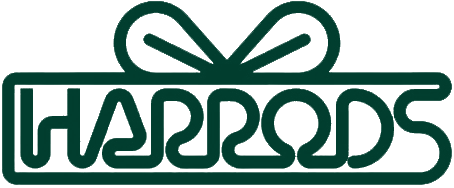

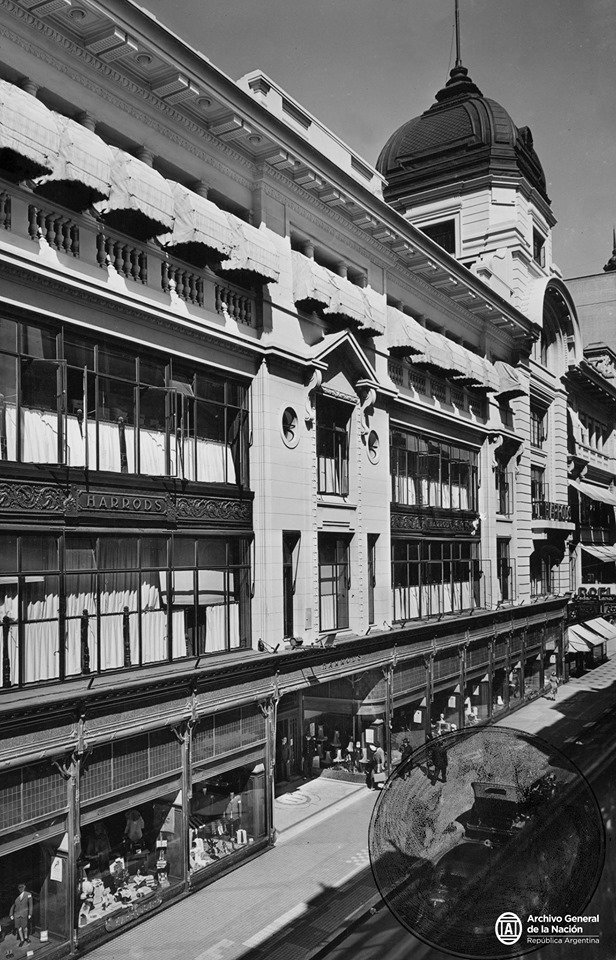
- Harrods building of Buenos Aires in 1939
- Industry: Retail
- Genre: Department store
- Founded: 1914; 112 years ago
- Founder: Charles Henry Harrod
- Defunct: 1998; 28 years ago
- Headquarters: Calle San Martín 900, Buenos Aires, Argentina
- Products: List: clothing; footwear; furniture; hair salon; jewelry; beauty products; housewares; cafe
- Owner: Atilio Gilbertoni (1983–98)
- Parent: Harrods
- Footnotes / references Currently under negotiation for restoration

Harrods Buenos Aires was an Argentine retail company based in Buenos Aires, whose building was located on the corner of Córdoba Avenue and San Martin street. The store was a branch of the famous Harrods of London which was opened in 1849. Harrods Buenos Aires opened in 1912 and closed in 1998. Since its closure, there have been numerous attempts to reopen the store.

== History ==
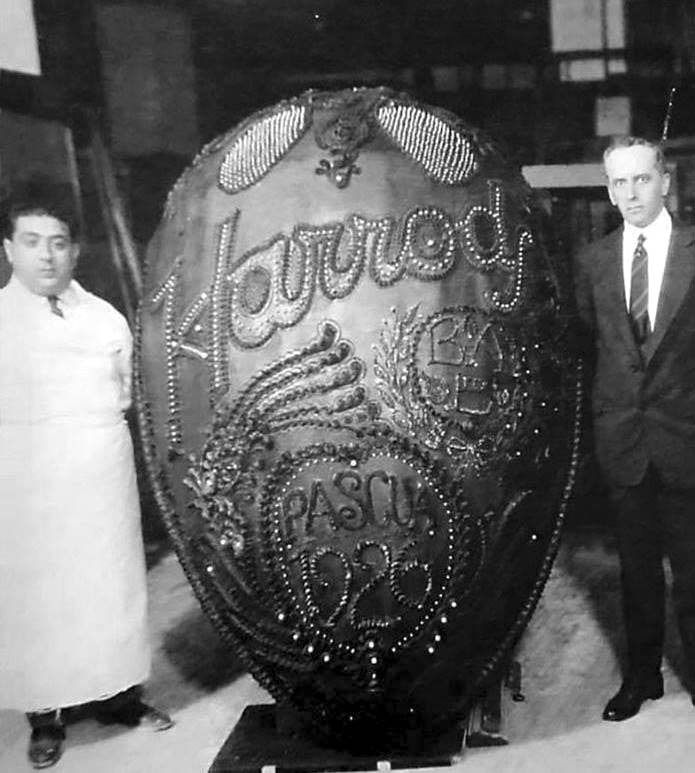
A giant Easter egg made in Harrods, 1926

Established in 1912, a new building was erected in 1914 at 877 Florida Street to a design by the architects Chambers & Thomas. This was the only overseas branch of the renowned Harrods of London. The department store was extended in 1920, and grew to occupy almost an entire Retiro-area city block. Following its expansion, the 47,000 m^{2} (500,000 ft²) landmark was crowned by an eighth-story cupola overlooking Córdoba Avenue, and featured marble steps and cedar flooring throughout, as well as wrought-iron elevators with a riding capacity for twenty, valet service, and a jazz orchestra. The store was purchased by competing local retailer Gath & Chaves in 1922, and the two Florida Street institutions were, in turn, acquired by the Italian-Argentine holding company, Almacenes Argentinos, in 1970.

These latter owners closed Gath y Chaves in 1974, and in 1977, sold their interest in the remaining store (Harrods) to a consortium led by Pérez Companc, a prominent local conglomerate. By 1983, the store was controlled by Atilio Gilbertoni, its former general manager under Pérez Companc, and Swiss venture capital firm CBC Interconfianz.

=== Store closure ===
In 1989 the main store in Knightsbridge was purchased by Mohamed Al-Fayed and this led to conflict after Gilbertoni refused an offer from Al-Fayed for the local Harrods License. The legal struggles of the store and faltering local economy led to the closure of the stores top floors after Argentina's 1989 currency crisis. In 1998 Al-Fayed's lawsuit was dismissed by the British House of Lords and even though the store received 80,000 customers a day and an average of a million US dollars in daily sales, the stores debts resulted in the historic retailers closure at the end of 1998. Atilio Gilbertoni avoided takeover of the store rejecting numerous offers from retailers including Falabella, El Corte Inglés, Printemps and more.

=== Possible reopening and building restoration ===
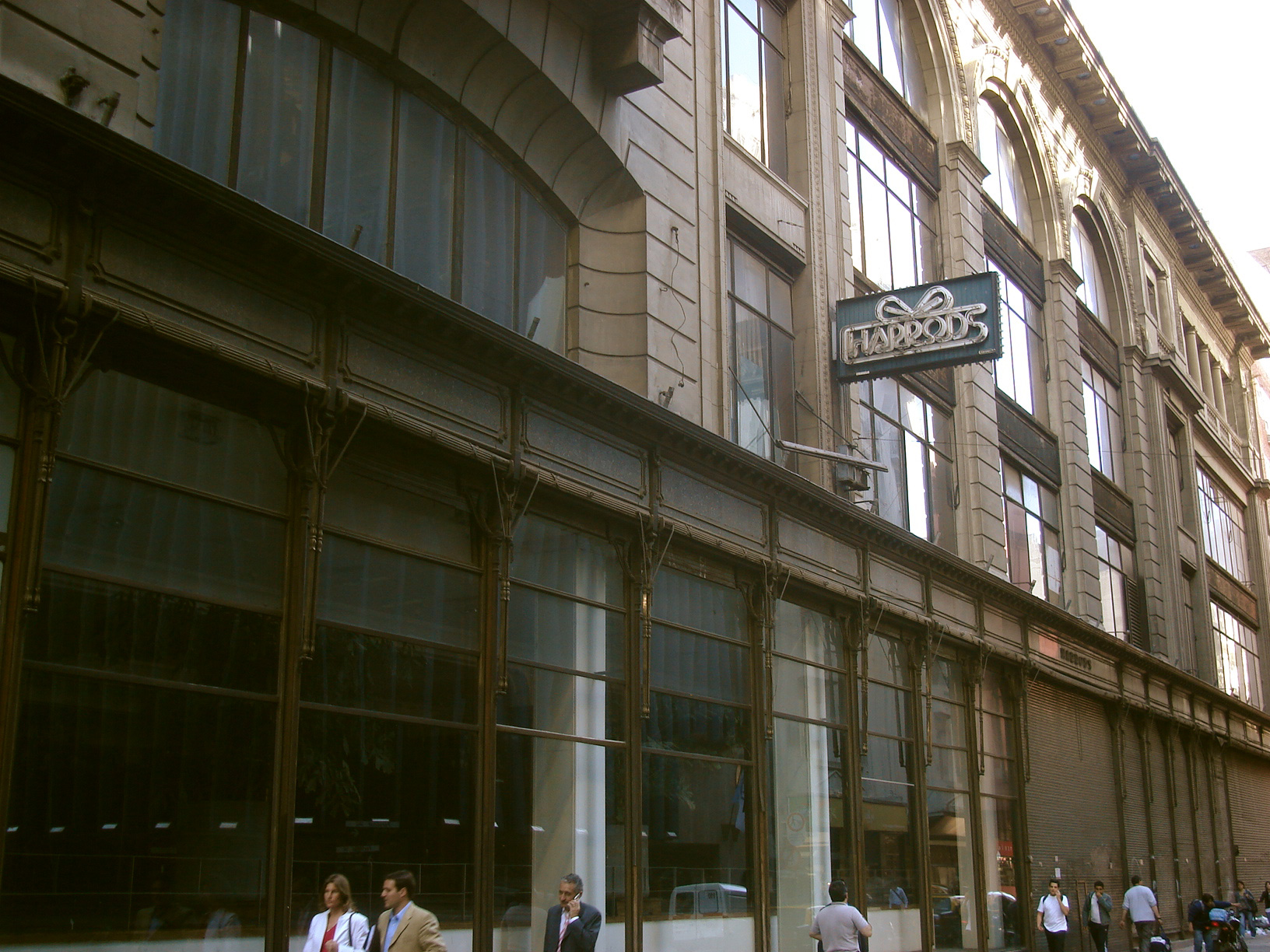
Abandoned Harrods building as seen in 2006

In 2003 the interior was partially restored and reopened in 2003 to host periodic art festivals and other cultural events, in 2008 & 2009 the 10th & 11th Buenos Aires Tango Festival's were held in the restored zone.

Representatives from CBC Interconfianz announced in March 2009 that permits had been filed with city authorities to fully refurbish Harrods Buenos Aires (which can presently operate under that name only in Argentina), and to reopen the landmark department store.

A project to restore the entire store and reopen Harrods was approved in 2010 with a planned opening date of 2013. The reopened store was planned to have a tearoom and five floors of sales space then above that four floors of offices and a hotel.

In 2019 it was revealed that the store building would be renovated and turned into co-working and co-living spaces which would include the restoration of the building which would take three years and cost $60 million.

== See also ==
- Galerías Pacífico
