= Raúl González Tuñón =

Argentine poet and writer

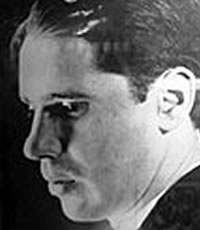
Raúl González Tuñón

Raúl González Tuñón (29 March 1905 – 14 August 1974) was an Argentine poet and writer from Buenos Aires. He also worked as a journalist, notably for the journal Crítica, and was known for his social activism and his socialist beliefs. He was a great friend of the Chilean poet and Nobel laureate Pablo Neruda. His first book of poetry, El violín del diablo, was published by the well-known Buenos Aires publishing house Editorial Gleizer in 1926, and Gleizer then published many of his later works.

He also wrote at least one poem about the militant anarchist, Buenaventura Durruti.
