= Conrado Nalé Roxlo =

Argentine writer, journalist and humorist

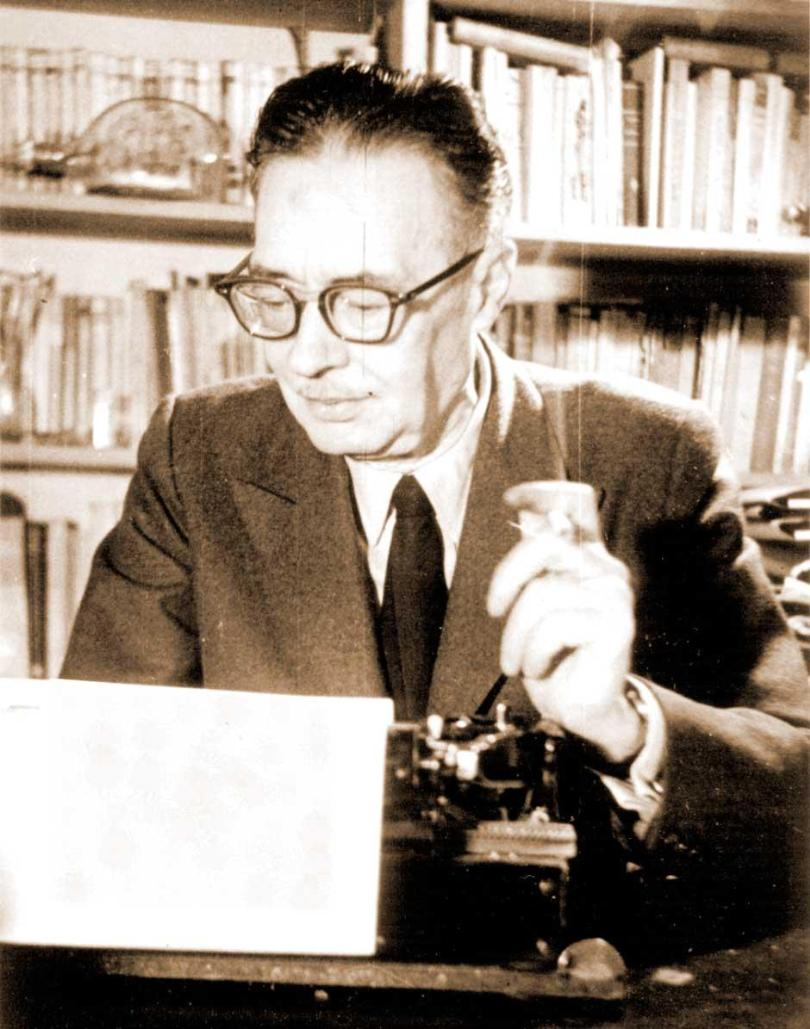
- Born: February 15, 1897; Buenos Aires, Argentina
- Died: July 2, 1971 (aged 73); Buenos Aires, Argentina
- Occupations: playwright, screenwriter, humorist, poet, journalist
- Writing career
- Pen name: Chamico, Alguien
- Genres: satire, children's literature, poetry, biographies
- Notable works: Las puertas del purgatorio El cuervo del arca El grillo

Conrado Nalé Roxlo (February 15, 1898 – July 2, 1971) was an Argentine writer, journalist and humorist from Buenos Aires. He published poetry, short stories, plays, film scripts, prose pastiches, and other works and was the editor of two humor magazines and a newspaper literary supplement. He won the Premio Nacional de Teatro (National Prize for Theatre) and the Premio Nacional de Letras (National Prize for Literature) and was a member of the Academia Argentina de Letras.

== Life ==
Roxlo was born on 15 February 1898 in Buenos Aires to a Uraguayan family of French and Spanish descent. He studied at the Facultad de Filosofía y Letras in Buenos Aires. In 1925, he married Teresa de la Fuente. In addition to his writing, he worked as a French translator and at the newspaper El Mundo, where he contributed a weekly series of memoirs. He died in Buenos Aires on 2 July 1971.

== Career ==
His first poetry collection, El Grillo (the cricket), was published in 1923. The title poem brought him immediate fame and the book won the Babel publishing house prize. He published only two more collections, Claro desvelo in 1937 and De otro cielo in 1952, but although his poetic output was small, it was critically praised.

His first play was La Cola de la Sirena (1941). It received the Premio Nacional de Teatro, as did his later plays Una viuda difícil and El pacto de Cristina.

He published a single novel, Extraño accidente (strange accident) (1960). His book of short stories Las puertas del purgatorio (The Purgatory Gates), was awarded the Premio Nacional de Letras in 1955.

He produced many humorous short pieces under the pseudonyms Chamico and Alguien. Many of these were compiled in collections including Cuentos de Chamico (1941), Cuentos de cabecera (1946), and Mi pueblo (1953).

He edited a humorous weekly, Don Goyo, a satirical weekly for doctors, Esculapión, and the literary supplement of the newspaper Crítica.

He also wrote children's literature and, with Mabel Mármol, biographies of Amadeo Villar (1963) and Alfonsina Storni (1965).
