= Francisco Luis Bernárdez =

Argentine poet

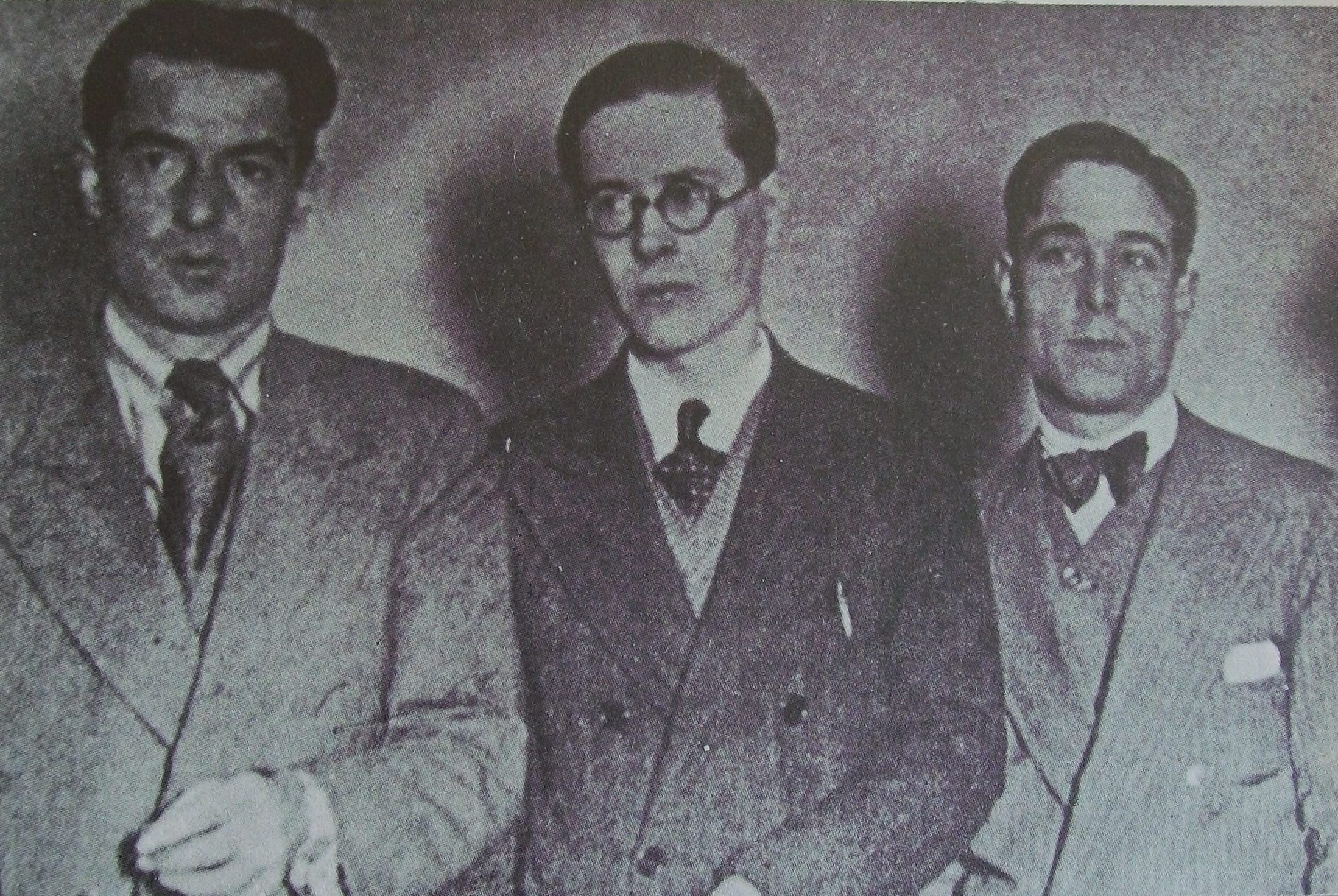
Roberto Arlt, Francisco Luis Bernardez and Roberto Ledesma (1930)

Francisco Luis Bernárdez (5 October 1900 – 24 October 1978) was an Argentine poet, born in Buenos Aires.

He lived in Spain from 1920 until 1924, where he read the modernist poets that influenced in his first books, and he also worked as a journalist in Vigo.

When he came back from Spain he joined the Martín Fierro group, which played an important part in the literary and aesthetical renovation of Argentine literature.

Later he worked in La Nación newspaper, and joined Criterio magazine. In 1937 he was named Public Library Secretary, and in 1944, General Director of Intellectual Culture of the Justice and Public Proceedings Ministry. Four years later, he entered the Academia Argentina de Letras. Finally, he was incorporated to the foreign service of Argentina, as a council of the Argentine embassy in Madrid, until 1960.

His first works, Orto (Dawn, 1922) and Bazar (Bazaar, 1922), written following the principles of ultraism, along with Alcándara (Perch, 1935), connected him to the postmodernist era, but since the publication of El buque (The Ship, 1935), he dealt with religious subjects with the classic style of Paul Claudel and Charles Péguy. This new phase is represented by works like Cielo de tierra (Earth Sky, 1937), La ciudad sin Laura (The Laura-less City, 1938), Poemas elementales (Elementary Poems, 1942), Poemas de carne y hueso (Flesh and Blood Poems, 1943), El ruiseñor (The Nightingale, 1945), Las estrellas (The Stars, 1947), El ángel de la guarda (The Guardian Angel, 1949), Poemas nacionales (National Poems, 1950), La flor (The Flower, 1951), Tres poemas católicos (Three Catholic Poems, 1959), Poemas de cada día (Everyday Poems, 1963) and La copa de agua (The Cup of Water, 1963).
