= Argentine literature =

Aspect of argentine culture

Argentine literature, i.e. the set of literary works produced by writers who originated from Argentina, is one of the most prolific, relevant and influential in the whole Spanish speaking world, with renowned writers such as Jorge Luis Borges, Julio Cortázar, Leopoldo Lugones and Ernesto Sábato.

== History ==
=== Origins ===
As a matter of fact, the name of the country itself comes from a Latinism which first appeared in a literary source: Martin del Barco Centenera's epic poem La Argentina (1602). This composition runs 10.000 verses and describes the landscape as well as the conquest of the territory. The word was reintroduced in Argentina manuscrita, a prose chronicle by Ruy Díaz de Guzmán.

Argentine literature began around 1550 with the work of Matías Rojas de Oquendo and Pedro González de Prado (from Santiago del Estero, the first important urban settlement in Argentina), who wrote prose and poetry. They were partly inspired by oral aboriginal poetry—in particular, according to Carlos Abregú Virreyra, by the lules, juríes, diaguitas and tonocotés. A symbiosis emerged between the aboriginal and Spanish traditions, creating a distinct literature, geographically limited (well into the 18th century) to the Argentine north and central regions, with the province of Córdoba as its center, due to the foundation of the National University of Córdoba. Two names stand out from this period: Gaspar Juárez Baviano, and Antonia de la Paz y Figueroa, also known as "Beata Antula".

Gradually, with the economic prosperity of the port, the cultural axis moved eastward. The letters of the colonial age (Viceroyalty-neoclassicism, baroque and epic) grew under the protection of the independentist fervor: Vicente López y Planes, Pantaleón Rivarola and Esteban de Luca.

During the 17th century, Argentine baroque literature was poor in comparison with that from Europe and some other parts of the New World. The only remarkable poet of this period was Fray José Luis de Tejeda who wrote Coronas líricas and El peregrino de Babilonia

=== Cultural independence from Spain ===
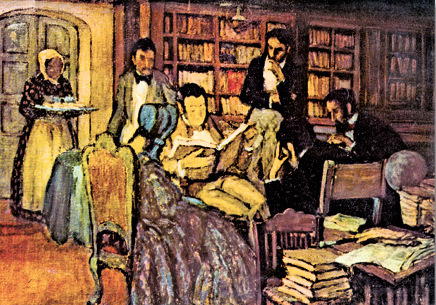
The salon of the 1837 generation.

As in the rest of the continent, strong feelings of emancipation from Spain were present in Argentina. Before independence, some neoclassical authors such as Juan Cruz Varela produced numerous works related with this revolutionary spirit but still under the paradoxical Spanish domain.

Argentina's true break with Spanish tradition was manifested in literature through the adoption of French romanticism as a model, postulating the return to popular sources and to the medieval. This aesthetic and intellectual was brought by Esteban Echeverría who wrote the first local and realistic story, El Matadero ("The slaughterhouse"), as well as the nativist poem La Cautiva ("The Captive"), with the Pampas as its background. His barbed wit and opposition to powerful Buenos Aires governor Juan Manuel de Rosas forced him into exile.

In the middle of the 19th century José Mármol published the first Argentine novel, Amalia (1851–1852), a historical novel set during the dark year of 1840 which mixed fictional characters (Amalia, Daniel Bello, Eduardo Belgrano) with actual historical characters like Juan Manuel de Rosas.

As Rosas' power increased, more literary works from the opposition were produced, such as Juan Bautista Alberdi's play El Gigante Amapolas, a good example of local sainete. In the genre of essay, Domingo Faustino Sarmiento published his Facundo, a particular (re)vision of Facundo Quiroga's life from a deterministic point of view. Sarmiento conveyed aspects of sociology and semiotics in this analysis.

Echeverría, Mármol and Sarmiento are among the group of writers known as Generación del 37, who are considered the first generation of local intellectuals.

Poetry lessened in combative spirit and turned towards the anecdotal and sentimental: Carlos Guido y Spano and Ricardo Gutiérrez, the chronicle writers of folk literature. Lucio V. Mansilla published in 1870 Una excursión a los indios ranqueles, a sort of chronicle of a voluntary expedition to sign a peace treaty with the Indians. His work (enrolled in a realistic aesthetic) anticipated Generación del '80, which would be deeply influenced by modernism. Juana Manuela Gorriti was one of the first popular female writers, mainly due to her melodramatic narrative works like the novel La hija del mazorquero and the foundation of La alborada, a cultural magazine.

=== Generation of 1837 ===
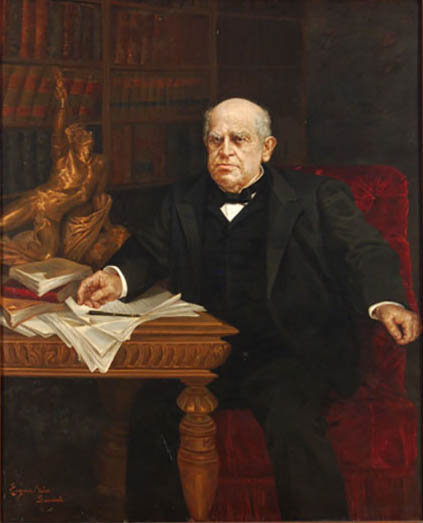
Domingo Faustino Sarmiento, author of Facundo (1845)

Marcos Sastre, a bookseller in the city of Buenos Aires, offered in 1837 a room in his "Librería Argentina" to serve as a literary salon, where meetings of intellectual reading and discussion groups were held. The inaugural session took place in June 1837.

The first narrative often considered "foundational" by many critics was written before the mid-19th century by Esteban Echeverría (1805–1851), a liberal writer and politician associated with Romanticism and the so-called Generation of '37. His short story The Slaughter Yard, which depicts a brutal scene of torture and murder in the slaughterhouses of Buenos Aires, is notable for its realism, which was unusual for the time. As noted by Carlos Gamerro, Echeverría's writing engages with symbolic violence associated with the mazorqueros, and he also recalls the well-known phrase by David Viñas referring to this story: "Argentine literature begins with a rape".

From its beginnings, Argentine literature has been closely tied to political context. At that time, Argentine society was divided into two factions: Unitarians and Federalists. This conflict is reflected in El matadero and many other works. On this basis, David Viñas stated: "Argentine literature begins with Rosas".

=== Literatura Gauchesca ===
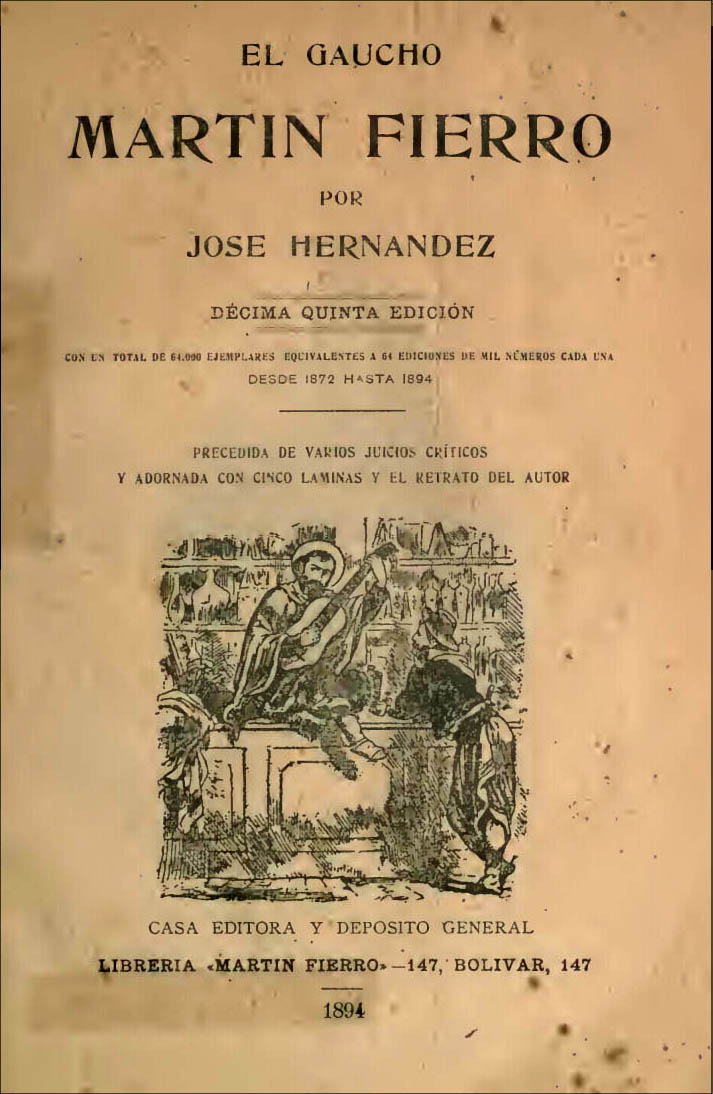
Cover of Martín Fierro by José Hernández, 1894 edition.

European-oriented, indeed Euro-centric, themes and styles would remain the norm in Argentine letters, especially from Buenos Aires, during this century. The (romantic) poetry as La cautiva or the latter Santos Vega by Rafael Obligado gave a lot of importance to the nature of the pampa, sharing some elements with a picturesque, imitation-gaucho literature, purporting to use the language of the gauchos and to reflect their mentality. The first current is known as poesía nativista (nativist poetry) and became a literary tradition. The second (known as poesía gauchesca) developed in parallel as a part of that generation's understanding of national identity. Although it also is a product of literary authors, this writing takes the voice of the gaucho as protagonist from the beginning. Gauchesca is related to payador's singing, a payador being a modern equivalent of the illiterate medieval singers. A payador's work, in opposition to gauchesca, is sung spontaneously.

The first gauchesco author was Bartolomé Hidalgo who wrote during the war of independence and therefore his works had a strong political ideology. His compositions were mainly cielitos (payadoresque songs but with provocative political messages) and diálogos patrióticos (conversations between two characters about current affairs).

In a second period, gauchesca was influenced by political-faction fights. Estanislao del Campo, and Hilario Ascasubi are the most representative writers of this period. Del Campo wrote Fausto, a poem which has been read both as a parody of gauchesca and an intelligent joke towards city people. In the poem, Anastasio El Pollo meets a friend and tells him his impressions on particular event: he has seen the Devil. What El Pollo doesn't know (or pretends he doesn't) is that all he saw was actually an opera performance at Teatro Colón.

The last author of gauchesca is José Hernández, the author of Martín Fierro. Gauchesca leaves its political influences and becomes social in the sense that gauchos are disappearing, mainly due to Sarmiento and the new economic model. Hernández is considered the responsible for consolidating the gauchesco style.

==== Martín Fierro ====
Martín Fierro is a narrative poem by José Hernández, considered an exemplary work of the gaucho literature genre in Argentina and Uruguay. It was first published in 1872 under the title El Gaucho Martín Fierro, and its sequel, La vuelta de Martín Fierro, appeared in 1879.

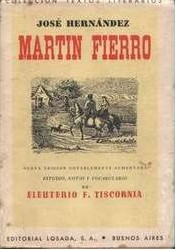
First edition cover

The poem portrays the independent, heroic, and resilient character of the gaucho. It is also, in part, a protest against the Europeanizing and modernizing tendencies of Argentine president Domingo Faustino Sarmiento.

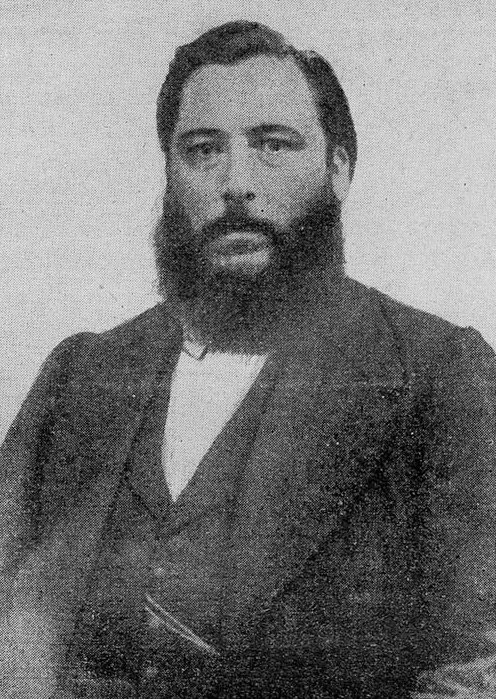
José Hernández

=== Generation of 1880 ===
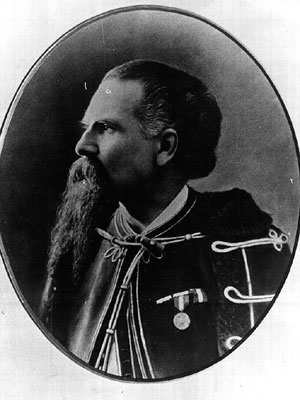
Lucio V. Mansilla in 1865

The Generation of the '80 (Spanish: Generación del '80) was a group of Argentine intellectuals and writers active around the 1880s. Figures such as Lucio V. Mansilla and Miguel Cané drew on their European experiences to establish a new intellectual cycle grounded in Argentine criteria.

In 1880, two major political and social events took place in Argentina: on 20 September, the federalization of the city of Buenos Aires was approved, and on 12 October Julio Argentino Roca assumed the presidency. This marked the beginning of a period of prosperity and relative stability, during which foreign investment increased significantly. The arrival of large numbers of immigrants—Italian, Spanish, French, Polish, Russian, Jewish, and German—between 1870 and 1910 brought about substantial changes in Argentine society.

Within this context, the generation looked toward Europe while maintaining a strong national orientation. As noted by Alicia M. Zorrilla de Rodríguez, although “eyes were set on Europe,” the Generation of the '80 was not merely Europeanizing, but rather expressed an intense patriotic sentiment rooted in local identity.

The interests of this generation extended beyond literature and journalism to include politics, diplomacy, and the military. Through their works, these authors sought to recover the past in order to compare it with the present, reflecting on the transformation of Buenos Aires under the forces of modernization.

Notable works associated with this perspective include La gran aldea and Costumbres bonaerenses (1882) by Lucio Vicente López; Juvenilia (1884) by Miguel Cané; Retratos y recuerdos (1894) by Lucio V. Mansilla; and Aguas abajo by Eduardo Wilde. Another aim of these writers was to depict social reality in order to denounce its problems, often employing naturalist techniques.

The generation of 1880 emphasized the European color and cultural supremacy of Buenos Aires. The migratory current of mixed ethnicity accentuated the change of the big village for the cosmopolitan metropolis. The poetry of this period is lyric: Leopoldo Díaz y Almafuerte. The latter usually depicts the worker's life in passionate attacks against the contradictions of contemporary society. Almafuerte (pseudonym of Pedro Bonifacio Palacios) was also a teacher and a journalist whose opinions and articles gave him a lot of problems.

Essay is a genre that developed in the late 19th century: José Manuel Estrada, Pedro Goyena and Joaquín V. González.

Narrative works oscillated between social issues and folk literature. The predominant tendency was Realism, best represented by Miguel Cané in his autobiographical novel Juvenilia. Other writers influenced by realism were Lucio V. Mansilla, Francisco Sicardi, Benito Lynch and Carlos María Ocantos. Naturalism was also an important tendency towards the end of the century. Argentine Naturalism was commanded by Eugenio Cambaceres in his novels Sin rumbo and Música sentimental, almost forgotten today. Cambaceres was inspired by Émile Zola's theory about the naturalistic approach to literary work, but its ideology suffered considerable alterations. Julián Martel and Antonio Argerich with ¿Inocentes o culpables? added a highly loaded moral touch to Argentine naturalism.

=== Modern ===
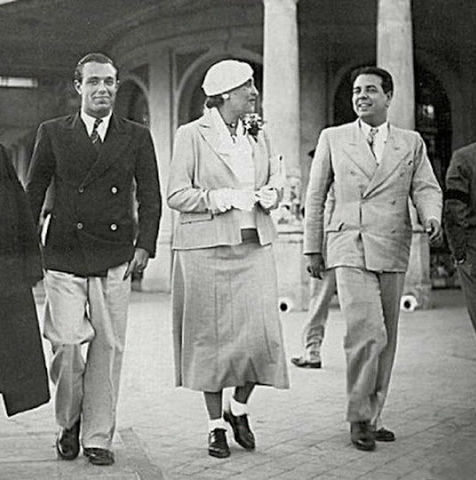
Adolfo Bioy Casares, Victoria Ocampo and Jorge Luis Borges in Mar del Plata, 1935.

Towards the end of the 19th century, led by the Nicaraguan Rubén Darío, modernism appears in Latin American literature. Preciosity of manner and a strong influence from Symbolism sum up the new genre, which inspires the clearest voice in poetry, Leopoldo Lugones, who was the author of the first Argentine science fiction story. The first truly modern generation in Argentine literature is the Martinfierristas (c. 1922). The movement contributes an intellectual doctrine in which a number of current trends come together: the trend represented by the Florida group, adscript to ultraísmo, with Oliverio Girondo, Jorge Luis Borges, Leopoldo Marechal and Macedonio Fernández; and the trend of Boedo, impressed by Russian realism, with Raúl González Tuñón, César Tiempo y Elías Catelnuovo. Ricardo Güiraldes, however, remains classical in style, giving a whole new freshness to gauchesca poetry and writing what is perhaps the novel, Don Segundo Sombra.

Benito Lynch (1885–1951), an eccentric short-story writer who, like Güiraldes, does not easily fit into any "generation", wrote his quirky tales in an enchanted neo-gauchoesque manner about this time. Between the end of this decade and the beginning of the following one emerged the Novísimos ("Newest"), a generation of poets (Arturo Cambours Ocampo, Carlos Carlino and José Portogalo), fiction writers (Arturo Cerretani, Roberto Arlt, Luis Maria Albamonte and Luis Horacio Velázquez) and playwrights (Roberto Valenti, Juan Oscar Ponferrada and Javier Villafañe). The group promoted philosophical reflection and a new essence for Argentinidad. Leopoldo Marechal's novel Adán Buenosayres, published in 1948 and praised by Julio Cortázar in 1949.

Also worthy of note is the literary work of Leonardo Castellani (1899–1981), a Jesuit priest who left a considerable bulk of essays, novels, tales and poetry. Expelled from the Company of Jesus, the outspoken Castellani was also widely ignored – like his contemporary Marechal – by the literary intelligentsia of his time due to his nationalist ideology.

=== Generation of 1937 ===
The Generation of 1937 centers on poetry, where it developed the descriptive, nostalgic and meditative in the work of Ricardo E. Molinari, Vicente Barbieri, Olga Orozco, León Benarós and Alfonso Sola Gonzáles. Fiction writers subscribed to idealism and magic realism, María Granata, Adolfo Bioy Casares, Julio Cortázar, Silvina Ocampo) or to a subtler form of realism Manuel Mujica Laínez, Ernesto L. Castro, Ernesto Sabato and Abelardo Arias) with some urban touches, as well as folk literature (Joaquín Gómez Bas and Roger Plá).

Essayists do not abound. Antonio Pagés Larraya, Emilio Carilla, Luis Soler Cañas are some of the few who stand out, although the greatest Argentine essayist after Sarmiento – Ezequiel Martínez Estrada – also belonged to the Generation of '37. Many of these writers and a number of European ones contributed extensively to Sur, a literary journal published by Victoria Ocampo, a noted commentator on the day's culture.

=== Neohumanism, Existentialism and other influences ===
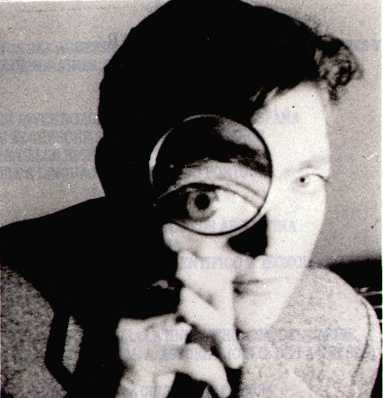
Julio Cortázar in 1967, photograph by Sara Facio.

In 1950, another milestone arose: the New Humanism, a response to World War II and its aftermath. On one level are avant-gardists like Raúl Gustavo Aguirre, Edgar Bayley and Julio Llinás; on another, existentialists: José Isaacson, Julio Arístides and Miguel Ángel Viola. Further away are those who reconcile both tendencies with a regionalist tendency: Alfredo Veiravé, Jaime Dávalos and Alejandro Nicotra. Other fiction writers left a highly charged testimony of the times: Beatriz Guido, David Viñas, Marco Denevi and Silvina Bullrich. In a majority of the writers, a strong influence of Anglo-Saxon and Italian poetry can be perceived. Of particular interest are the poetic works of two of Marechal's disciples, the poets Rafael Squirru and Fernando Demaría.

A new trend started in 1960, continuing until about 1990. Its influences are heterogeneous: Sartre, Camus, Éluard; some Spanish writers, like Camilo José Cela; and previous Argentine writers like Borges, Arlt, Cortázar and Marechal. Two trends were in evidence: the tracing of metaphysical time and historicity (Horacio Salas, Alejandra Pizarnik, Ramón Plaza) and the examination of urban and social disarray: (Abelardo Castillo, Marta Lynch, Manuel Puig, Alicia Steinberg).

=== Latin American Boom (1960–1970) ===
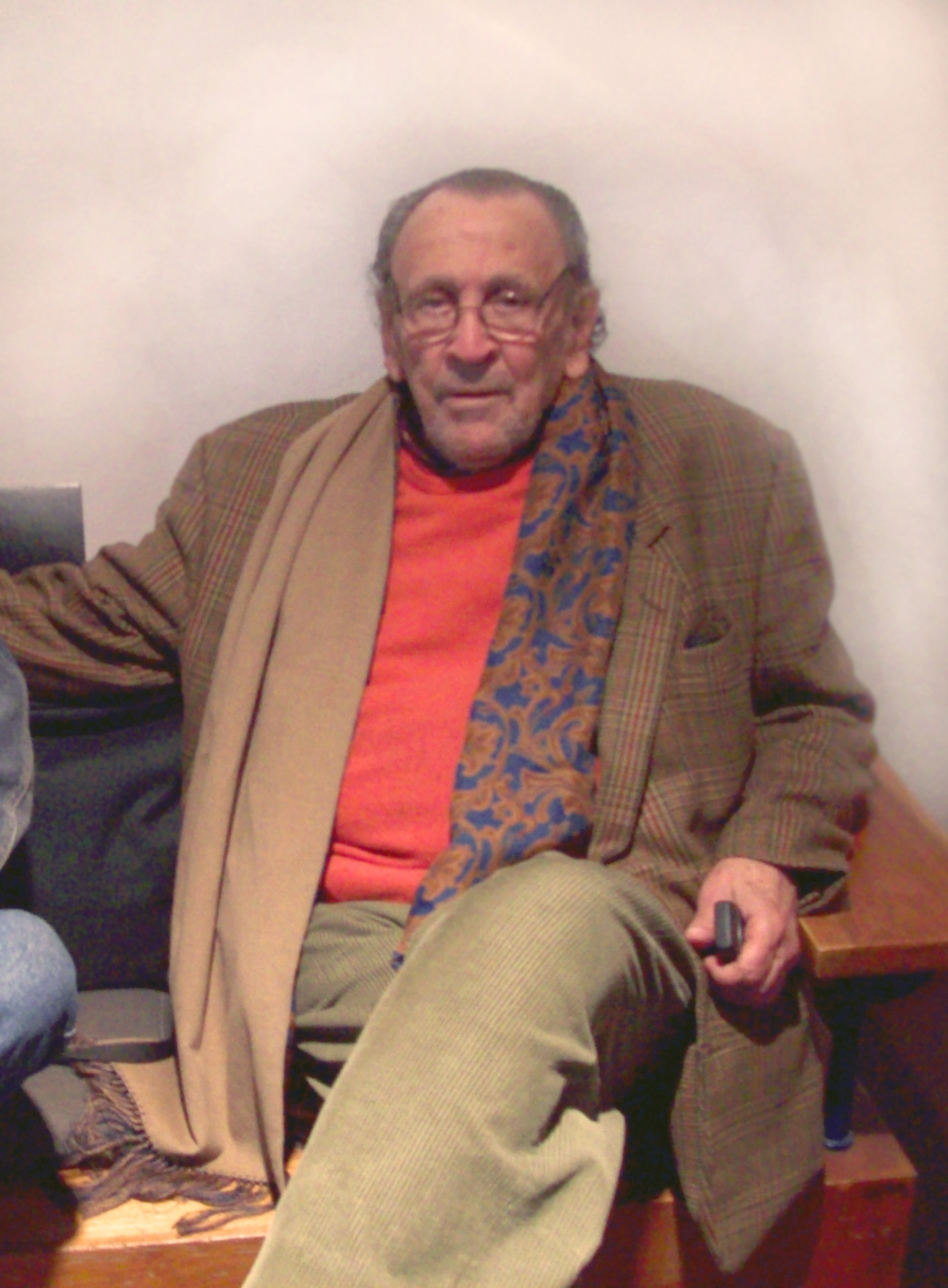
Jorge Álvarez, with Editorial Jorge Álvarez and Ediciones de la Flor, published works such as Los oficios terrestres by Rodolfo Walsh, La señora Ordóñez by Marta Lynch, La traición de Rita Hayworth by Manuel Puig, Los caudillos by Félix Luna, Mi amigo el Che by Jorge Rojo, and Entre sajones y el arrabal by Leopoldo Torre Nilsson, among others.

=== Dirty War ===
The 1970s were a dark period for intellectual creation in Argentina. The epoch is characterised by the exile (Juan Gelman, Antonio Di Benedetto) or death (Roberto Santoro, Haroldo Conti, and Rodolfo Walsh) of major writers. The remaining literary journalists, like Liliana Heker, veiled their opinions in their work. Some journalists (Rodolfo Walsh), poets (Agustín Tavitián and Antonio Aliberti), fiction writers (Osvaldo Soriano, Fernando Sorrentino), and essayists (Ricardo Herrera, María Rosa Lojo) stood out among the vicissitudes and renewed the field of ethical and aesthetic ideas.

=== Current ===
The 1990s are marked by reunion among survivors of different generations, in an intellectual coalition for the review of values and texts relevant to Argentina as the country faced the end of the century. Some examples are Alan Pauls, Guillermo Saccomanno, Mario Areca, Aníbal Cristobo, Ernesto de Sanctis, Marco Denevi, Edgar Brau, etc. In the 21. century some of the more notable authors are writers like Claudia Piñero, Mariana Enriquez, Alberto Laiseca, César Aira and Hernán Casciari.

== Literature by region ==
Literature from the provinces of the interior is as old and prolific as that of Buenos Aires, with the difference that provincial writers, due to their limited access to major publishing houses and mass media, are much less well known than metropolitan writers.

=== Córdoba and central region; Santa Fe ===
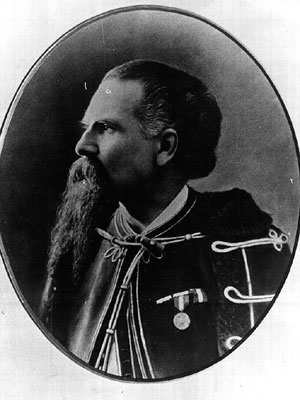
Lucio V. Mansilla in 1865

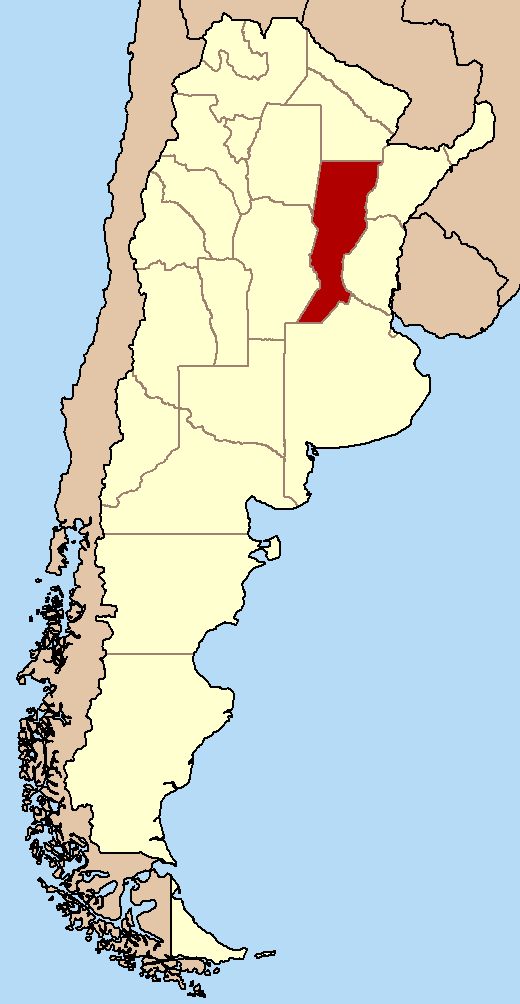
Santa Fe

Literary production in Santa Fe has been highly prolific. The 2019 book Cien años de cine y literatura santafesina offers a detailed survey of local literary culture. Its author, Paulo Ballan, compares this cultural construction to “a torrential river that includes art, beliefs, myths, values and disvalues, clear water and mud,” reflecting a dynamic identity shaped by literary and audiovisual production.

Among the most prominent writers is Juan José Saer, born in Serodino, author of works such as El limonero real (1974), Nadie nada nunca (1980), and Glosa (1986), as well as Angélica Gorodischer, a leading figure in science fiction and fantasy.

In children's literature, notable Santa Fe authors include Alicia Barberis, Marta Coutaz, Analía Giordanino, Ruth Hillar and Cecilia Moscovich.

=== Northwest ===
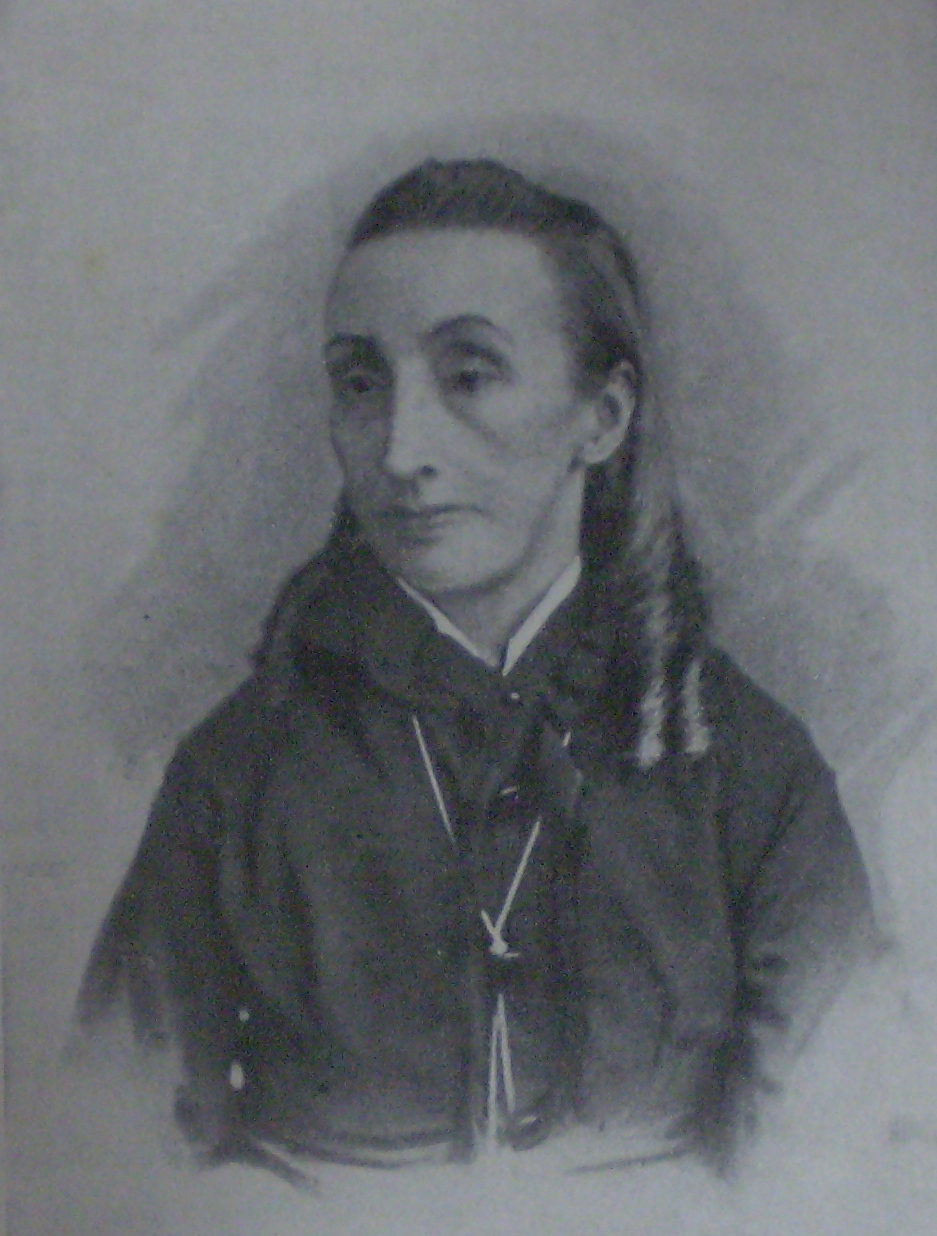
Juana Manuela Gorriti (1818–1896)

Juan Carlos Dávalos and Manuel J. Castilla were prolific poets who described mid-20th-century Salta, although Dávalos also wrote prose. Another notable prose writer from that province is Federico Gauffin. Important figures from Jujuy include Juana Manuela Gorriti and Héctor Tizón, the latter known for depicting indigenous culture.

In Tucumán, prominent figures are Elvira Orphée, short story writer Ramón Alberto Pérez,

=== Cuyo ===
Mendoza produced notable writers such as Juan Draghi Lucero, Antonio Di Benedetto, Armando Tejada Gómez, and Abelardo Arias.

In San Juan, Jorge Leonidas Escudero developed a lyrical style combining regional and universal elements. In San Luis, Antonio Esteban Agüero stands out.

=== Litoral and Chaco ===
Entre Ríos has a long literary tradition across genres, with authors such as Fray Mocho, Martiniano Leguizamón, Mariano E. López, Emma Barrandeguy, Carlos Mastronardi, Juan L. Ortiz, Guillermo Saraví, Gervasio Méndez, and Olegario V. Andrade. In Corrientes, notable figures include Francisco Madariaga, Manuel Florencio Mantilla, and Gerardo Pisarello.

Literature in the Chaco region is more recent, reflecting the relative youth of its provinces. Juan Ramón Lestani and Guido Arnoldo Miranda contributed essays and regional studies. The poet Alfredo Veiravé gained recognition in Chaco, where a poetry prize bears his name. Aledo Meloni became a leading regional poet. Hugo Mitoire has contributed significantly to children's horror literature. Mempo Giardinelli, Gustavo Roldán, and Oscar Hermes Villordo are also notable figures. Sandro Centurión of Formosa has written various short stories, while Mariano Quirós of Chaco has produced detective fiction.

== Literary magazines ==
In Argentina, literary magazines have played a crucial role in the dissemination of new writers, intellectuals, and academics, as well as serving as forums for debate on literary models and political positions.

== See also ==
- Latin American Boom
- Latin American literature
- Latin American poetry
- Cultural movement
