= Martín Fierro (disambiguation) =

Martín Fierro is the national poem of Argentina, and the leading character of that poem.

Martín Fierro may also refer to:

- Martín Fierro (magazine), Argentine literary magazine, 1924–1927
- Martín Fierro, alternate name for Florida group, literary group, linked to the magazine
- Martín Fierro (1904–05 magazine), lesser-known Argentine anarchist magazine
- Martín Fierro (film), 1968 film
- The Return of Martín Fierro, 1974 Argentine film
- Martín Fierro Awards, awards for Argentine radio and television
- Martin Fierro (saxophonist) (1942–2008), American saxophonist
