= Prologue =

Opening to a story that establishes the setting and gives background details

A prologue or prolog (from Ancient Greek πρόλογος prólogos, from πρό pró, "before" and λόγος lógos, "speech") is an opening to a story that establishes the context and gives background details, often some earlier story that ties into the main one, and other miscellaneous information. The Ancient Greek word πρόλογος includes the modern meaning of prologue, but was of wider significance, more like the meaning of preface. The importance, therefore, of the prologue in Greek drama was very great; it sometimes almost took the place of a romance, to which, or to an episode in which, the play itself succeeded.

== Latin ==
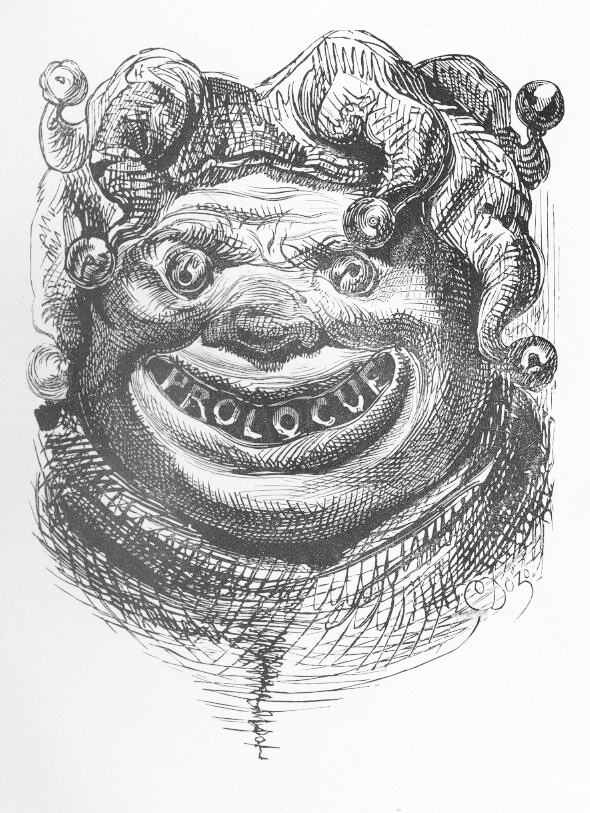
Artwork by Gustave Doré.

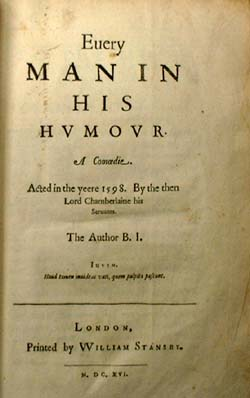
Title page of 1616 printing of Every Man in His Humour, a 1598 play by the English playwright Ben Jonson. The play belongs to the subgenre of the "humours comedy"

On the Latin stage the prologue was often more elaborate than it was in Athens, and in the careful composition of the poems which Plautus prefixes to his plays we see what importance he gave to this portion of the entertainment; sometimes, as in the preface to the Rudens, Plautus rises to the height of his genius in his adroit and romantic prologues, usually placed in the mouths of persons who make no appearance in the play itself.

Molière revived the Plautian prologue in the introduction to his Amphitryon. Racine introduced Piety as the speaker of a prologue which opened his choral tragedy of Esther.

The tradition of the ancients vividly affected our own early dramatists. Not only was the mystery plays and miracles of the Middle Ages begun by a homily, but when the drama in its modern sense was inaugurated in the reign of Elizabeth, the prologue came with it, directly adapted from the practice of Euripides and Terence. Sackville, Lord Buckhurst, prepared a sort of prologue in the dumb show for his Gorboduc of 1562; and he also wrote a famous Induction, which is, practically, a prologue, to a miscellany of short romantic epics by diverse hands.

== Elizabethan ==
Prologues of Renaissance drama often served a specific function of transition and clarification for the audience. A direct address made by one actor, the prologue acted as an appeal to the audience's attention and sympathy, providing historical context, a guide to themes of the play, and occasionally, a disclaimer. In this mode, a prologue, like any scripted performance, would exist as the text, the actor who speaks that text, and the presentation of the language as it is spoken. In ushering the audience from reality into the world of the play, the prologue straddles boundaries between audience, actors, characters, playwrights—basically, it creates a distinction between the imaginary space within the play and the outside world. Ben Jonson has often been noted as using the prologue to remind the audience of the complexities between themselves and all aspects of the performance.

The actor reciting the prologue would appear dressed in black, a stark contrast to the elaborate costumes used during the play. The prologue removed his hat and wore no makeup. He may have carried a book, scroll, or placard displaying the title of the play. He was introduced by three short trumpet calls, on the third of which he entered and took a position downstage. He made three bows in the current fashion of the court, and then addressed the audience. The Elizabethan prologue was unique in incorporating aspects of both classical and medieval traditions. In the classical tradition, the prologue conformed to one of four subgenres: the sustatikos, which recommends either the play or the poet; the epitimetikos, in which a curse is given against a rival, or thanks given to the audience; dramatikos, in which the plot of the play is explained; and mixta, which contains all of these things. In the medieval tradition, expressions of morality and modesty are seen, as well as a meta-theatrical self-consciousness, and an unabashed awareness of the financial contract engaged upon by paid actors and playwrights, and a paying audience.

== Use in fiction ==
Prologues have long been used in non-dramatic fiction, since at least the time of Geoffrey Chaucer's Canterbury Tales, although Chaucer had prologues to many of the tales, rather than one at the front of the book.

The Museum of Eterna's Novel by the Argentine writer Macedonio Fernandez has over 50 prologues by the author. Their style varies between metaphysical, humoristic, psychological, discussions about the art of the novel, etc.

== See also ==
- Epigraph
- Epilogue
- Foreword
- Interlude
- Introduction
- Loa
- Movie prologue
- Preface
- Prolegomena
