= Día de la Tradición =

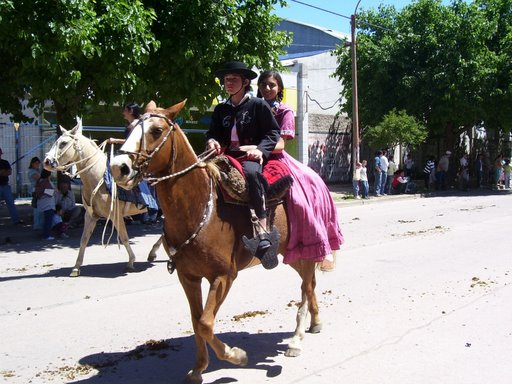
Día de la Tradición festival in La Carlota, province of Córdoba.

Día de la Tradición (English: Tradition Day) is celebrated in Argentina on November 10, the birthday of Argentine poet José Hernández (1834-1886), who wrote, among others, the narrative poem El gaucho Martín Fierro and its continuation, La vuelta de Martín Fierro, stories in verse form of the experience of a gaucho, his lifestyle, customs, language, and codes of honor.

== History ==
Francisco Timpone proposed the idea of the holiday on December 13, 1937, in a meeting of the association named Bases, an institution that paid tribute to Juan Bautista Alberdi and was based in La Plata, provincia de Buenos Aires.

On June 6, 1938, the association presented a note to the Buenos Aires City Legislature requesting that they declare November 10 "Día de la Tradición", for the birth on that date of José Hernández. The note proposed the civic pilgrimage to the Gaucho Ricardo Güiraldes Museum, in San Antonio de Areco, in homage and as an effective consecration of that day.

The approval before the Chamber of Senators and Deputies was unanimous, declared under law No. 4756/39, promulgated on August 18, 1939, and published in the Official Gazette, coming into effect on September 9 of the same year. The aforementioned law originated in the Senate and its authors were D. Edgardo, J. Míguenz, and D. Atilio Roncoroni.

The municipal mayors of La Plata and San Antonio de Areco ran the first celebration. Since 1940, La Plata held the party. La Agrupación published a book every year, summarizing everything that happened.

Law 10220/84 modified Article 3 of Law 4756/39, making it go on to say: The permanent provincial headquarters of tradition is declared to be the town of San Antonio de Areco.

By National Law No. 21154 of 1975, the National Congress extended the validity of November 10 as “Día de la Tradición” to the entire Argentine territory, fulfilling an unfinished aspiration of the Bases group, and declared City of Tradition as the city of San Martín, for being the hometown of José Hernández.
