= Prisma =

Prisma or PRISMA may refer to:

== Media ==
- Prisma, 2019 album by Beret
- Prisma, 2013 album by Motel
- Prisma (magazine), 1930s Catalan magazine
- Prisma (typeface), a typeface designed by Rudolf Koch
- Prisma (app), a photo editing software
- Prisma+, a Greek television channel
- Prisma, character from Sofia the First
- Prisma (East German TV programme), current affairs television program in East Germany
- Prisma (TV series), a 2022 Italian Amazon Prime Video original program

== Organisations ==
- Prisma (chain store), a Finnish hypermarket chain, part of S Group
- Prisma Energy International, an American company
- Prisma Presse, a French publisher, subsidiary of Gruner + Jahr

== Outer space ==
- Prisma (satellite project), a Swedish satellite project.
- PRISMA (spacecraft), an Italian space project
- 1192 Prisma, a minor planet

== Other uses ==
- Chevrolet Prisma (disambiguation), two models of sedan car
- Preferred Reporting Items for Systematic Reviews and Meta-Analyses, standard for the reporting of systematic reviews and meta-analyses of research
- Prisma, a Russian spy software program pioneered by Vyacheslav Volodin

== See also ==
- Prism (disambiguation), which translates as "prisma" in several languages, including Swedish, Greek, German, Italian, Dutch, Spanish and Portuguese
- Prizma, a color motion picture process
- HK Prizma Riga, a Latvian ice hockey team
