= Martín Fierro (1904–05 magazine) =

Martín Fierro was an Argentine magazine published between 1904 and 1905, founded to propagate anarchist ideas. It was named after José Hernández's epic poem Martín Fierro, a touchstone of Argentine national identity, whose title character is a renegade gaucho.

The magazine was directed and published by Alberto Ghiraldo in Buenos Aires, from 3 March 1904 to 6 February 1905; from October 1904 until it ceased publication, it appeared as a weekly supplement to the daily paper La Protesta. In total, there were 48 issues, ranging between 12 and 16 pages; the format was 270 x 190 mm. It was initially printed on the presses of El Correo Español and, later, those of La Protesta.

== History ==
The magazine began operations from an editorial office near the Avenida de Mayo, but eventually moved to Ghiraldo's own home; it was ultimately closed by a police raid.

The magazine appeared in a context in which the number of readers in Buenos Aires was increasing, as a result of growing immigration, urbanization, access to formal education, and a growing commercial press. Martin Fierro was directed to the popular sectors of this growing market. It advocated an anarchist ideology and was conceived as part of the movement among Argentine workers against the Law of Residency directed against foreign trade union leaders and activists.

Anarchist ideology, traditionally characterized by the bourgeois press as the work of "foreign agitators", was presented by Martin Fierro as rooted in the gaucho life and identity, by means of stories, poems, illustrations, and sociological notes and articles. It also strongly emphasized a feminist protest against the various ways in which women were oppressed.

Ghiraldo's connections to a broad cast of intellectuals such as Roberto Payró, Carlos de Saussens, Manuel Ugarte, José Ingenieros, Ricardo Jaimes Freyre, Carlos Baires, Juan Mas y Pi, Eduardo Schiaffino, Evaristo Carriego, Alfredo Palacios and Rubén Darío, all of whom published in the magazine, broadened the readership of Martin Fierro beyond the anarchist camp.

Beginning with issue 32, of October 1904, the magazine became a weekly supplement to the daily paper La Protesta, an anarchist publication also directed by Ghiraldo. From that point, it ceased to contain the important illustrations and political caricatures that denounced the outrages of the clergy and the owners of businesses against the popular sectors.

As a consequence of the repression unleashed in the wake of the Radical Revolution of 1905, on February 6 La Protesta was raided and obliged to close temporarily. The magazine did not reappear, and months later, when the newspaper resumed publication, Ghiraldo suffered internal pressures that caused him to abandon his role, although not his anarchist militancy, which would again be expressed in the magazine Ideas y Figuras.

There were two later Argentine magazines with the same name, one briefly in 1919–1920 and a second from 1924 to 1927, both under the direction of Evar Méndez; they bore no relation to the 1904–1905 Martín Fierro except for common inspiration from Hernández's poem.
