= Eduardo González Lanuza =

Argentine poet (1900–1984)

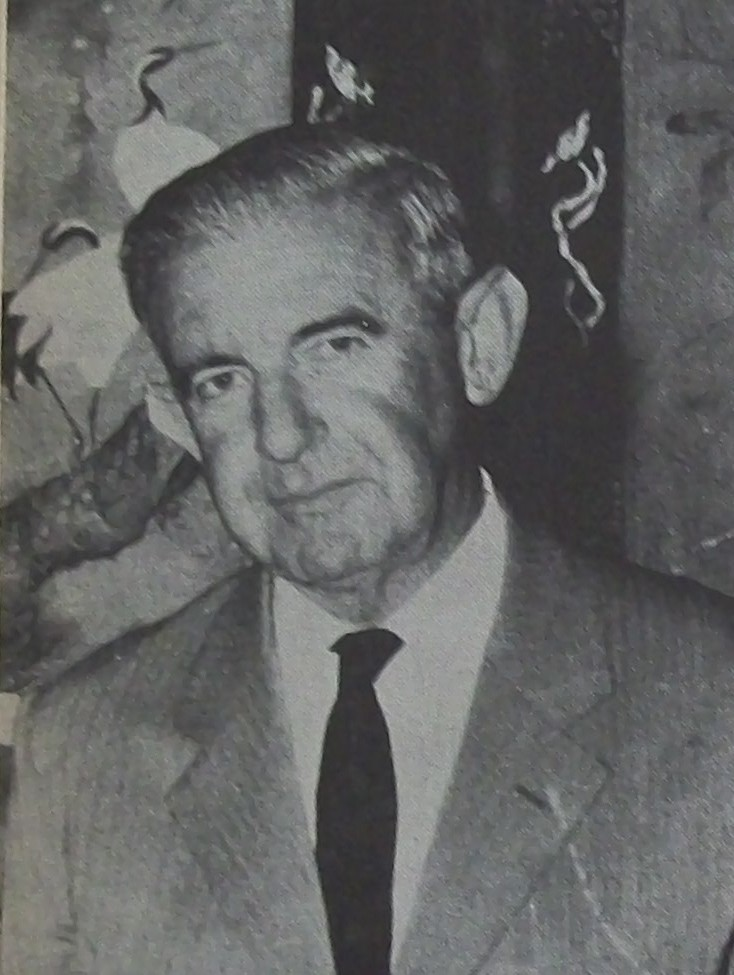
Eduardo González Lanuza

Eduardo González Lanuza (July 11, 1900 - July 17, 1984) was an Argentine poet born in Santander, Spain. One of his best known work is "Poem for Being Recorded in a Phonograph Disc" (1932). He also was part of the Ultraist movement and one of the founders of Prisma and Proa magazines as well as contributor in Martín Fierro magazine.

== Selected works ==
- Prisms (1924) (poetry)
- Coven (1927) (short stories)
- While the Clock Strikes Six O'Clock (1931) co-written with Armando Villar (theatre)
- Thirtysome Poems (1932) (poetry)
- Mr. Pulcinella's Walking Stick (1935) (theatre)
- The Cutthroating of the Innocent (1938) (poetry)
- Not Even the Flood (1939) (theatre)
- Handful of Songs (1940) (poetry)
- Passable Glass (1943) (poetry)
- Ode to Joy and Other Poems (1949) (poetry)
- Christmas and Passion Altarpieces (1953) (poetry)
- Sum and Go On (1960) (poetry)
- Christmas Mystery (1966) (theatre)
- Profession of Faith (1970) (poetry)
- Hai-Kais (1977) (poetry)
- The Pimpirigallo and Other Little Birds (1980) (poetry)
- Tunes for Songs (1981)
