= Cristina Mucci =

Argentine writer, lawyer and journalist

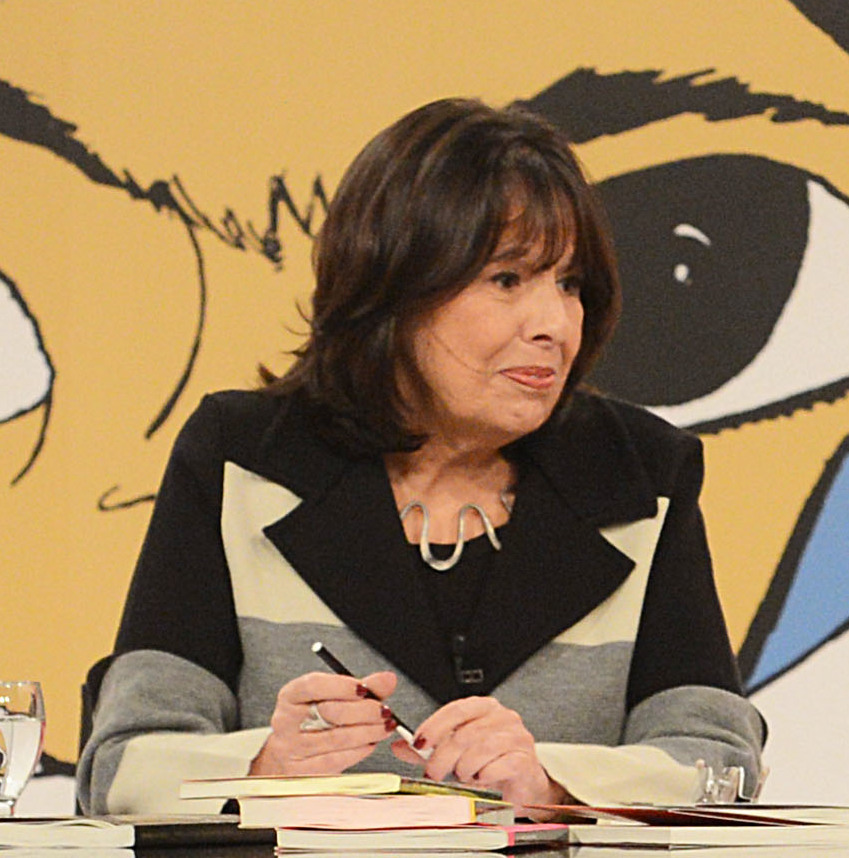
- Born: 24 January 1949 (age 77); Buenos Aires, Argentina
- Education: Pontifical Catholic University of Argentina
- Occupations: Writer, journalist
- Awards: Martín Fierro Awards (1995, 1996, 1998, 2002); Konex Award (2007)
- Website: www.cristinamucci.com.ar

Cristina Mucci (born 24 January 1949) is an Argentine writer and journalist. Since 1987 she has been directing and producing the television program Los siete locos, dedicated to the dissemination of books and culture. She is the author of books about Argentine writers, such as Leopoldo Lugones and three emblematic women of Argentine literature from the 1950s–60s: Marta Lynch, Silvina Bullrich, and Beatriz Guido.

== Career ==
Cristina Mucci earned a law degree from the Pontifical Catholic University of Argentina. She worked as a cultural journalist at the newspapers La Voz and La Razón where she was editor of the cultural page, as well as publishing articles in magazines and newspapers such as Clarín and La Nación.

Since 1987, she has been directing the television program Los siete locos, dedicated to the dissemination of books and culture, for which she won four Martín Fierro Awards. She hosted the program Encuentros directed by Oscar Barney Finn, wrote scripts for the programs about Victoria Ocampo and Silvina Ocampo for the DNI cycle and the special about the 20th anniversary of the Julio Cortázar's death.

== Awards and distinctions ==
- Martín Fierro Awards (1995, 1996, 1998, 2002)
- APTRA Special Career Award
- 1998 Julio Cortázar Award from the Argentine Book Chamber
- Los siete locos declared of cultural interest by the Secretary of Culture and the Chamber of Deputies
- 2007 Konex Award for Literature
- 2010 Bicentennial Medal from the City of Buenos Aires

== Publications ==
- Voces de la cultura argentina, El Ateneo, 1997, ISBN 9789500284721
- La señora Lynch, biography of the writer Marta Lynch, Grupo Editorial Norma, 2000, ISBN 9789879334843
- Divina Beatrice, biography of the writer Beatriz Guido, 2002, ISBN 978-9875450707
- La gran burguesa, biography of the writer Silvina Bullrich, Grupo Editorial Norma, 2003, ISBN 9789875451285
- Pensar la Argentina, Grupo Editorial Norma, 2006, ISBN 9789875453791
- Leopoldo Lugones, los escritores y el poder, Ediciones B, 2009, ISBN 9789876271233
