= Marta Lynch =

Argentine writer (1925–1985)

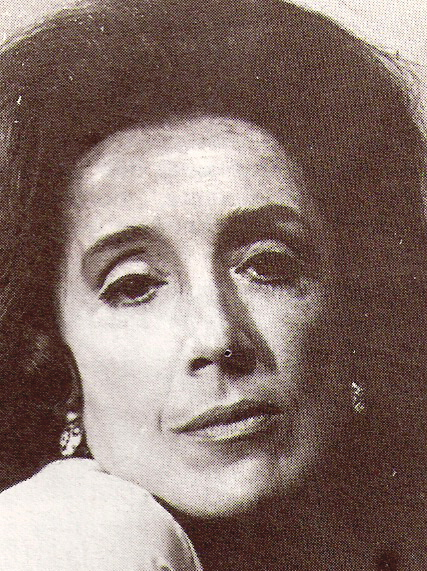
- Marta Lynch
- Born: Marta Lía Frigerio; 8 March 1925 Buenos Aires, Argentina
- Died: 8 October 1985 (aged 60) Buenos Aires, Argentina
- Occupation: Writer
- Language: Spanish

Marta Lynch was the pseudonym of Marta Lía Frigerio (Buenos Aires, 8 March 1925 – 8 October 1985), an Argentine writer. She wrote seven novels and nine collections of short prose.

== Life ==
Born in Buenos Aires, she studied philology at the University of Buenos Aires. She married a lawyer, Juan Manuel Lynch, with whom she had two children. She belonged to a group of female Argentine writers in the 1950s and 1960s (like Silvina Bullrich, Beatriz Guido, Sara Gallardo, etc.). They wrote various best-sellers and were both popular and controversial during that time. Alberto Girri described Lynch as a writer "little less than unique among us, for her impetus and narrative dexterity and incorporating to our literature characters like Mrs. Ordóñez or Colorado Villanueva, perhaps archetypes of our means."

She graduated with a degree in literature from the Faculty of Philosophy and Letters of Buenos Aires. She gave lectures in Europe and throughout the Americas (Mexico, Cuba, Paraguay, Chile, Uruguay) and collaborated with La Nación. She was proclaimed one of the ten best South American storytellers.

== Political activity ==
In November 1972, Lynch travelled in the charter that brought back Juan Perón. Her political stances changed throughout her lifetime.

== Death ==
She was terrified of the effects of ageing both on the body and in the mind. In 1985, after a long battle with depression, she died by suicide in Buenos Aires.

She is survived by her children, the anthropologist Manuel Ramiro, the philosopher Enrique and Marta Juana Lynch. And her grandchildren, including Deborah Francisca and Maria Josefina Lynch; Maria and Juan Manuel Lynch; Maria Carelli and Juan and Catalina Poitevin, respectively.

== Works ==
- La alfombra roja (Fabril Editora, 1962) Novela
- Al vencedor (Editorial Losada, 1965) Novela
- Los cuentos tristes (Centro Editor de América Latina, 1967) Cuentos
- La señora Ordóñez (Editorial Jorge Álvarez, 1968) Novela
- Cuentos de colores (Editorial Sudamericana, 1970) – Premio Municipal – Cuentos
- El cruce del río (Editorial Sudamericana, 1972) Novela
- Un árbol lleno de manzanas (Editorial Sudamericana, 1974) Novela
- Los dedos de la mano (Editorial Sudamericana, 1976) Cuentos
- La penúltima versión de la Colorada Villanueva (Editorial Sudamericana, 1978) Novela
- Los años de fuego (Editorial Sudamericana, 1980) Cuentos
- Informe bajo llave (Editorial Sudamericana, 1983) Novela
- No te duermas, no me dejes (Editorial Sudamericana, 1985) Cuentos

== Bibliography ==
- Cristina Mucci, La señora Lynch biografía de una escritora controvertida. Buenos Aires: Norma, 2000.
- "Historia de la Literatura Argentina Vol I"Centro Editor de América Latina. 1968 Buenos Aires, Argentina
- Riccio, Alessandra. "Eros y poder en Informe bajo llave de Marta Lynch". Escritura: Revista de teoría y Crítica literaria 16:31-32 (1991): 223–29.
- Rocco Cuzzi, Renata. "Homenaje a las tres pioneras del best-seller Femenino". Clarín 20 Abr. 2004
- Uriarte, Claudio. El Almirante Cero: biografía no autorizada de Emilio Eduardo Massera. Buenos Aires: Planeta, 1991.

== Works translated into English ==
- La alfombra roja (The Red Rug), 1962
- Al vencedor (To the Victor), 1965
- La señora Ordonez (Mrs Ordonez), 1967
- El cruce del río (River Crossing), 1972
- Un arbol lleno de manzanas (A Tree Filled with Apples), 1974
- La penúltima Versión de la Colorado Villanueva (The Penultimate Version of Red Villanueva), 1978
- Informe bajo llave (Report under Lock and Key), 1983

== See also ==
- Lists of writers
