= Vicente Barbieri =

Argentine poet (1903–1956)

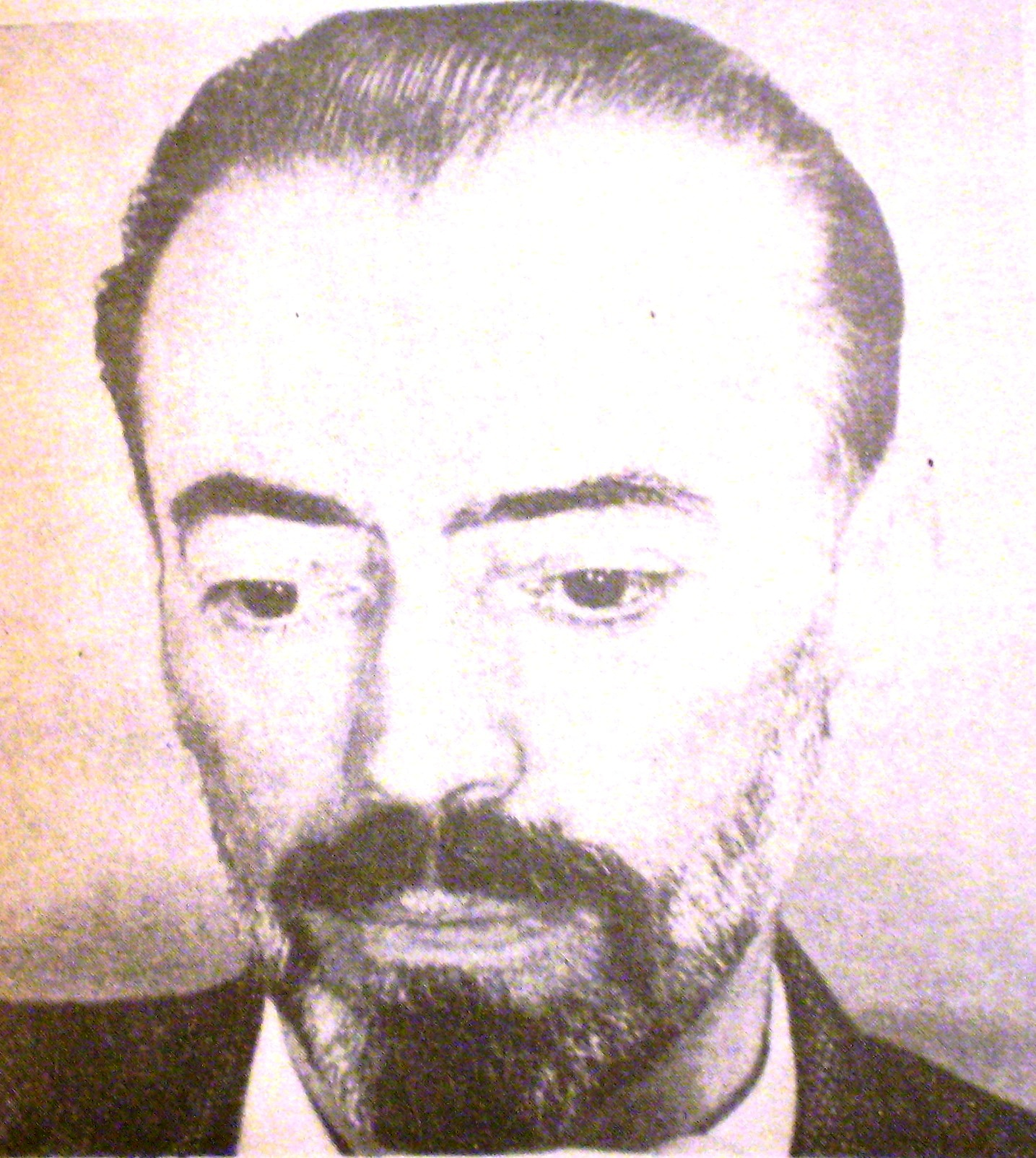
Barbieri in 1948

Vicente Barbieri (August 31, 1903 – September 10, 1956) was an Argentine poet born in Alberti. He was part of the Argentine Generation of '40, and is known for several poem collections like El bailarín (1953), and many others. In the years 1955 and 1956 he was director of El Hogar magazine and president of the Sociedad Argentina de Escritores (SADE). He died at the age of 53 from tuberculosis and was awarded posthumously with the National Prize of Poetry.

== Works ==
- Fábula del corazón (1939) (poetry)
- Nacarid Mary Glynor (1939) (poetry)
- Árbol total (1940) (poetry)
- El bosque persuasivo (1941) (poetry)
- Corazón del Oeste (1941) (poetry)
- La columna y el viento (1942) (poetry)
- Número impar (1943) (poetry)
- El río distante (Relatos de una infancia) (1945) (prose)
- Cabeza yacente (1945) (poetry)
- Cuerpo Austral (1945) (poetry)
- Anillo de sal (1946) (poetry)
- Desenlace de Endimión (1951) (prose)
- El bailarín (1953) (poetry)
- Facundo en la ciudadela (1956) (theatre)
- El intruso (1958) (prose)
- Obra poética (1961) (collected poems published posthumously, with prologue by Carlos Mastronardi and epilogue by Juan Carlos Ghiano)
- Prosas dispersas (1970) (previously unpublished texts)
