= Martín Fierro (magazine) =

Argentine literary magazine (1924–1927

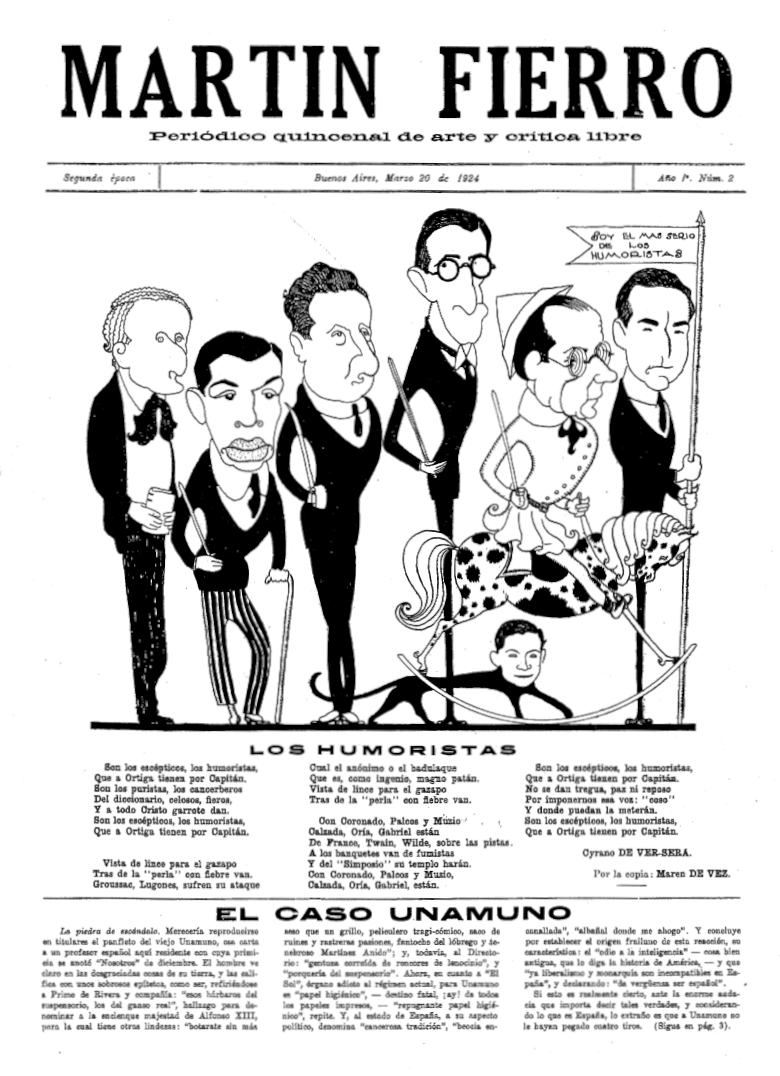
Title page of the March 1924 issue.

Martín Fierro was an Argentine literary magazine which appeared from February 1924 to 1927. It was one of the leading avant-garde magazines in the country.

== History and profile ==
The magazine was founded by Evar Méndez (its director), José B. Cairola, Leónidas Campbell, H. Carambat, Luis L. Franco, Oliverio Girondo, Ernesto Palacio, Pablo Rojas Paz, and Gastón O. Talamón, and reached a circulation of 20,000. Its headquarters was in Buenos Aires.

Several major writers, such as Jorge Luis Borges, contributed poems and short articles. Further "sympathizers" were Pedro Figari, Raúl González Tuñón, Eduardo González Lanuza, Leopoldo Marechal, Xul Solar, among others, as listed in # "12 and 13". It also published texts by Mario Bravo, Fernando Fader, Macedonio Fernández, Santiago Ganduglia, Samuel Glusberg, Norah Lange, Leopoldo Lugones, Roberto Mariani, Ricardo Molinari, Conrado Nalé Roxlo, Nicolás Olivari, Horacio A. Rega Molina and Ricardo Rojas. Illustrator Lino Palacio was one of several contributors to the graphic design of the magazine.

Martín Fierro inherited its name from a previous short-lived magazine (1919), also directed by Méndez, more committed to social and political issues, and from an anarchist magazine in which Macedonio Fernández had published poems in 1904. The magazine was named after Martín Fierro, the gaucho outlaw whose story constitutes Argentina's national poem, written by José Hernández. The 1924–1927 incarnation took a different, more "art-for-art's sake" approach. It was often linked to the Florida group, sometimes called Martín Fierro group even though some Boedo group writers also contributed to its pages. One of them, Roberto Mariani, started within Martín Fierro a debate on political engagement. Arturo Cancela suggested in a letter to Martín Fierro that both sides merge under the common name of "Schools of Floredo street", and to name Manuel Gálvez as president, as he lived in Pueyrredón street, equidistant from both groups.

Martín Fierro showcased Ramón Gómez de la Serna's work and Emilio Pettoruti and Arthur Honegger's avant garde art, attacked writer Leopoldo Lugones as an icon of the past, and also attacked the attempt of Spanish magazine La Gaceta Literaria of "setting in Madrid the intellectual meridian of Hispanoamerica," that is, claiming Spanish hegemony over Latin American intellectual culture.

One of Martín Fierro's distinguishing features was its fake obituaries, making fun of everybody, both Boedo and Florida writers, and Leopoldo Lugones himself.

The end of the publication was apparently decided by Méndez to avoid putting the magazine at the service of Hipólito Yrigoyen's campaign for a second term as president of Argentina, as some of its collaborators demanded.

== Sources ==
- El periódico Martín Fierro, Ed. Galerna, Buenos Aires, 1968. With an introduction by Adolfo Prieto, ed.
