= The Museum of Eterna's Novel =

The Museum of Eterna's Novel (original Spanish-language title: Museo de la Novela de la Eterna) is an avant-garde experimental novel by the Argentine writer Macedonio Fernández. The book has been described as Fernández' masterwork.

Fernández started writing it in 1925, and continued working on it for the rest of his life. It was published posthumously in 1967, 15 years after his death.

Fernández is widely regarded as a major influence on Jorge Luis Borges, and its writing style bears some resemblance to Borges'. It has been described as an "anti-novel". The book is written in a non-linear style, as a set of multi-layered diversions, discursions and self-reflections, with over fifty prologues before the "main" text of the novel begins.

== See also ==
- Ultraist movement
