= Juan Laurentino Ortiz =

Argentine poet

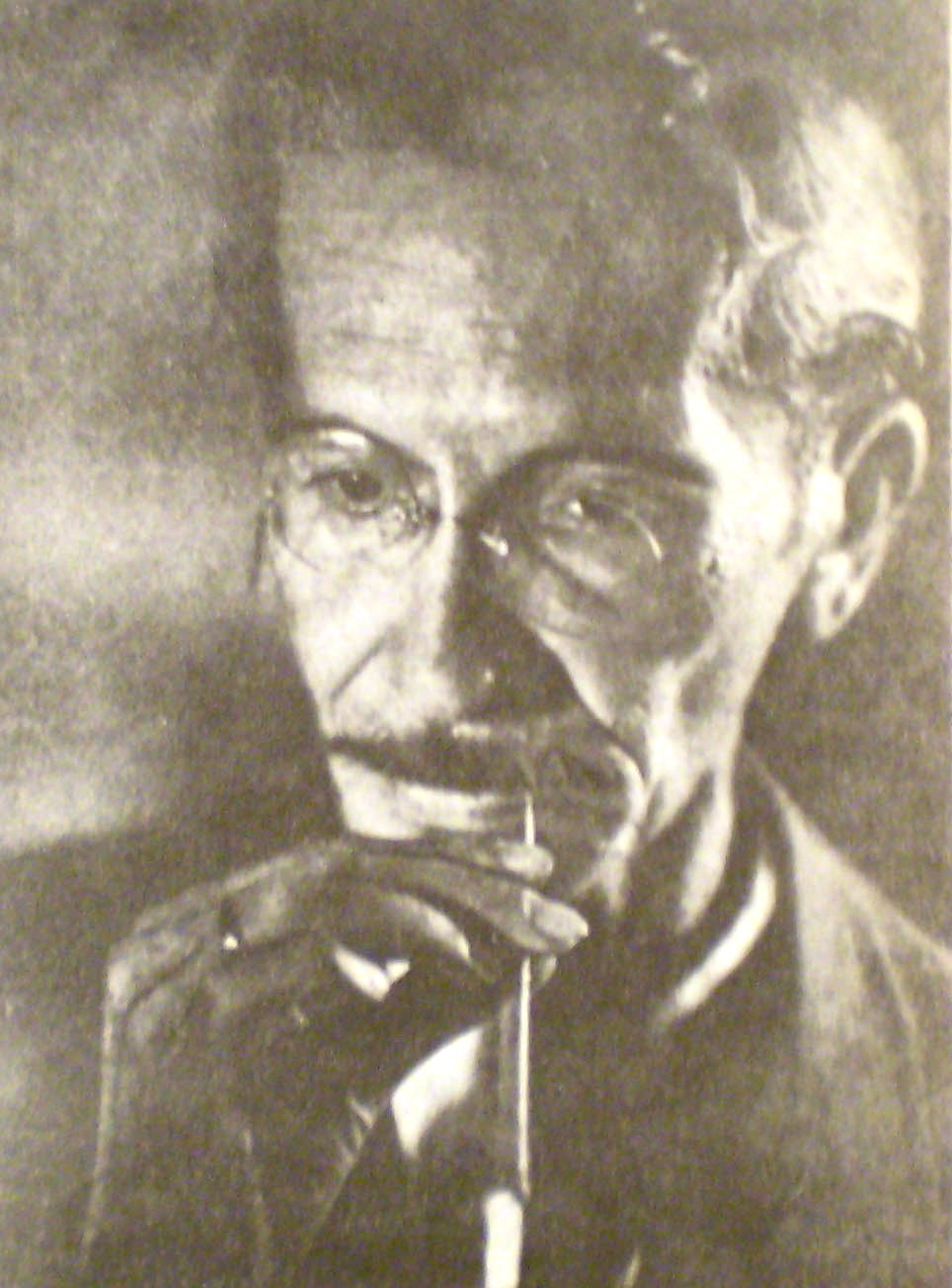

Juan Laurentino Ortiz (June 11, 1896 – September 2, 1978) was an Argentine poet, born in the town of Puerto Ruiz, Entre Ríos Province. He died in Paraná, capital of the same province, at the age of 82.

He spent his childhood in the wilds of Montiel, a landscape that forever marked his poetry.

He studied philosophy and lived for a short time in Buenos Aires, but soon returned to his province. Although he joined some political movements, he lived mostly isolated from the cultural climate of Argentina's capital and only traveled abroad once at the invitation of the communist government of China.

His extensive work identified the mind with the landscape that surrounded him throughout his life in a "splendid monotony". The image of his tall and thin figure in concentrated observation of the river scenery transcended his work and became a literary legend. 'Juanele', as he began to be called in the literary circles of the Argentinian capital, published his poems of long verses in lowercase typography, taking painstaking care of every aspect of the manuscript. As a result, these characteristics tended to be respected by his publishers in the published version of his poems.

The symbolism of French and Oriental poetry influenced his work, which was characterized by delicacy and a contemplative disposition which often referred to rivers, trees, floods, and the changes of the seasons without skirting the social history of his home province. At the same time, his poems exhibit a special sensitivity to the "drama of poverty" and, in particular, the suffering of innocent children. One of his well-known poems, "The Gualeguay", is a narrative of both the landscape and historical and economic events that occurred on the banks of one of the rivers in the province.

== Works ==
- "El agua y la noche" (1924–1932)
- "El alba sube..."(1933–1936)
- "El ángel inclinado" (1938)
- "La rama hacia el este" (1940)
- "El álamo y el viento" (1947)
- "El aire conmovido" (1949)
- "La mano infinita" (1951)
- "La brisa profunda" (1954)
- "El alma y las colinas" (1956)
- "De las raíces y del cielo" (1958)
- "En el aura del sauce" (Complete works 1970-1971, including "El junco y la corriente", "El Gualeguay" and "La orilla que se abisma", which were previously unpublished)
