= Roberto Jorge Santoro =

Argentine poet, publisher and political activist

Roberto Jorge Santoro (April 17, 1939 Buenos Aires– disappeared 1977 Buenos Aires) was an Argentine poet, publisher and political activist. Santoro created a literary journal and was active with other journals.

== Biography ==
Roberto Jorge Santoro was born on April 17, 1939, in Buenos Aires; his parents were workers. During his lifetime, Santoro worked as a painter, street vendor, stallholder in a market, typographer and teacher in an industrial school.

Santoro founded and directed El Barrilete, a literary magazine featuring tango poets Carlos de la Púa, Celedonio Flores, Homero Manzi, Martín Campos, Carlos Patiño, Alberto Costa and Rafael Vásquez. He also collaborated with La Cosa, Gente de Buenos Aires, Papeles de Buenos Aires, La Pluma and La Palabra.

In Literatura de la pelota, Santoro reproduces poems and writings by Argentine intellectuals about their passion for football. This was his attempt to reconcile high culture with popular culture.

Originally a Guevarist, Santoro joined the Workers' Revolutionary Party (PRT) in the 1960s. In his later poems, Santoro condemned a coercive political system, its moral hypocrisy, and its decadent institutions. He did so with a sense of humor and a sense of the grotesque. His style was effective and forceful.

On June 1, 1977, Santoro was taken from the National School of Technical Education No. 25, where he served as deputy principal. He was never seen again. It is believed that government agents kidnapped and murdered Santoro in response to his political activism.

== Works ==
- Oficio desesperado (Ediciones Cuadernos del Alfarero, 1962)
- De tango y lo demás (Editorial Barrilete, fragmento 1962, versión completa 1964)
- El último tranvía (Editorial Barrilete, 1963)
- Nacimiento en la tierra (Ediciones Cuadernos Australes, 1963)
- Pedradas con mi patria (Editorial Barrilete, 1964)
- En pocas palabras (Ediciones Hechas a mano, 1967)
- Literatura de la pelota (Editorial Papeles de Buenos Aires, 1971; ediciones Lea, 2007)
- A ras del suelo (Editorial Papeles de Buenos Aires, 1971)
- Desafío (Editorial Gente de Buenos Aires, 1972)
- Uno más uno humanidad (Ediciones Dead Weight, 1972)
- En esta tierra lo que mata es la humedad (tragedia musical representada en Buenos Aires, 1972)
- En esta tierra (canciones; música de Raúl Parentella; canto Kiko Fernández; Music Hall, 1972, disco L.P.)
- Poesía en general (Editorial Papeles de Buenos Aires, 1973)
- Cuatro canciones y un vuelo (Editorial Gente de Buenos Aires, 1973)
- Las cosas claras (anti-libros "La trenza loca", 1973)
- Lo que no veo no lo creo (canciones; música y canto Jorge Cutello, 1974)
- No negociable, carpeta (Editorial Papeles de Buenos Aires, 1975)

== Notes ==
Some English translations appear in Big Hammer, edited by Dave Roskos. Publisher: CreateSpace Independent Publishing Platform; 19th edition (February 7, 2017). ISBN 978-1542995405
