= Macedonio Fernández =

Argentine writer, humorist and philosopher

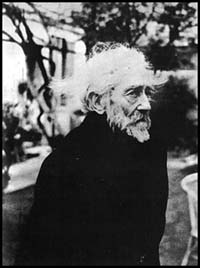
Macedonio Fernández

Macedonio Fernández (1 June 1874 – 10 February 1952) was an Argentine writer, humorist and philosopher. His writings included novels, stories, poetry, journalism, and works not easily classified. He was a mentor to Jorge Luis Borges and other avant-garde Argentine writers. Seventeen years of his correspondence with Borges was published in 2000. His published poetry includes "Creía yo" ("I believed").

== Life ==
Macedonio (like Uruguay's Felisberto Hernández, he is commonly referred to by his first name only) was the son of Macedonio Fernández, farmer and military officer, and Rosa del Mazo Aguilar Ramos. In 1887, he enrolled in the Argentine Colegio Nacional Central. It is believed that he is a descendant of the Macedonio family of Naples, Italy who claimed descent from the Macedonian dynasty of Eastern Rome and Philip II of ancient Macedonia.

In 1891–1892, as a university student, he published in El Progreso, a series of critical essays on customs and manners later included in Papeles antiguos. Like his intimate friend Jorge Guillermo Borges (father of Jorge Luis Borges), he was interested in psychology and in the philosopher Arthur Schopenhauer.

In 1897 he was granted a degree as a doctor of jurisprudence by the law faculty of the University of Buenos Aires. In this period, he wrote for La Montaña, a socialist daily directed by Leopoldo Lugones and José Ingenieros. He was a personal friend of physician, journalist, politician, and writer Juan B. Justo, with whom he maintained a correspondence. In 1898, he was admitted to the bar, and in 1899 he married Elena de Obieta, with whom he had four children (Macedonio, Adolfo, Maite, plus one)

In 1904 he published some poems in a magazine called Martín Fierro (not the more famous magazine of the same name published two decades later). In 1910, he obtained the position of public prosecutor in the Juzgado Letrado de Posadas, which he held for several years.

His wife died in 1920, and their children were left in the care of grandparents and aunts. Macedonio abandoned the profession of a lawyer. On the return of the Borges family from Europe in 1921, he renewed his friendship with his old friend, and also began a friendship with Jorge Luis Borges, at this time a young ultraist poet.

In 1928 he published No toda es vigilia la de los ojos abiertos, at the request of Raúl Scalabrini Ortiz and Leopoldo Marechal; the next year he published Papeles de Recienvenido.

En 1938 he published "Novela de la Eterna" y la Niña del dolor, la "Dulce-persona" de un amor que no fue sabido, an anticipation of Museo de la Novela de la Eterna (published posthumously in 1967); in 1941 he published, in Chile Una novela que comienza, and in 1944 a new edition of Papeles de Recienvenido.

In 1947, Macedonio moved into the home of his son Adolfo de Obieta, where he lived for the rest of his life.

== Macedonio and Borges ==
Macedonio was Jorge Luis Borges's most important Argentine mentor and influence. The relationship between the writers, however, was far more complex than Borges or his contemporaries represented it to be. In his later years, Borges made a point of naming Macedonio as an early influence whom, in the exuberance of his youth, Borges imitated "to the point of plagiarism." At the same time, Borges denied that Macedonio possessed any literary talent or importance, reinforcing the long-held perception of the older man as a kind of local Socratic philosopher, specific to Argentina and constitutive of an Argentine mythic dimension.

Recent studies by Ana Camblong, Julio Prieto, Daniel Attala and Todd S. Garth, among others, indicate that Macedonio's literary impact on Borges was far more profound and enduring than Borges ever admitted, and that Borges went to great pains to hide this influence. Many of the most fundamental concepts underpinning Borges' fiction come directly from Macedonio. These include the questioning of space and time and their continuity; the confusion of dreaming and wakefulness; the unreliability of memory and the importance of forgetfulness; the slipperiness (or nonexistence) of personal identity; the denial of originality and the emphasis on texts as being recyclings and translations of prior texts; and the questioning and commingling of the roles of author, reader, editor and commentator.

These influences extend to thematic material. Such themes include the conceit of an alternative, fictional dimension, elaborated anonymously in collaboration, that invades the known, tangible world (Borges' "Tlön, Uqbar, Orbis Tertius" and Macedonio's campaign to transform Buenos Aires by turning it into a novel, a component of his Museo de la Novela de la Eterna); and the hermetic world of immigrant working girls who must negotiate the city on their own, secret terms based purely on instinct and passion (Borges' "Emma Zunz" and Macedonio's Adriana Buenos Aires). While it is evident both men were inspired by ideas they read in the works of late-nineteenth and early-twentieth century philosophers (specifically Schopenhauer and Bergson), there is little question that the two Argentines developed some of their most characteristic and enduring ideas together, in conversation, throughout the 1920s. Macedonio appears explicitly in Borges' "Dialogue about a Dialogue," in which the two discuss the immortality of the soul.

The relationship between these two men began in earnest in 1921, when Borges returned to Buenos Aires with his family after their extended stay in Switzerland (and travels elsewhere in Europe), where he had completed his education. Borges' father, Jorge Guillermo Borges Haslam, had been a close companion to Macedonio and attended law school with him. Upon graduating law school, Macedonio, the elder Borges, and companion Julio Molina y Vedia hatched a plan to found a utopian colony based on the anarchist principles of Élisée Reclus. This plan apparently never went beyond an exploratory visit the three made around 1897 to a plantation the Molina y Vedia family owned in the Argentine Chaco, near the Bolivian border. During the years prior to 1921, Macedonio married, started a law practice and went about raising a family. This idyll came to an end when Macedonio's wife, Elena de Obieta, died suddenly in 1920. Macedonio then shuttered his law practice, dismantled his household and, about the same time as he renewed his friendship with the now adult Jorge Luis Borges, embarked on a life as an idiosyncratic writer-philosopher.

Borges and other members of the generación martinfierrista were drawn to Macedonio as a mentor and figurehead who could serve as an anchor to the nascent Buenos Aires avant-garde and a foil to Leopoldo Lugones, leader of the modernista movement of a generation earlier. Macedonio made noteworthy, if infrequent, contributions to the literary gatherings of the ultraísta movement and the related "Florida" group of writers and artists. Borges was an active participant in Macedonio's intimate tertulias, both in Buenos Aires bars and cafés and in a shack Macedonio sometimes borrowed on a friend's ranch outside the city. He also was one of the collaborators in Macedonio's burlesque campaigns for the presidency of the Argentine Republic (in 1921 and again in 1927), episodes which apparently gave rise to the analogous fictional campaign in Museo. In addition, Borges was responsible for urging Macedonio to publish at least one of the two book-length works printed in Macedonio's lifetime, No toda es vigilia la de los ojos abiertos, in 1926.

The relationship between Borges and Macedonio appears to have begun to deteriorate around 1927 or 1928, when correspondence (published and analyzed by Carlos García) indicates a rift between them. This is also about the time that Borges made his famous break with the avant-garde and pronounced the death of Argentine ultraísmo, essentially forcing the closure of its most important publication, the little magazine Martín Fierro, after its sixteenth issue. The two events may not be coincidental. From 1927 onward, Borges not only started to write, publish and promote his characteristic short fiction (beginning with "Hombre de la esquina rosada"), he aggressively renounced his prior aesthetic production and put considerable energy into burying it forever. A number of sources (Donald Shaw in particular) suggest that Borges began to regard most of his early writings, and the ideas behind them, as potentially pernicious, especially in the hands of nationalists. Supporting this notion is the fact that many of Borges's stories in which Macedonio's influence is most evident imply a warning against concepts and principles Macedonio represented: absolute relativism; the priority of thought, emotion and imagination over a nominal existence; and the implicit heroism of a hermetic existence.

== Works ==
- No toda es vigilia la de los ojos abiertos; arreglo de papeles que dejó un personaje de novela creado por el arte, Deunamor el no existente caballero, el estudioso de su esperanza (1928)
- Una novela que comienza (1941)
- Poemas, with a prologue by Natalicio González. México, Guarania, 1953.
- Papeles de Recienvenido. Continuación de la nada (1944); Papeles de recienvenido y continuación de la nada (1989)
- Museo de la novela de la eterna (1967); (1995) ISBN 84-376-1379-5; (1982) ISBN 84-660-0090-9; ISBN 84-660-0089-5 (pbk.)
- No toda es vigilia la de los ojos abiertos y otros escritos. Advertencia de Adolfo de Obieta. Buenos Aires, CEAL, 1967.
- Cuadernos de todo y nada. Buenos Aires, Corregidor, 1972. 2a. ed. 1990.
- Manera de una psique sin cuerpo (1973) ISBN 84-7223-542-4
- Obras completas (1974-1995) ISBN 950-05-0584-3
  - Adriana Buenos Aires : última novela mala Buenos Aires, Corregidor, 1974 (Obras completas, vol. V; Adolfo de Obieta, editor); (1998) ISBN 84-8307-127-4
  - Teorías, Buenos Aires, Corregidor, 1974 (Obras completas, vol. III; Adolfo de Obieta, editor); (1990) ISBN 950-05-0584-3
  - Museo de la Novela de la Eterna; primera novela buena. Buenos Aires, Corregidor, 1975 (Obras completas, vol. VI; Adolfo de Obieta, editor)
- Relato : cuentos, poemas y misceláneas (1987)
- Poesías completas (1991) ISBN 84-7522-265-X
- Todo y nada (1995)
- Textos selectos (1999) ISBN 950-05-1181-9
- Macedonio : memorias errantes (1999) ISBN 978-98797654-0-1

=== In English translation ===
- Macedonio : selected writings in translation edited by Jo Anne Engelbert, Latitudes Press 1984, ISBN 978-9995878801.
- The Museum of Eterna's Novel (The First Good Novel) translated by Margaret Schwartz (2010) published by Open Letter Books

=== Correspondence ===
- Epistolario. Buenos Aires, Corregidor, 1976. (Obras completas, vol. II, Alicia Borinsky, editor).
- Correspondencia, 1922-1939 : crónica de una amistad with Jorge Luis Borges (2000) ISBN 950-05-1258-0
