= María Rosa Lojo =

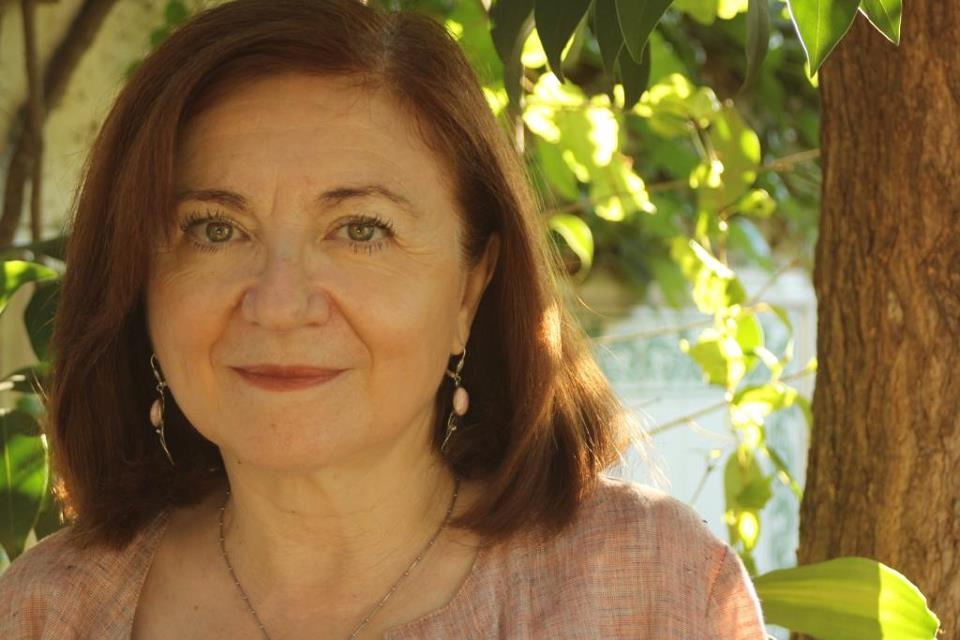
A picture of Writer María Rosa Lojo, at her house in Castelar(2014).

María Rosa Lojo (born 1954) is an author born in Buenos Aires. She directs two research projects and offers a doctoral seminar at the Universidad del Salvador. She is a longstanding contributor to the Literary Supplement of La Nación in Buenos Aires. In addition, she coordinated the international team of researchers that put together the critical edition of Ernesto Sabato’s Sobre héroes y tumbas (“On Heroes and Tombs”) for the archival collection at UNESCO. She was invited to represent Argentina at international fairs and congresses, and also serves as a juror in literary competitions.

== Works ==
Her published work includes three books of poetry; the novels La pasión de los nómades (The Passion of Nomads, 1994), La princesa federal (The Federalist Princess, 1998), Una mujer de fin de siglo (A Woman of Century’s End, 1999), Las Libres del Sur (Free Women of the South, 2004), and Finisterre (2005); and the collections of short narratives Historias ocultas en la Recoleta (Stories Hidden in the Recoleta, 2000) and Amores insólitos de nuestra historia (Singular Loves, 2001). Finisterre has been translated into Galician and published as A fin da terra (Galaxia, 2006). Brett Alan Sanders’ English translations of her poetry and prose have appeared in The Saint Ann's Review, Chelsea, Stand Magazine, The Antigonish Review, Perihelion, Artful Dodge, Event, New Works Review, Hunger Mountain, Rhino, Mudlark: An Electronic Journal of Poetry & Poetics, Contemporary Verse 2, PRISM International, and The Dirty Goat.

== Family ==
Her father, a Republican from Galicia, had exiled himself to Argentina after the Civil War.
