= Ricardo Molinari =

Argentine poet

Ricardo Eufemio Molinari (20 May 1898 – 31 July 1996) was an Argentine poet.

== Early life and education ==
Molinari was born in Buenos Aires on 20 May 1898 and was orphaned when he was five. He was raised by his Uruguayan maternal grandmother in the Buenos Aires neighborhood of Villa Urquiza.

Molinari left his studies to dedicate himself to poetry.

== Career ==
Molinari's poetic influences were Spanish classic poetry such as the romance, the copla, and the sonnet, plus French poetry, in particular the poet Mallarmé.

As a young man, he contributed to the avant-garde Argentinian literary magazine Martín Fierro, along with other writers as Jorge Luis Borges, whom he befriended.

His first book of poetry was El imaginero, published in 1927.

In 1933, he travelled to Spain, where he met with the Spanish poets of the Generation of '27.

Molinari worked as a modest civil servant in the National Congress of Argentina until his retirement.

In 1958, he was awarded the Argentine National Prize for Poetry for his work Unida Noche, and in 1968 he became a member of the country's Academia Argentina de Letras.

One of his most famous books is also one of his last: La escudilla (1973). The poetry collection Las sombras del pájaro tostado (1975) collects almost all of his works.

== Major works ==
- Una rosa para Stefan George 1934
- El tabernáculo, 1937
- La corona, 1939
- El alejado, 1943
- Mundos de la madrugada, 1943
- Esta rosa oscura del aire, 1949
- Días donde la tarde es un pájaro, 1954
- Cinco canciones a una paloma que es el alma, 1955
- Oda a la pampa, 1956
- La hoguera transparente, 1970
- La escudilla, 1973
