= Pedro Goyena =

Argentine jurist, politician, and writer

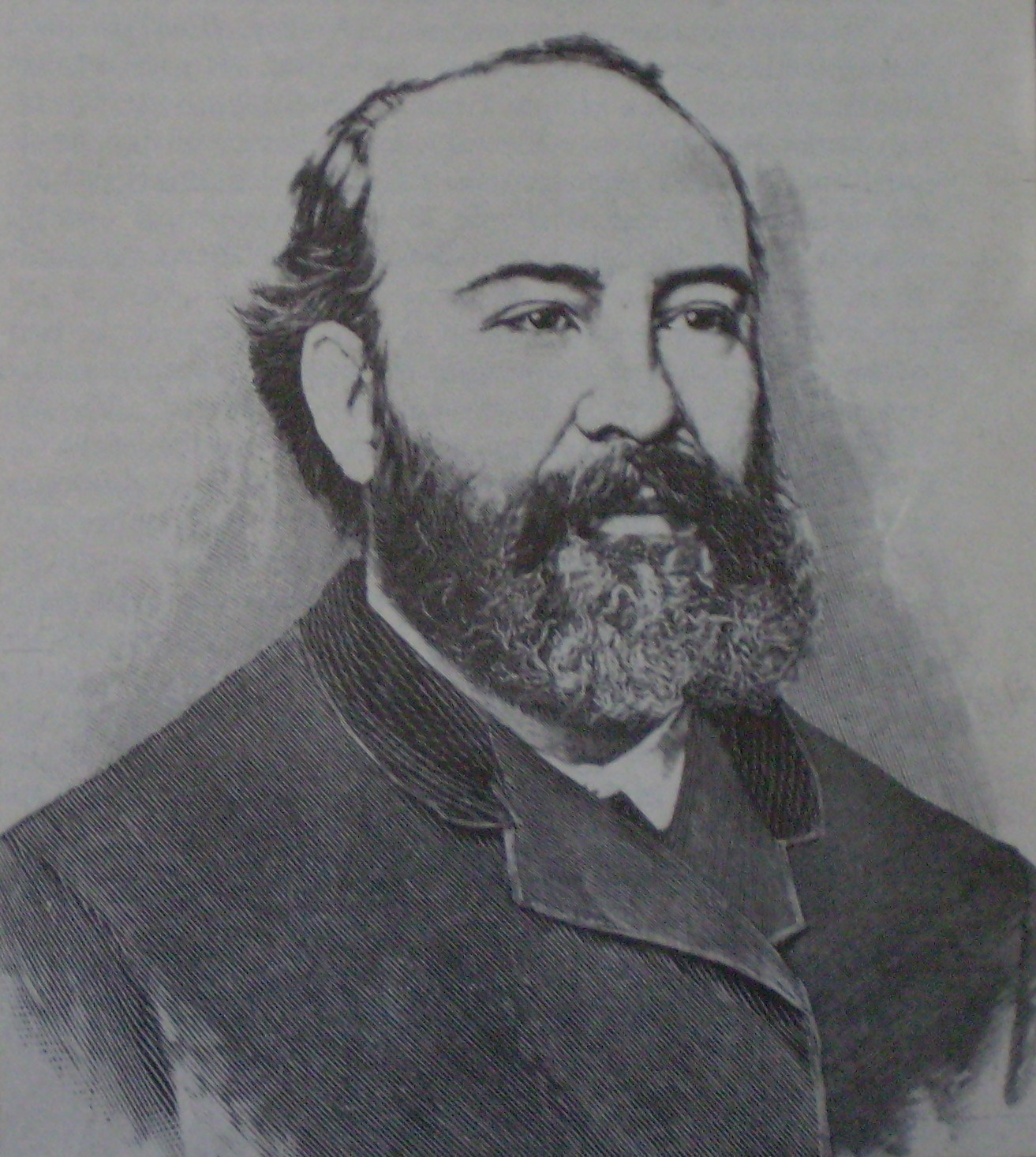
Pedro Goyena

Pedro Goyena (July 24, 1843, Buenos Aires – May 17, 1892) was an Argentine jurist, politician, journalist and writer.

Pedro Goyena, along with other thinkers and politicians, followers of the Catholic Thinking, as José Manuel Estrada and Emilio Lamarca. He completed his studies at the Colegio Nacional Central, then to the University to get a Law Degree. He made a mark in Argentine politics with his strong opposition to laicity, which characterized the Generation of '80 that governed the country in the second half of the 19th century and the beginnings of the 20th. He served a term as a member of the Buenos Aires Province Senate.

He had a strong impact in the Pedagogical Congress of 1882 where he maintained the position that public education had to be Catholic having a heated debate with Leandro Alem. He opposed Public Education Law #1420 of 1884, that established schooling for children being free, secular, and mandatory. He also opposed and represented the position of the Catholic thinkers against the Law of Civil matrimony of 1888, maintaining that the only type of marriage allowed should be the one performed and recognized by the Catholic Church. He was noted as a good orator.

Goyena taught Roman law at the Universidad de Buenos Aires and also worked as a journalist, writing among others for Revista Argentina and La Unión, which he also edited with Estrada and Tristán Achával Rodríguez, where he defended his opposition to the liberal reforms of the government of the time, whose principal exponent was President Julio A. Roca.

In 1885 he was appointed First Vice president of the Catholic Union, presided by José Manuel Estrada.

Shortly before his death, and carried by his opposition to secular liberalism, he joined the heterogeneous opposition represented by the Unión Cívica.

A street in the barrio of Caballito in Buenos Aires is named after him.

== Bibliography ==
- Corbiere, Emilio J. "Liberales y católicos en el 80". Todo es Historia. 1980 (163).
- Cosmelli Ibañez, José Luis (1975). Historia cultural de los argentinos. Buenos Aires: Troquel.
