= Aníbal Cristobo =

Argentine writer (1971–2026)

- Born: Aníbal Cristobo; 1 September 1971 Lanús, Buenos Aires Province, Argentina
- Died: 17 March 2026 (aged 54) Barcelona, Spain
- Occupation: Writer, poet, critic
- Language: Spanish, Portuguese

Aníbal Cristobo (1 September 1971 – 17 March 2026) was an Argentine writer. He published poems and poetry books, as well as collaborations as editor.

== Life and career ==
Cristobo lived six years in Rio de Janeiro, where he published his first works. He moved to Barcelona in 2002. Cristobo then published Castilian and Portuguese language books of poetry, and worked in other media. He received awards for literature in Spain. In 2009, Cristobo began to publish poems and drawings online.

Cristobo died in Barcelona on 17 March 2026, at the age of 54.

== Works ==
His latest works were published in digital form:

- Deutschkurs (2008)
- Krillsongs : en vivo en Berlín (2007)

== Books ==
- Teste da iguana (1997); Poemas
- Jet-lag (2002); Poemas
- Krill (2002); Poemas
- Miniaturas Kinéticas (2005); Recopilacion

=== Poems ===
==== Jet-Lag (2002) ====
- Una Ballena Blanca (Check-In)
- Última Cena En Buenos Aires
- Millas Que Cuenta, Describe Así (Mariana Bustelo)
- Melatonina
- Jet-Lag (Rio de Janeiro)
- Sulfur
- Lo Que Piensa El Contacto (Voces del 23) - (Carlito Azevedo)
- Jet-Lag (Lisbon)
- Chica Jet-Lager (The Yorimichi Dog) - (Andi Nachon)
- Jet-Lag (Barcelona)
- Una Ballena Blanca (Desembarque)
- + Extras: Contagio (Inédito)
- + Extras: Epilamvanein (Inédito)
- + Extras: TraumatismoS (Inédito)

==== Krill (2002) ====
- + Krill (2002)
- Ñandú
- Cielo del Siamés
- Hija del Pastizal
- Jonestown 1978
- El Oso
- Hija del Pastizal (Western Version)
- Dos al Borde del Estanque
- Playa de Invierno
- Dos Fotos de Kathy En Necochea
- Junco de la Intuición
- Ghost Writer
- Hija del Pastizal (Un Ruido Más Allá)
- Sonido
- Krill (El Sueño del Buzo)
- Los Ladrones
- Crustácea
- Los Animales Viejos
- La Tibia Muerte de Carl
- Hija del Pastizal (Caribbean Version)
- Krill (El Noticiero de la Tarde)
- Atrape Al Asesino (19 Sospechosos)
- 3:40 A.M.: K. Y La Chica Indiana En El Denver
- Tema de Amor de Krill
- Distancias Inconmensurables
- Negativo del Asesino
- Hija del Pastizal (Una Canción)
- Sombra de la Jirafa
- El Asesino
- Krill (Caja Oscura)
- Lago
- Hija del Pastizal (Manga Version)
- Finn
- Krill (Diez Segundos Finales)
- El Asesino (Las Otras Voces)
- Ningún Viaje
- Una Muchacha Pálida
- El Asesino (Gas Lacrimógeno)
- Hija del Pastizal (Galactic Version)
- Krill (Una Perla)
- + Extras: The Old Men Admiring Themselves In The Water (W. B. Yeats)
- + Extras: Distâncias Incomensuráveis Ii (Lu Menezes)
- + Extras: Sobre Una Fotonovela de Felipe Nepomuceno (Carlito Azevedo)
- + Extras: Conversación Incidental (Inédito)

==== Test de la Iguana (1997) ====
- + Test de la Iguana (1997)
- Los Gatos de John Cage
- Cielo del Allatolah
- Ezster
- Vaimer
- No Deberías Haber Hecho Eso
- Off
- Amuleto
- Test de la Iguana
- UFO, Agosto del '75
- Guajiro Killer
- Bloody Mary
- Gruta de los Vampiros
- Playing Cards
- Single Cacto
- Aljibe
- Puzzle de Montañas Chinas
- Las Operaciones de la Libertad
- Virgin
- Single Cacto Ii
- Otro Pasajero Húngaro
- + Extras: Los Gatos de Merce Cunningham (Eduardo Jorge)
