= Prisma (magazine) =

Prisma was a Catalan magazine that was first published in September 1930 in Vilanova i la Geltrú and continued until 15 July 1936. In the beginning it appeared every month and it was directed by Ramon Ferrer i Parera but on 1 April 1936, it started being directed by Manuel Amat. The editorial office was situated in the Street Rambla Macià in the town of Vilanova.

Regarding the format of the magazine, it had a measurement of 2780x220 mm and it had 16 pages. After the change of director in 1936, the number started having a measurement of 333 x355 mm with 8 pages with 4 columns each. Moreover, it started being published every fortnight and it cost 35 cents of peseta. This magazine continued with the numeration from the first moments and it had the same characters and themes. From the first period they appeared 22 numbers, the last one in December 1935. In total, 30 numbers were published.

== Themes and Collaborators ==
It was a high quality magazine which was dedicated to arts and literature and it was beautifully illustrated. The illustrations were done by Joaquin Mir Trinxet, A. de Cabanyes, Enric C. Ricart, M. Torrents, Joan Llaverias, Salvador Mestres, among others. The first number contained originals signed by J. Blanch Ros, Teresa Miro, Manuel Amat, N. Omar Robin, Francesc Casals and Francesc Muntaner. The title of the magazine was designed by P. Serra Briones (Peseb) and Salvador Mestres.

In the magazine, they were portrayed the artistic and literary values from Vilanova i la Geltrú. Furthermore, the illustrations usually consisted in reproductions of drawings and fabrics from the artists of this town.
