= Carlos Mastronardi =

Argentine journalist, poet, and translator

Carlos Mastronardi (1901 – June 5, 1976) was an Argentine journalist, poet, and translator. His works included Luz de provincia, Tierra amanecida (1926), Conocimiento de la noche (1937), and Tratado de la pena. His non-fiction Valéry o la infinitud del método (Valéry, or the infinitude of method) won the Buenos Aires Municipal Prize for Literature (1955). Other important works of non-fiction included Formas de la realidad nacional (Forms of the National Reality, 1961) and Memorias de un Provinciano (Memoirs of a Man from the Provinces, 1967). Some of his journalism was published posthumously as Cuadernos de vivir y pensar (Notebooks of Living and Thinking, 1984).

As a translator, Mastronardi was mainly known for translating the French Symbolist poets into Spanish. As a poet, although identified personally with the avant-garde of his time, he wrote largely in traditional forms rather than free verse, and rejected what he viewed as his contemporaries' excessive use of metaphor.

Born in Gualeguay, Entre Ríos Province, Mastronardi came to Buenos Aires at the age of 19. There he became a member of the Martín Fierro group (also known as the Florida group) and an intimate of Jorge Luis Borges, although they disagreed strongly about questions about aesthetics and poetry. Mastronardi figures as a minor character in Borges's short story Tlön, Uqbar, Orbis Tertius.

Mastronardi led a notoriously nocturnal existence. Writing of Mastronardi in 1986 in the newspaper El País (Madrid), Borges said of Mastronardi that "Like Auguste Dupin ... [the detective character created by Edgar Allan Poe] ... at night he went about the streets of Buenos Aires looking for that intellectual stimulus that only can be given by nighttime in a great city."

After a long period in which his work fell into obscurity, Mastronardi's works are (as of 2003) being re-published by Argentina's Universidad Nacional del Litoral.

== Quotation ==
"Lyric poetry, for many of its ... [Argentine] ... practitioners, lacks all plan and requires no sacrifice. It allows the writer to follow the path of least resistance: everything consists of letting things be. In contrast, narrative, criticism, and essays (almost uncultivated among us), demand preparatory work and organic development."
