= Martín Fierro =

Argentine epic poem by José Hernández

El Gaucho Martín Fierro
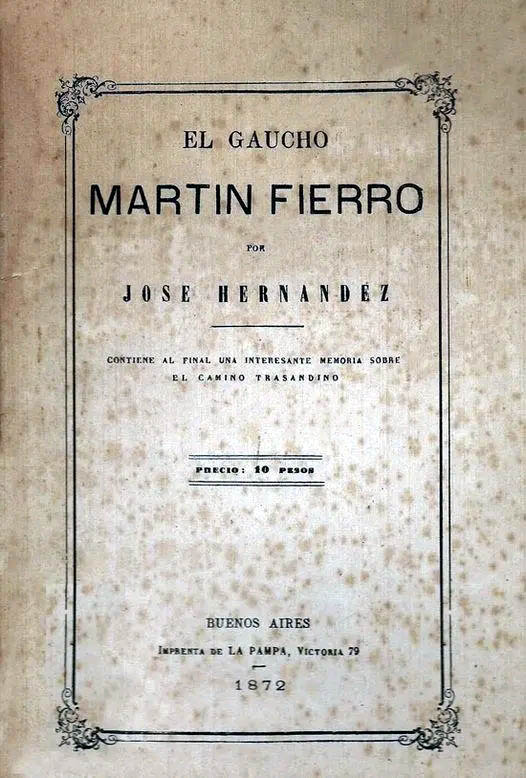
- Cover to the first edition of the book, 1872
- Author: José Hernández
- Language: Spanish
- Genre: National epic poem
- Publisher: Imprenta de la Pampa
- Publication date: 1872
- Publication place: Argentina
- Followed by: La vuelta de Martín Fierro
- Text: El Gaucho Martín Fierro at Wikisource

Martín Fierro, also known as El Gaucho Martín Fierro, is a 2,316-line epic poem by the Argentine writer José Hernández. The poem was originally published in two parts, El Gaucho Martín Fierro (1872) and La Vuelta de Martín Fierro (1879). The poem supplied a historical link to the gauchos' contribution to the national development of Argentina, for the gaucho had played a major role in Argentina's independence from Spain.

The poem, written in a Spanish that evokes rural Argentina, is widely seen as the pinnacle of the genre of "gauchesque" poetry (poems centered on the life of the gaucho, written in a style known as payadas) and a touchstone of Argentine national identity. It has appeared in hundreds of editions and has been translated into over 70 languages.

Martín Fierro has earned major praise and commentaries from Leopoldo Lugones, Miguel de Unamuno, Jorge Luis Borges (see also Borges on Martín Fierro) and Rafael Squirru, among others. The Martín Fierro Award, named after the poem, is the most respected award for Argentine television and radio programs.

== Plot ==
=== El Gaucho Martín Fierro ===
In El Gaucho Martín Fierro, the eponymous protagonist is an impoverished Gaucho named Martín Fierro who has been drafted to serve at a border fort, defending the Argentine inner frontier against the native people. His life of poverty on the pampas is somewhat romanticized; his military experiences are not. He deserts and tries to return to his home, but discovers that his house, farm, and family are gone. He deliberately provokes an affair of honor by insulting a black woman in a bar. In the knife duel that ensues, he kills her male companion. The narration of another knife fight suggests, by its lack of detail, that it is one of many. Fierro becomes an outlaw pursued by the police militia. In a battle with them, he acquires a companion: Sergeant Cruz, inspired by Fierro's bravery in resistance, defects and joins him mid-battle. The two set out to live among the natives, hoping to find a better life there.

=== La Vuelta de Martín Fierro ===
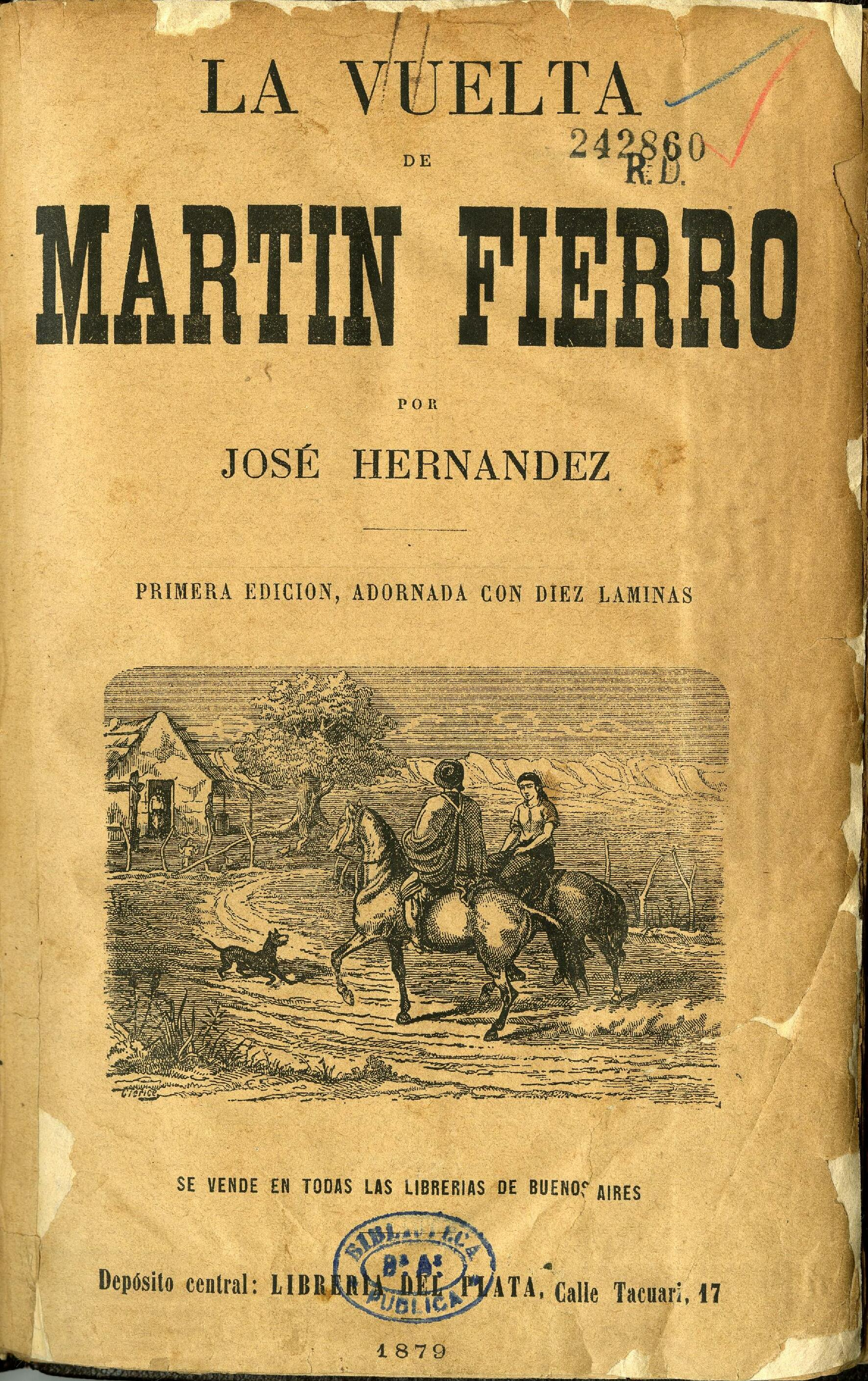
Cover of 1879 first edition of La Vuelta de Martín Fierro

In La Vuelta de Martín Fierro (released in 1879), readers discover that their hope of a better life is promptly and bitterly dashed. They are taken for spies; the cacique (chieftain) saves their lives, but they are effectively prisoners of the natives. In this context Hernández presents another, and very unsentimentalized, version of rural life. The poem narrates an epidemic, the horrible, expiatory attempts at cure, and the fatal wrath upon those, including a young "Christian" boy, suspected of bringing the plague. Both Cruz and the cacique die of the disease. Shortly afterward, at Cruz's grave, Fierro hears the anguished cries of a woman. He follows and encounters a criolla weeping over the body of her dead son, her hands tied with the boy's entrails. She had been accused of witchcraft. Fierro fights and wins a brutal battle with her captor and travels with her back towards civilization.

After Fierro leaves the woman at the first ranch they see, he goes on to an encounter that raises the story from the level of the mildly naturalistic to the mythic. He encounters his two surviving sons (one has been a prisoner, the other the ward of the vile and wily Vizcacha), and the son of Cruz (who has become a gambler). He has a night-long payada (singing duel) with a black payador (singer), who turns out to be the younger brother of the man Fierro murdered in a duel. At the end, Fierro speaks of changing his name and living in peace, but it is not entirely clear that the duel has been avoided (Borges wrote a short story (El Fin) in which this possibility is played out).

== Style and structure ==
Like his predecessors in "gauchesque" poetry, Hernández sticks to the eight-syllable line of the payadas, the rural ballads. However, Hernández also uses a rhyming six-line stanza ("like the six strings of a guitar", said Lugones) with a novel invention. The first line is kept "free" and unrhymed, allowing Hernández to present a "thesis" to the stanza without having to worry about the last word being part of the rhyme scheme. Lines two, three and six rhyme together while lines four and five constitute an independent rhyming group. The first verse of the poem illustrates this structure of six eight-syllable lines. (Note that, in Spanish prosody, vowels from adjacent words are considered to conjoin and form a single syllable, as marked here with a diagonal slash /, and verses ending in a stressed syllable behave as if they had an additional syllable at the end, marked with (+) .)

1   A-      quí     me      pon-    go/a    can-    tar     (+)      Aquí me pongo a cantar
2   al      com-    pás     de      la      vi-     güe-    la,      Al compás de la vigüela
3   que/al  hom-    bre     que     lo      des-    ve-     la       Que al hombre que lo desvela
4   u-      na      pe-     na/es-  tror-   di-     na-     ria,     Una pena estrordinaria,
5   co-     mo      la/a-   ve      so-     li-     ta-     ria      Como la ave solitaria
6   con     el      can-    tar     se      con-    sue-    la.      Con el cantar se consuela.

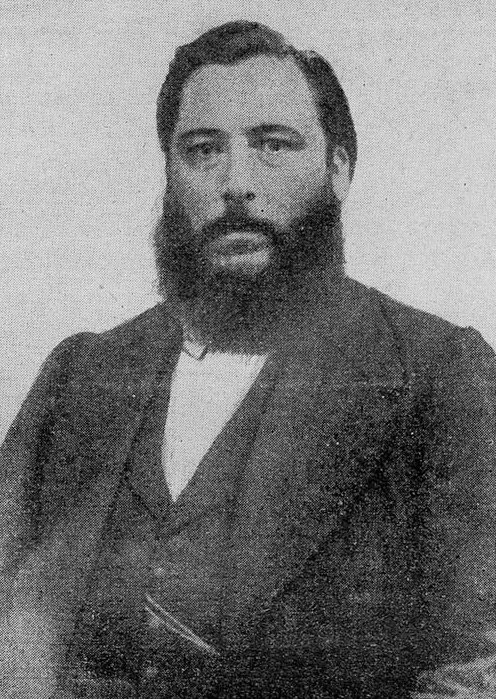
José Hernández, author

Unlike his predecessors, Hernández, who had himself spent half his life alongside the gauchos in the pampas, in the regular army brigades that took part in Argentina's civil wars and more years engaged in the border wars, does not seek out every rural colloquialism under the sun. He hews much closer to the actual payadores, using a mildly archaic style and giving a sense of place more through phonetic spellings than through choice of words. At times - especially in the payadas within the larger poem - he rises to a particularly stark and powerful poetry, taking on romantic and even metaphysical themes. In La Vuelta de Martín Fierro, at the time Fierro is returning to the "Christian" world, he talks of his notoriety, apparently, in an echo of a plot point in the second book of Don Quixote, as a result of the fame of El Gaucho Martín Fierro.

The style of the poem shifts several times along the way. Nominally, Martín Fierro is a first-person narrator, but the distance between his voice and that of Hernández varies at different points in the poem. The poem moves from a sentimental and romantic evocation of rural life to a brutal work of protest against military conscription and garrison life at the border forts; then it becomes an extended outlaw ballad of the life of a violent knife-fighting gaucho matrero; then it becomes a story of captivity among the Indians, followed finally by bringing its protagonist face-to-face with a series of human echoes of his past. This last set of encounters is so improbable that some commentators suggest that the episode with the black payador is actually a figment of Fierro's imagination.

== Critical and popular reception ==
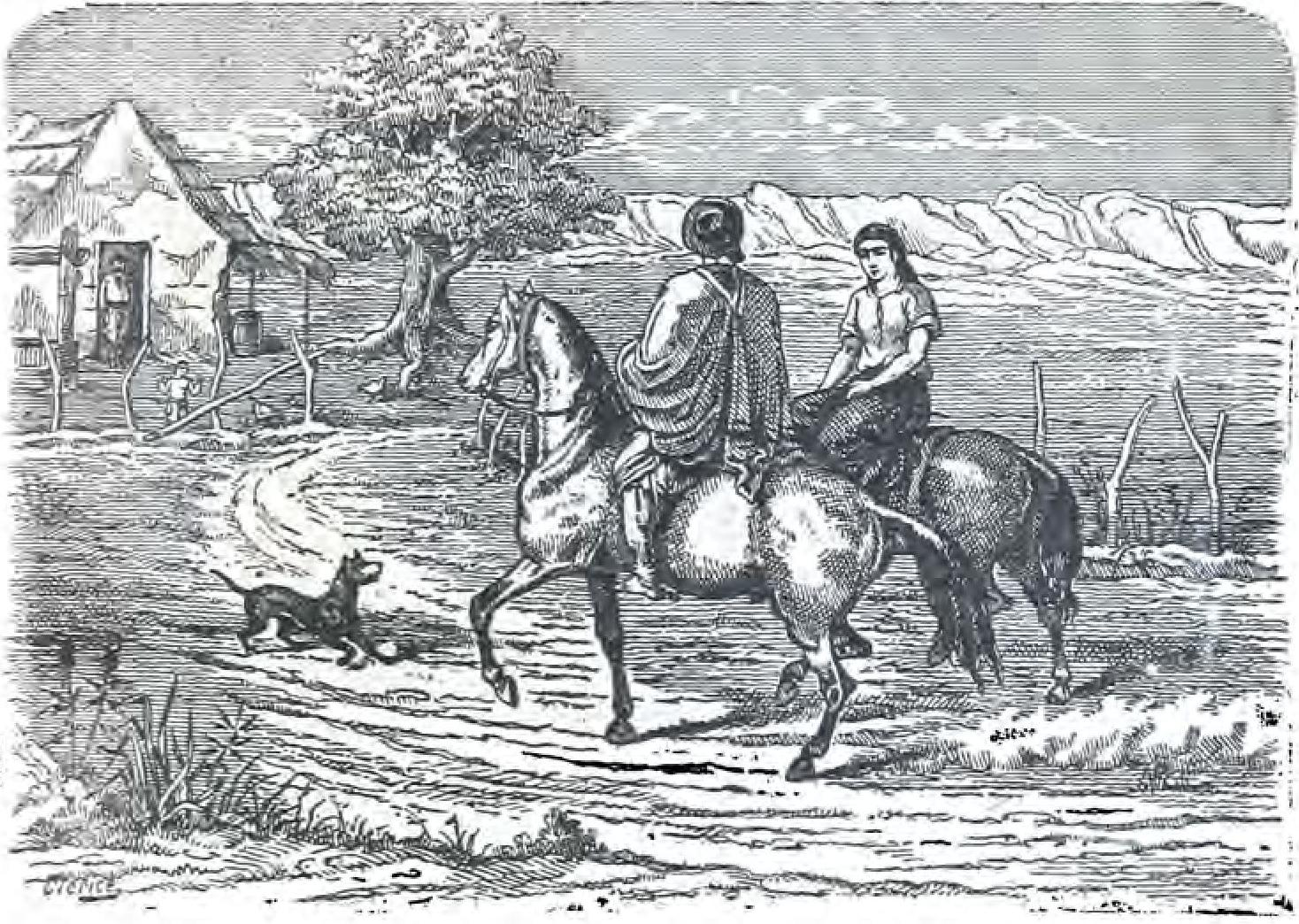
Artwork for a Martín Fierro second edition (1879), by Charles Clérice

Martín Fierro was an immediate popular success; it was also generally well received by the critics, although it required more than a generation for the work to be accorded the status of a classic.

Borges, who describes the work as more of a "verse novel" than an "epic", points out that this is partly because it is such an accurate evocation of its own time that it took some distance before its greatness could become apparent.

The popular success of the work is unquestionable: at the time of the publication of the second part of the poem, the first part already had 48,000 copies in print in Argentina and Uruguay, almost unimaginable for that time. It was sold not only in bookstores but in pulperías (rural bars), and was frequently read aloud as a public entertainment.

The poem received its canonization during a series of lectures by Leopoldo Lugones in 1913 (published as El payador in 1916), where the eminent Argentine poet crowned the Martín Fierro the epic of Argentina, comparable to Dante's Divine Comedy for Italy or Cervantes's Don Quixote for Spain. Ricardo Rojas went way beyond Lugones, claiming the poem to deal, at least metaphorically, with almost every issue of Argentine history, even though, as Borges remarks, most of these aspects are notable in the poem mostly for their absence.

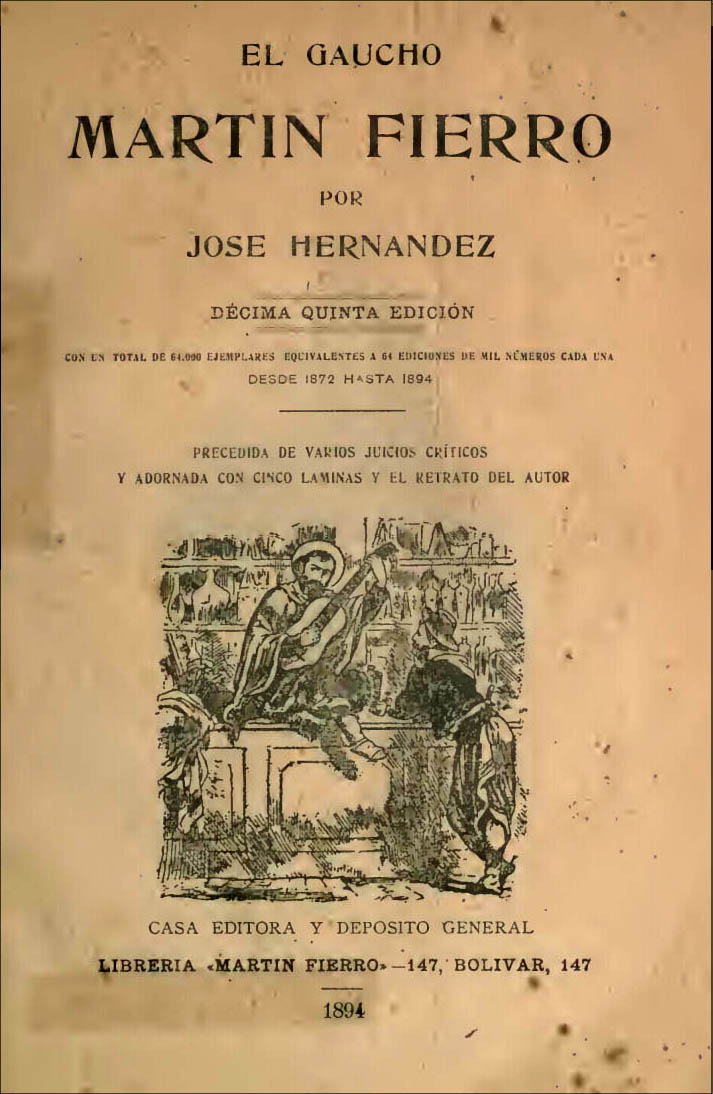
One of the early editions of Martín Fierro, published in 1894

Previously in 1894, the Spanish poet and critic Miguel de Unamuno tried, indirectly, to claim the work for Spain, calling it the "most Spanish" of Latin American literature. Eleuterio Tiscornia brought to the work a critical approach akin to European philology which seems, on the surface, incommensurate with the work in question (see Borges and Ezequiel Martínez Estrada's short-sighted attack on Tiscornia). However today, the scholarly approach of Tiscornia and others, such as Francisco Castro and Santiago Lugones, have helped make the poem accessible to those far from the Argentine context.

Among more contemporary critics, Calixto Oyuela tried to bring the focus back from the national to the individual, a critique similar to Martínez Estrada's; he emphasized that this is the story of a particular man, a gaucho in the last days of the open range; he sees the book as a meditation on origins, a protest and a lament for a disappearing way of life. In Folletos Lenguaraces, Vicente Rossi goes beyond Oyuela to pick up where Borges left off, by seeing Fierro as an "orillero", basically a hoodlum.

Borges, in his book-length collection of essays El "Martín Fierro", professes himself a great admirer of the work. "Argentine literature", he writes, "[...] includes at least one great book, Martín Fierro"—but emphasizes that its aesthetic merits should not be seen as corresponding to the merits of its protagonist. In particular, he characterizes as "unfortunate" that the Argentines read the story of Fierro forcing a duel of honor upon a man and ultimately killing him "with indulgence or admiration, rather than with horror".

Chilean writer Roberto Bolaño wrote in his essay Derivas de la pesada: "poetically Martín Fierro is not a marvel. But as a novel it is alive, full of significances to explore". He also stated that it was a "novel about liberty and filth, not about education and good manners" and that "it is a story about valour, not a story about intelligence and much less about morals."

== In popular culture ==
The Gaucho Martin Fierro by José Hernández, translated by Walter Owen, Shakespeare Head Press, 1935

In the 1920s, Borges and other avant-garde Argentine writers embracing "art for art's sake" published a magazine called Martín Fierro; they are often referred to collectively as the grupo Martín Fierro ("Martín Fierro group"), although at the time they were better known as the Florida group.

Juan José Castro set portions of the poem as a cantata for baritone, choir, and orchestra between 1944 and 1948.

In 1952 director Jacques Tourneur made Way of a Gaucho in Argentina for 20th Century Fox. The story about an orphan gaucho called Martín Peñalosa, who has deserted from the army and becomes the leader of a rebel group, follows the legend of Martín Fierro in many ways, although the film is based upon a book by Herbert Childs and a screenplay by Philip Dunne. In 2009 the film classic was finally released first time on DVD, but at the moment only in Spain, where the title of the film is Martín, el Gaucho.

The Martín Fierro Awards are the most prominent awards for Argentine radio and television. It is granted by APTRA, the Association of Argentine Television and Radio Journalists.

Leopoldo Torre Nilsson's classic Argentine film Martín Fierro (1968) is based on the poem. Fernando Solanas' 1972 Los Hijos de Fierro ('The Sons of Martín Fierro') is another Argentine classic film.

In 1972, Billiken magazine published comic books written by Héctor Germán Oesterheld and drawn by Carlos Roume.

In Thomas Pynchon's novel Gravity's Rainbow, a group of Argentine anarchists led by Francisco Squalidozzi collaborate with a German filmmaker, Gerhardt von Göll, to create a film version of Martín Fierro.

Songs named after the poem have been released by the Argentine singer/songwriter Juana Molina on her album Segundo and by the German band the Magic I.D. on their album till my breath gives out.

In 2017, Gabriela Cabezón Cámara published the novel Las aventuras de la China Iron, which reclaims the story of China Iron, Martín Fierro's abandoned wife, who is unnamed in the original epic poem.

== See also ==
- Día de la Tradición
- Don Segundo Sombra
- Santos Vega
