= Silvina Bullrich =

Argentine writer (1915–1990)

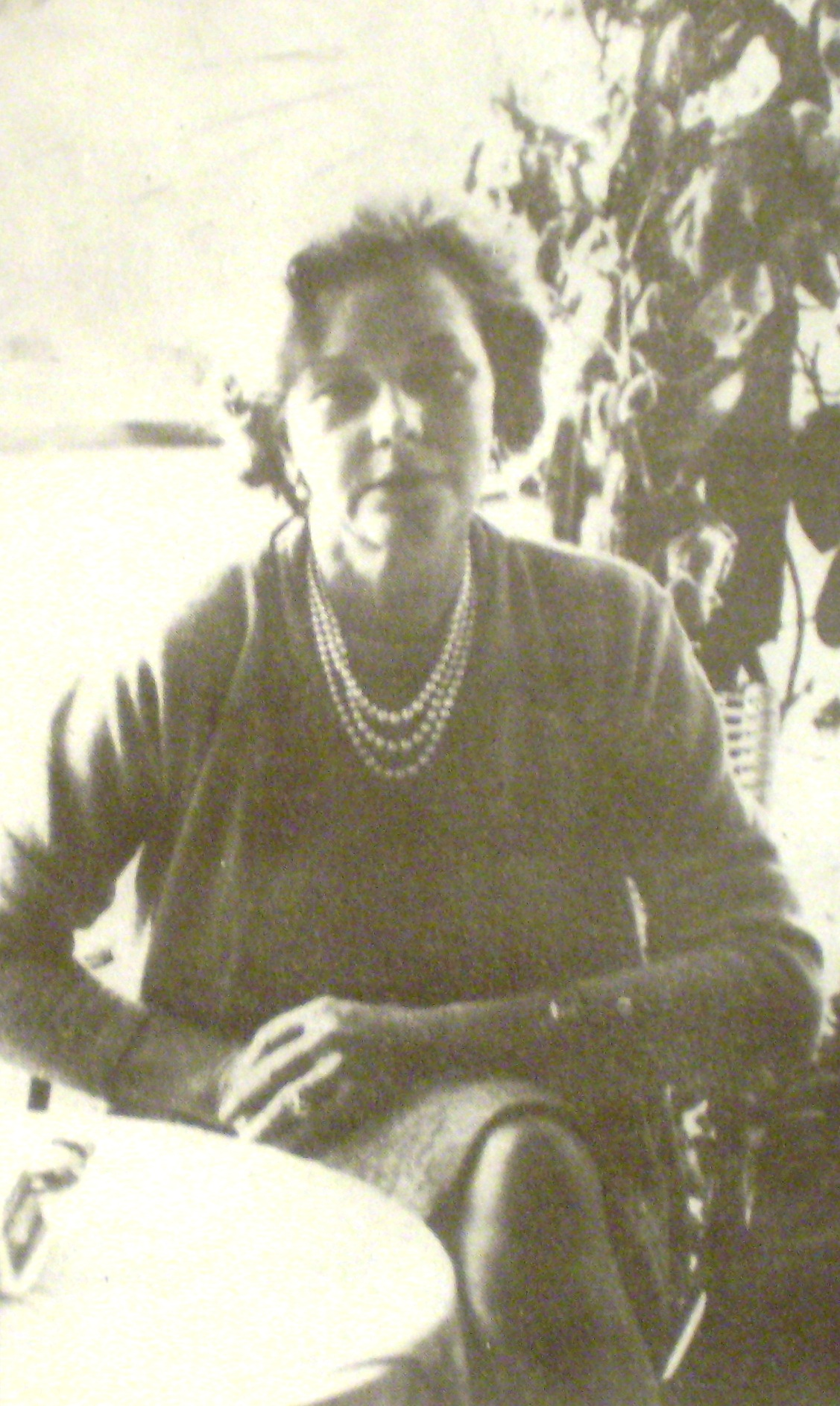
- Born: October 4, 1915; Buenos Aires, Argentina
- Died: July 2, 1990 (aged 74); Geneva, Switzerland
- Resting place: Jardín de Paz Cemetery; Pilar, Buenos Aires Province, Argentina
- Occupations: Novelist, professor and translator of French literature
- Writing career
- Language: Spanish
- Period: 1939–86
- Genre: Modernist literature
- Notable awards: Municipal Prize - Literature (1961); National Prize - Literature (1972)

Silvina Bullrich (October 4, 1915 – July 2, 1990) was a best-selling Argentine novelist, as well as a translator, screenwriter, critic, and academic. She was known in Argentina as la gran burguesa ("the great bourgeois lady").

== Life and work ==
Silvina Bullrich was born to María Laura Meyrelles de Bullrich, of Portuguese descent and to Rafael Bullrich (1877–1944), a distinguished Argentine cardiologist and Dean of the School of Medicine of the University of Buenos Aires. The second of three sisters, she was raised in a privileged background; despite the conservative Dr. Bullrich's disapproval, her mother occupied her free time introducing her daughters to classic literature and, unhappily married, frequently traveled with them to Paris, where Silvina's paternal grandfather had been a diplomat. She was unable to pursue a university diploma, but received a diploma in French language studies from the Buenos Aires Alliance Française.

She married Arturo Palenque in 1936 and had one son. Devoting herself to writing, she contributed literary reviews to La Nación (then Argentina's most-widely circulated daily) and in 1939, had a collection of poems (Vibraciones) and Calles de Buenos Aires ("Streets of Buenos Aires") published in Atlántida magazine. Befriending renowned writers Adolfo Bioy Casares and Jorge Luis Borges, in 1945 she collaborated with the latter in a collection of prose titled El compadrito ("The Poseur"). These early years in Bullrich's career were accompanied by a difficult phase in her life. Her husband, a lawyer aligned with Argentina's influential conservative Catholics, was not a good provider and this, coupled with his disapproval of his wife's work, led to their divorce in 1946. Bullrich also lost her father, elder sister and paternal grandmother during this interim, the latter two of whom she was particularly close with. These experiences were likewise reflected in much of her work, which continued to set young ladies brought up in comfortable circumstances against prolonged, unhappy relationships and relative penury.

This was first evident in Historia de un silencio ("History of a Silent Moment"); the 1949 novel, set in the popular weekend destination of Tigre and written from a man's perspective, secured her reputation in the Argentine literary scene. Her Bodas de cristal ("Crystal Jubilee," 1951) and Telefono ocupado ("Busy Signal," 1956) continued showing her preference for detailing private moments and for allowing her characters to criticize male chauvinism or a weak character in women privately and in thought. "Crystal Jubilee" was also her first commercial success and coincided with her marriage to Marcelo Dupont, a happy interlude in her life which ended with his losing his battle with a sudden cancer in 1956.

Bullrich was awarded the Municipal Literary Prize for El hechicero ("The Sorcerer") and Un momento muy largo ("A Lasting Moment") in 1961. She taught French literature at the National University of La Plata, and in 1962 invited to adapt French author Guy des Cars' novel Les Filles de joie ("Daughters of Happiness") into an Argentine film version; "A Lasting Moment" was likewise adapted into film with Bullrich's script in 1964. That year, she ventured into her first work dealing with social problems in Argentina, Los burgueses ("The Bourgeoisie"), which sold about 60,000 copies in Argentina and was translated into several languages;

Several of her other novels sold around 100,000 copies. Her Mañana digo basta ("Tomorrow I'll Say, Enough!") was likewise hailed as a compelling feminist argument following its 1968 publication; El mundo que yo vi ("The World I Saw," 1969) was a well-received account of her extensive travels through Europe and Asia; and her Los pasajeros del jardín ("Wanderers in the Garden"), a sentimental account of her marriage with Marcelo Dupont, earned her a National Literary Prize in 1972. Her continued success led to a 1975 film adaptation of her novel "Crystal Jubilee," for which she wrote the screenplay. Continuing to write as a means of exposing deep-seated national problems, she published an indictment of Argentina's cumbersome and often corrupt judicial system in Será justicia ("There Will Be Justice," a protocol closing phrase found in all legal briefs in Argentina). Published in 1976, this work coincided with the advent of Argentina's brutal last dictatorship and was the last of Bullrich's acclaimed works. She thereafter limited herself to less controversial novels (without abandoning her feminist points of view) and her memoirs, published in 1980.

Bullrich translated Les filles de joie for the screen, as well as Argentine editions of works by Simone de Beauvoir, Beatrix Beck, Graham Greene, Louis Jouvet, and George Sand (about whom she also wrote a biography in 1946). She contributed to an acclaimed 1984 documentary, Eva Perón: quien quiera oír que oiga ("Listen if You Want"); while not a Peronist, Bullrich's commentary highlighted the late first lady's significance to the role of women in Argentina. Remaining close to her friend and former collaborator, Jorge Luis Borges, Bullrich visited him shortly before his death in Geneva in 1986, and published her last work, La bicicleta, that year. A commentary on the country's recent financial crisis, "the bicycle" is also a slang term in Argentina analogous to "robbing Peter to pay Paul." A long-time smoker, she developed lung cancer and soon herself relocated to Geneva, seeking specialized medical care; Bullrich died there in 1990. She was buried in the Jardín de Paz cemetery in Pilar, Buenos Aires.

== Bibliography ==
- Cócaro, Nicolás. Silvina Bullrich. Ediciones Culturales Argentinas, 1979.
- Frouman-Smith, Erica. Spanish American Women Writers: Silvina Bullrich. Marting, Diane (editor). Greenwood Publishing Group, 1990.

== See also ==
- Lists of writers
