= José Hernández (writer) =

Argentine writer (1834–1886)

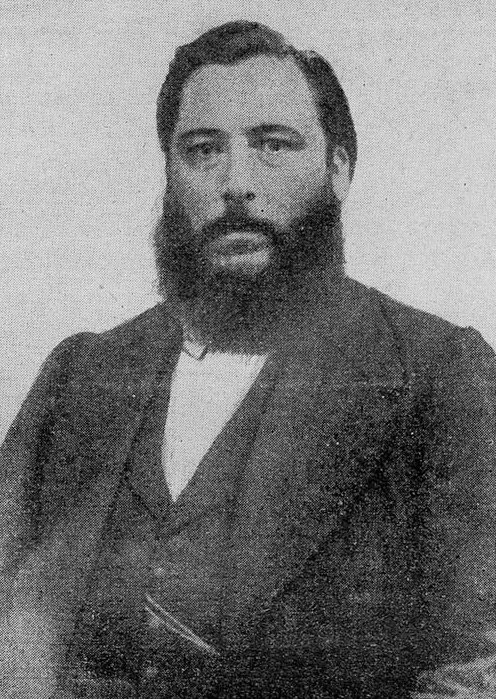
- Hernández, c. 1875
- Born: José Rafael Hernández y Pueyrredón; 10 November 1834 near San Martín, Buenos Aires Province, Argentina
- Died: 21 October 1886 (aged 51); Belgrano, Argentina
- Resting place: La Recoleta Cemetery
- Writing career
- Genre: Gaucho literature
- Notable work: Martín Fierro
- Movement: National Autonomist Party

José Hernández (born José Rafael Hernández y Pueyrredón; 10 November 1834 in Chacras del Perdriel – 21 October 1886 in Buenos Aires) was an Argentine journalist, poet, and politician best known as the author of the epic poem Martín Fierro. In his tribute, his birthday is celebrated in Argentina as a national holiday, called Tradition Day.

== Biography ==
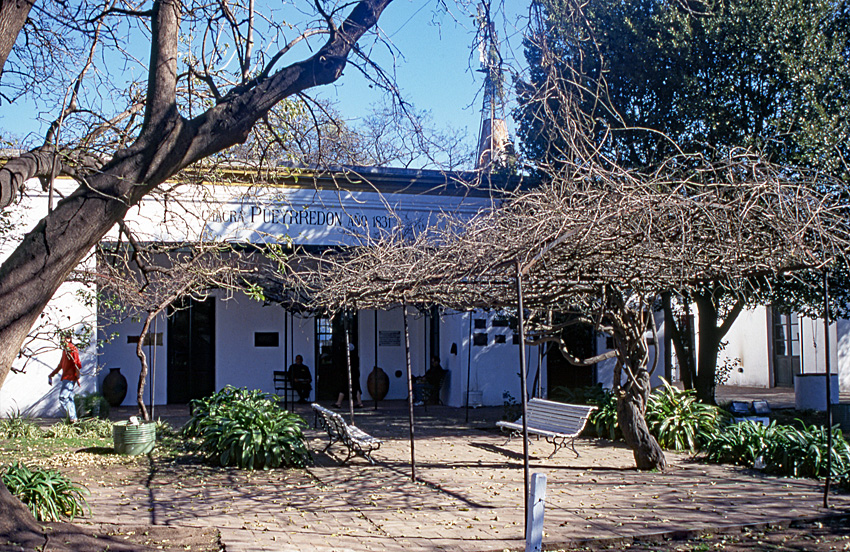
Chacra Pueyrredon, birthplace of José Hernández

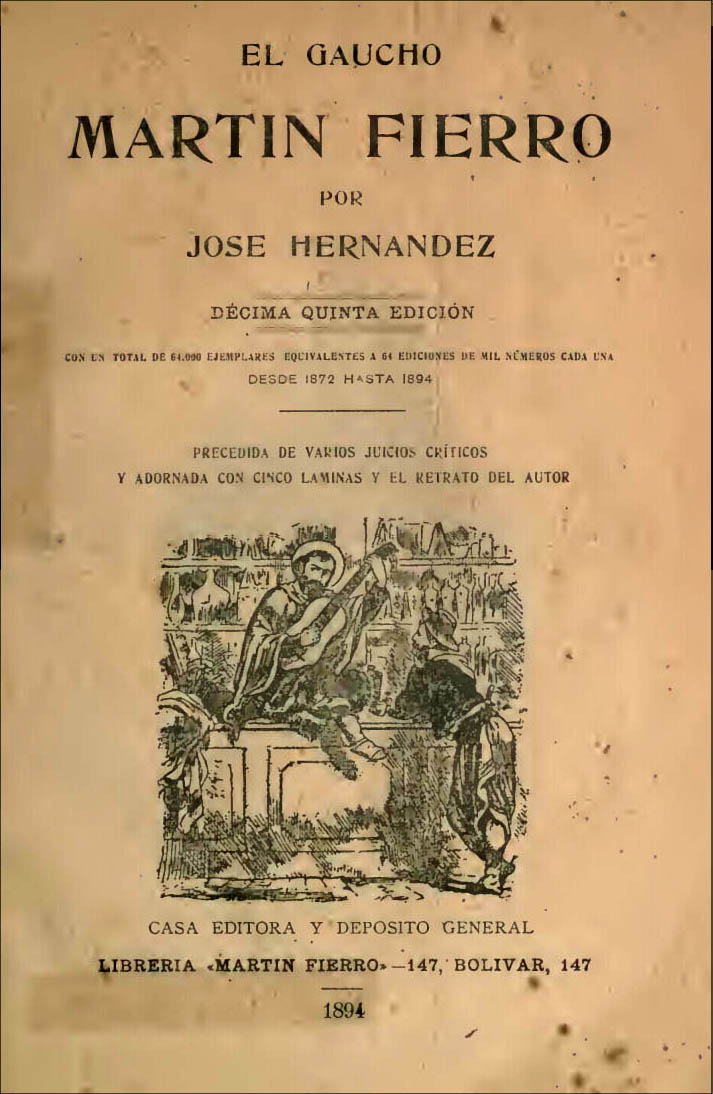
Martín Fierro, Hernández's magnum opus.

Hernández, whose ancestry was Spanish, was born on a farm near San Martín, Buenos Aires Province. His father was a majordomo or foreman of a series of cattle ranches. His career was to be an alternation between stints on the Federal side in the civil wars of Argentina and Uruguay and life as a newspaperman, a short stint as an employee of a commercial firm, and a period as stenographer to the legislature of the Confederation.

Hernández founded the newspaper El Río de la Plata, which advocated local autonomy, abolition of the conscripted "frontier contingents", and election of justices of the peace, military commanders, and school boards. He opposed immigration because he believed it undermined the pastoral foundation of the region's wealth. He envisioned a federal republic based on pastoralism, but also featuring a strong system of education and a literate population.

Although a federalist opposed to the centralizing, modernizing, and Europeanizing tendencies of President Domingo Sarmiento, Hernández was not an apologist for General Juan Manuel de Rosas, whom he characterized as a tyrant and a despot.

Hernández is known today almost exclusively for his masterpiece Martín Fierro, the epic poem that stands as the pinnacle of gauchesque literature. The poem was apparently begun during a period of exile in Brazil following the defeat at Ñaembé (1870) and was published in two parts (in 1872 and 1879).

Hernández died of heart disease on 21 October 1886, in Belgrano, which was at that time a separate suburb and is currently a neighborhood of the city of Buenos Aires. He was buried in La Recoleta Cemetery in Buenos Aires.
