= Argentina =

Country in South America

Argentine Republic República Argentina (Spanish)
- Flag Coat of arms
- Motto: En unión y libertad "In Union and Freedom"
- Anthem: Himno Nacional Argentino "Argentine National Anthem"
- Sol de Mayo "Sun of May"

- Location of Argentina Territory claimed but not controlled
- Capital and largest city: Buenos Aires; 34°36′S 58°23′W
- National language: Spanish (Note: Though not declared official de jure, the Spanish language is the only one used in the wording of laws, decrees, resolutions, official documents and public acts thus making it the de facto official language.)
- Regional languages: Guaraní in Corrientes; Quechua in Santiago del Estero; Qom, Mocoví, and Wichí in Chaco; Welsh in Chubut
- Ethnic groups (2022): 79.4% White; 16.3% Mestizo; 2.8% Indigenous; 1.5% others
- Religion (2019): 79.6% Christianity; 18.9% no religion; 1.2% others; 0.3% unspecified
- Demonyms: Argentine; Argentinian; Argentinean
- Government: Federal presidential republic
  - President: Javier Milei
  - Vice President: Victoria Villarruel
  - Chief of the Cabinet of Ministers: Diego Santilli
  - President of the Chamber of Deputies: Martín Menem
  - President of Supreme Court: Horacio Rosatti
- Legislature: National Congress
  - Upper house: Senate
  - Lower house: Chamber of Deputies

Independence from Spain
  - May Revolution: 25 May 1810
  - Declared: 9 July 1816
  - Constitution: 1 May 1853

Area
  - Total: 2,780,085 km^{2} (1,073,397 sq mi) (Note: The total area claimed is 3,669,710.7 km^{2} of which the American continental part is 2,780,084.6 km^{2} (including Tierra del Fuego Province). Area does not include territorial claims in Antarctica (873,718.4 km^{2}, including the South Orkney Islands and the South Shetland Islands) and the South Atlantic Islands (15,907.7 km^{2}, including the Falkland Islands, the South Georgia Island and the South Sandwich Islands).) (8th)
  - Water (%): 1.57

Population
  - 2025 estimate: ▲46,735,004 (33rd)
  - 2022 census: ▲46,044,703 (32nd)
  - Density: 16.8/km^{2} (43.5/sq mi) (214th)
- GDP (PPP): 2026 estimate
  - Total: ▲$1.577 trillion (30th)
  - Per capita: ▲$32,899 (68th)
- GDP (nominal): 2026 estimate
  - Total: ▲$768.206 billion (26th)
  - Per capita: ▲$16,021 (66th)
- Gini (2022): ▼40.7 medium inequality
- HDI (2023): ▲0.865 very high (47th)
- Currency: Argentine peso ($) (ARS)
- Time zone: UTC–03:00 (ART)
- Date format: dd/mm/yyyy (CE)
- Calling code: +54
- ISO 3166 code: AR
- Internet TLD: .ar

Argentina, (Note: Spanish: [aɾxenˈtina]; Guarani: Arahentína or Ayhentína; Mapudungun: Arkentina; Quechua: Arjintina; Welsh: (yr) Ariannin [(ər) arˈjanɪn].) officially the Argentine Republic, (Note: Article 35 of the Argentine Constitution gives equal recognition to the names "United Provinces of the Río de la Plata", "Argentine Republic" and "Argentine Confederation" and using "Argentine Nation" in the making and enactment of laws.) (Note: Spanish: República Argentina [reˈpuβlika aɾxenˈtina]; Guarani: Arahentína Tavakuairetã or Ayhentína Tavakuairet; Mapudungun: Arkentina ñi Repüwlika; Quechua: Arjintina Ripuwlika; Welsh: Gweriniaeth yr Ariannin [ˌɡwɛrɪˈnjaɪθ ər arˈjanɪn].) is a country in the Southern Cone of South America. It covers an area of 2,780,085 km^{2} (1,073,397 mi^{2}), making it the second-largest country in South America, after Brazil, the fourth-largest country in the Americas, and the eighth-largest country in the world. Argentina shares the bulk of the Southern Cone with Chile to the west and is bordered by Bolivia and Paraguay to the north, Brazil to the northeast, Uruguay the South Atlantic Ocean to the east, and the Drake Passage to the south. Argentina is a federal state divided into twenty-three provinces, and one autonomous city, which is the federal capital and largest city of the nation, Buenos Aires. The provinces and the capital have their own constitutions but exist under a federal system. Argentina claims sovereignty over the Falkland Islands, South Georgia and the South Sandwich Islands, the Southern Patagonian Ice Field, and a part of Antarctica.

The earliest recorded human presence dates back to the Paleolithic period. The Inca Empire expanded to the northwest of the country in pre-Columbian times. The modern country has its roots in Spanish colonisation during the 16th century. Argentina rose as the successor state of the Viceroyalty of the Río de la Plata, a Spanish overseas viceroyalty founded in 1776. The Argentine Declaration of Independence on July 9 of 1816 and the Argentine War of Independence (1810–1825) were followed by an extended civil war that lasted until 1880, culminating in reorganisation as a federation. The country thereafter enjoyed relative peace and stability, with several subsequent mass waves of millions of European immigrants (mainly Italians and Spaniards) significantly influencing its culture and demography.

The National Autonomist Party dominated national politics in the period called the Conservative Republic, from 1880 until the 1916 elections. The Great Depression led to the first coup d'état in 1930 led by José Félix Uriburu, beginning the so-called "Infamous Decade" (1930–1943). After that coup, four more followed in 1943, 1955, 1962, and 1966. Following the death of President Juan Perón in 1974, his widow and vice president, Isabel Perón, ascended to the presidency, before being overthrown in the final coup in 1976. The following military junta persecuted and murdered thousands of political critics, activists, and leftists in the Dirty War, a period of state terrorism and civil unrest that lasted until the election of Raúl Alfonsín as president in 1983.

Argentina is a regional power and retains its historic status as a middle power in international affairs. A major non-NATO ally of the United States, Argentina is a developing country with the second-highest human development index in Latin America after Chile. Its economy is the second-largest in South America, and it is a member of G-15 and G20. Argentina is also a founding member of the United Nations, World Bank, World Trade Organization, Mercosur, Community of Latin American and Caribbean States and the Organization of Ibero-American States.

== Etymology ==
The description of the region by the word Argentina has been found on a Venetian map in 1536. The name derives from the Latin word argentum, meaning "silver". Early 16th century explorers around the Río de la Plata Basin became aware of the abundance of silver in the region.

The name was probably first given by Venetian and Genoese navigators, such as Giovanni Caboto. In Spanish and Portuguese, the words for 'silver' are respectively plata and prata and '(made) of silver' is plateado and prateado, although argento for 'silver' and argentado for 'covered in silver' exist in Spanish. Argentina was first associated with the silver mountains legend, widespread among the first European explorers of the basin.

The first written use of the name in Spanish can be traced to La Argentina, (Note: The poem's full name is La Argentina y conquista del Río de la Plata, con otros acaecimientos de los reinos del Perú, Tucumán y estado del Brasil.) a 1602 poem by Martín del Barco Centenera describing the region. Although "Argentina" was already in common usage by the 18th century, the country was formally named "Viceroyalty of the Río de la Plata" by the Spanish Empire, and "United Provinces of the Río de la Plata" after independence.

The 1826 constitution included the first use of the name "Argentine Republic" in legal documents. The name "Argentine Confederation" was also commonly used and is formalised in the Argentine Constitution of 1853. In 1860 a presidential decree settled the name as "Argentine Republic", and that year's constitutional amendment ruled all the names since 1810 as legally valid. (Note: Also stated in article 35 of all subsequent amendments: 1866, 1898, 1949, 1957, 1972 and 1994 (current))

In English, the country was traditionally called "the Argentine".

== History ==
=== Pre-Columbian era ===
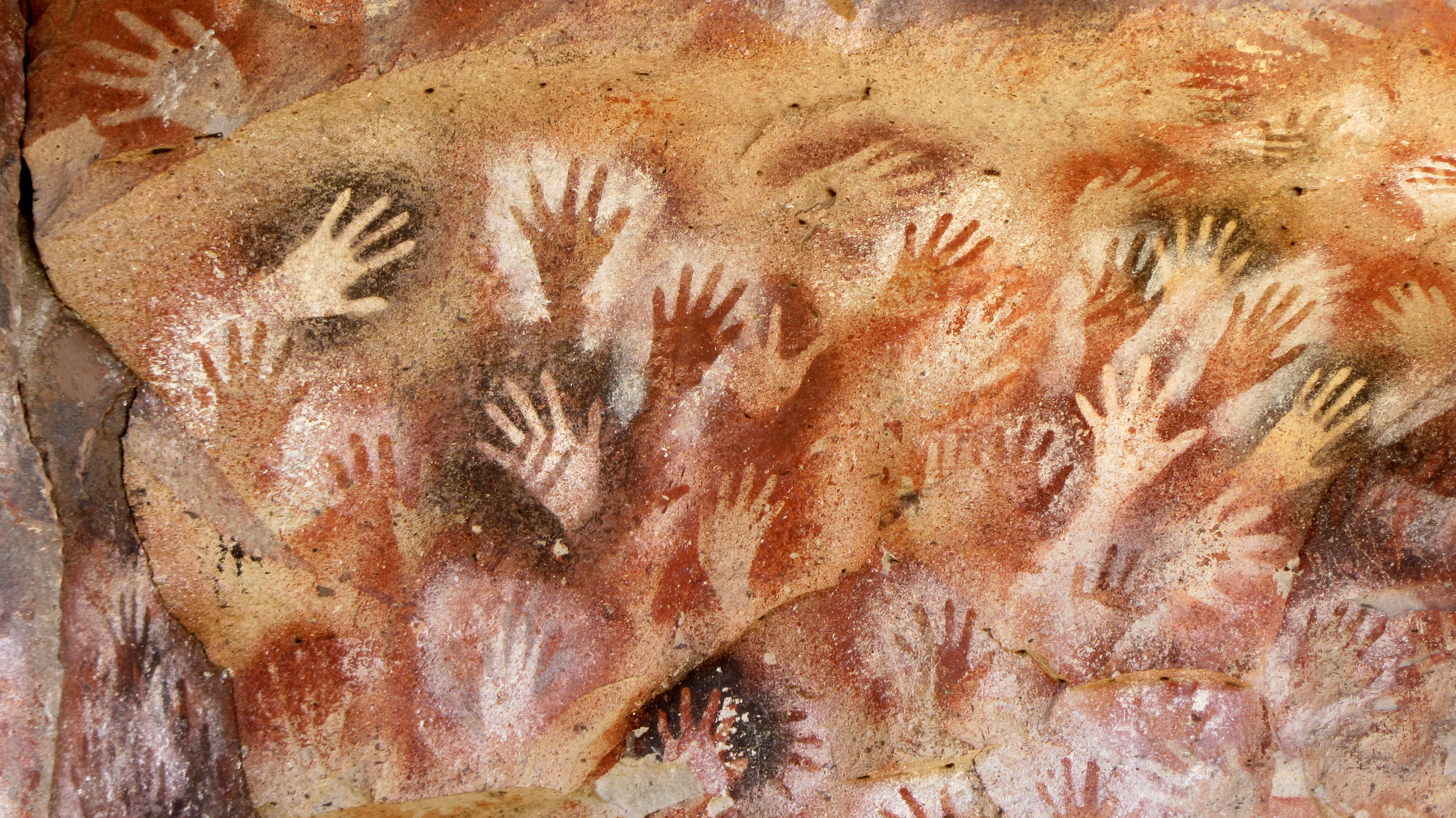
The Cave of the Hands in Santa Cruz province

Evidence suggests that humans inhabited the region as early as 21,000 years ago. In 2015, fossilised bones of a large, extinct armoured mammal called Neosclerocalyptus were unearthed near Buenos Aires. These bones bore cut marks indicative of butchering with stone tools, implying human activity during the Last Glacial Maximum. Further south, the Piedra Museo site in Santa Cruz Province has yielded human remains and artifacts dating back approximately 11,000 years. Discoveries at this site include spearheads associated with extinct megafauna such as Mylodon and Hippidion, highlighting the advanced hunting practices of early inhabitants. Another significant site is the Cueva de las Manos (Cave of the Hands), also located in Santa Cruz, which features stencilled handprints and hunting scenes created between 7,300 BC and 700 AD, offering insights into the lives of early hunter-gatherer communities.

Until the period of European colonisation, Argentina was relatively sparsely populated by a wide number of diverse cultures with different social organisations, which can be divided into three main groups. The first group were basic hunters and food gatherers without the development of pottery, such as the Selkʼnam and Yahgan in the extreme south. The second group were advanced hunters and food gatherers, who included the Puelche, Querandí and Serranos in the centre-east; and the Tehuelche in the south, all of them conquered by the Mapuche spreading from Chile, and the Qom and Wichi in the north. The last group were farmers with pottery, such as the Charrúa, Minuane and Guaraní in the northeast, with slash-and-burn semisedentary existence; the advanced Diaguita sedentary trading culture in the northwest, which was conquered by the Inca Empire around 1480; the Tonocoté and Hênîa and Kâmîare in the country's centre, and the Huarpe in the centre-west, a culture that raised llama cattle and was strongly influenced by the Incas.

=== Colonial era ===
The surrender of Beresford to Santiago de Liniers during the British invasions of the Río de la Plata

Europeans first arrived in the region with the 1502 voyage of Amerigo Vespucci. Spanish navigators Juan Díaz de Solís and Sebastian Cabot visited the territory in 1516 and 1526, respectively. In 1536 Pedro de Mendoza founded the small settlement of Buenos Aires, which was abandoned in 1541.

Further colonisation efforts came from Paraguay—establishing the Governorate of the Río de la Plata—Peru and Chile. Francisco de Aguirre founded Santiago del Estero in 1553. Londres was founded in 1558; Mendoza, in 1561; San Juan, in 1562; San Miguel de Tucumán, in 1565. Juan de Garay founded Santa Fe in 1573 and the same year Jerónimo Luis de Cabrera set up Córdoba. Garay went further south to re-found Buenos Aires in 1580. San Luis was established in 1596.

The Spanish Empire subordinated the economic potential of the Argentine territory to the immediate wealth of the silver and gold mines in Bolivia and Peru, and as such it became part of the Viceroyalty of Peru until the creation of the Viceroyalty of the Río de la Plata in 1776 with Buenos Aires as its capital.

Buenos Aires repelled two unsuccessful British invasions in 1806 and 1807. The ideas of the Age of Enlightenment and the example of the first Atlantic Revolutions generated criticism of the absolutist monarchy that ruled the country. As in the rest of Spanish America, the overthrow of Ferdinand VII during the Peninsular War created great concern.

=== Independence and civil wars ===
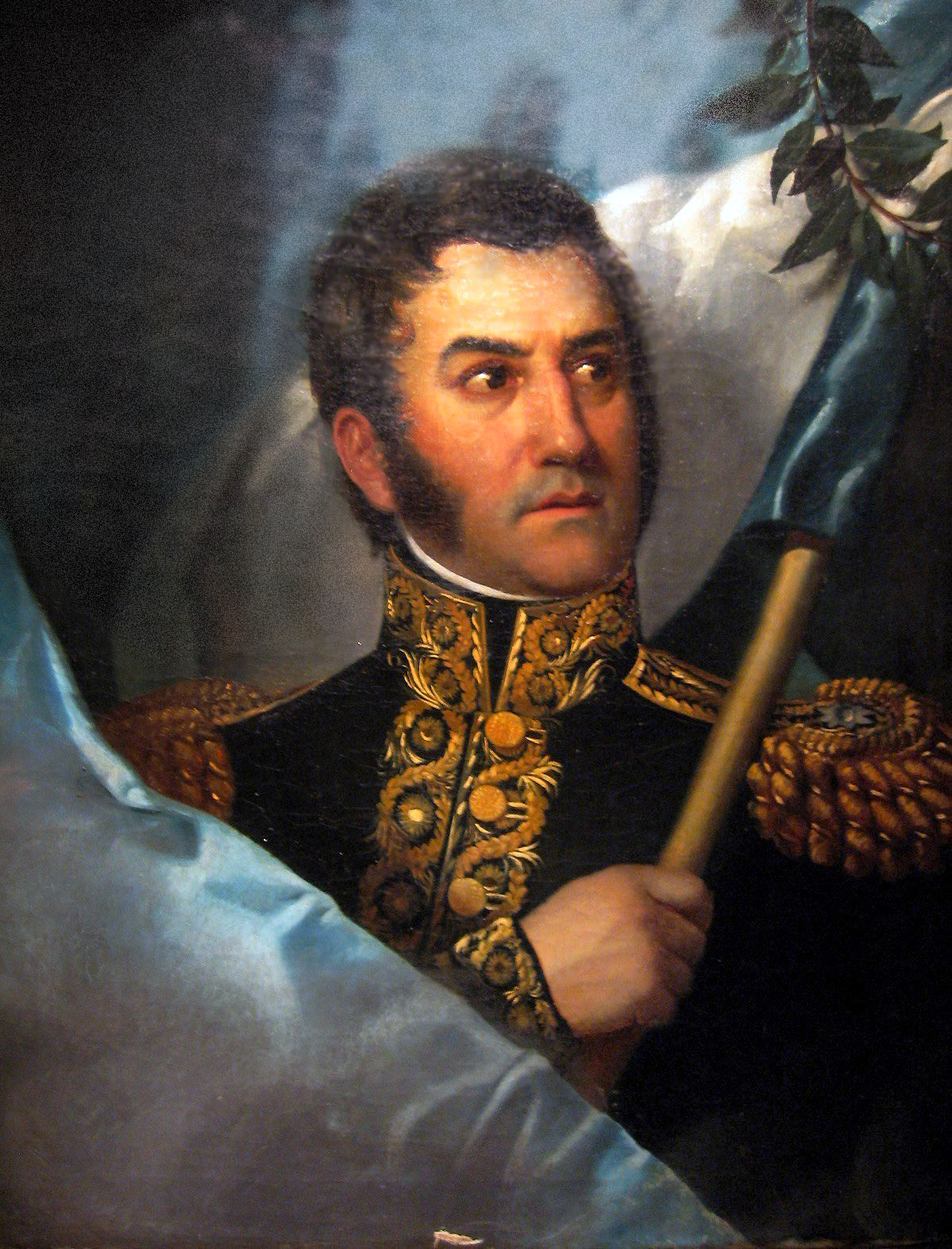
General José de San Martín, Libertador of Argentina, Chile and Peru

Beginning a process from which Argentina was to emerge as successor state to the viceroyalty, the 1810 May Revolution replaced Viceroy Baltasar Hidalgo de Cisneros with the First Junta, a new government in Buenos Aires made up from locals. In the first clashes of the Independence War, the junta crushed a royalist counter-revolution in Córdoba but failed to overcome those of the Banda Oriental, Upper Peru, and Paraguay, which later became independent states.

The French-Argentine Hippolyte Bouchard then brought his fleet to wage war against Spain overseas and attacked Spanish California, Spanish Peru and Spanish Philippines. He secured the allegiance of escaped Filipinos in San Blas who defected from the Spanish to join the Argentine navy, due to common Argentine and Philippine grievances against Spanish colonisation. Jose de San Martin's brother, Juan Fermín de San Martín, was already in the Philippines and drumming up revolutionary fervour prior to this.

Revolutionaries split into two antagonist groups: the Centralists and the Federalists—a move that would define Argentina's first decades of independence. The Assembly of the Year XIII appointed Gervasio Antonio de Posadas as the first Supreme Director.

On 9 July 1816, the Congress of Tucumán formalised the Declaration of Independence, which is now celebrated as Independence Day. One year later General Martín Miguel de Güemes stopped royalists on the north. General José de San Martín joined Bernardo O'Higgins, and they led a combined army across the Andes and secured the independence of Chile; then it was sent by O'Higgins orders to the Spanish stronghold of Lima and proclaimed the independence of Peru. (Note: San Martín's military campaigns, together with those of Simón Bolívar in Gran Colombia, are collectively known as the Spanish American wars of independence.) In 1819 Buenos Aires enacted a centralist constitution that was soon abrogated by federalists.

Some of the most important figures of Argentine independence made a proposal known as the Inca plan of 1816, which proposed that the United Provinces of the Río de la Plata (modern-day Argentina) should be a monarchy, led by a descendant of the Inca. Juan Bautista Túpac Amaru (half-brother of Túpac Amaru II) was proposed as monarch. Some examples of those who supported this proposal were Manuel Belgrano, José de San Martín and Martín Miguel de Güemes. The Congress of Tucumán ultimately rejected the Inca plan, creating instead a republican, centralist state.

The 1820 Battle of Cepeda, between the Centralists and the Federalists, resulted in the end of the Supreme Director rule. In 1826 Buenos Aires enacted another centralist constitution, with Bernardino Rivadavia appointed as the first president of the country. The interior provinces soon rose against him, forced his resignation and discarded the constitution. Centralists and Federalists resumed the civil war; the latter prevailed and formed the Argentine Confederation in 1831, led by Juan Manuel de Rosas. During his regime he faced a French blockade (1838–1840), the War of the Confederation (1836–1839), and an Anglo-French blockade (1845–1850), but remained undefeated and prevented further loss of national territory. His trade restriction policies angered the interior provinces and in 1852 Justo José de Urquiza, another powerful caudillo, beat him out of power. As president of the Confederation, Urquiza enacted the liberal and federal 1853 Constitution. Buenos Aires seceded but was forced back into the Confederation after being defeated in the 1859 Battle of Cepeda.

=== Rise of the modern nation ===
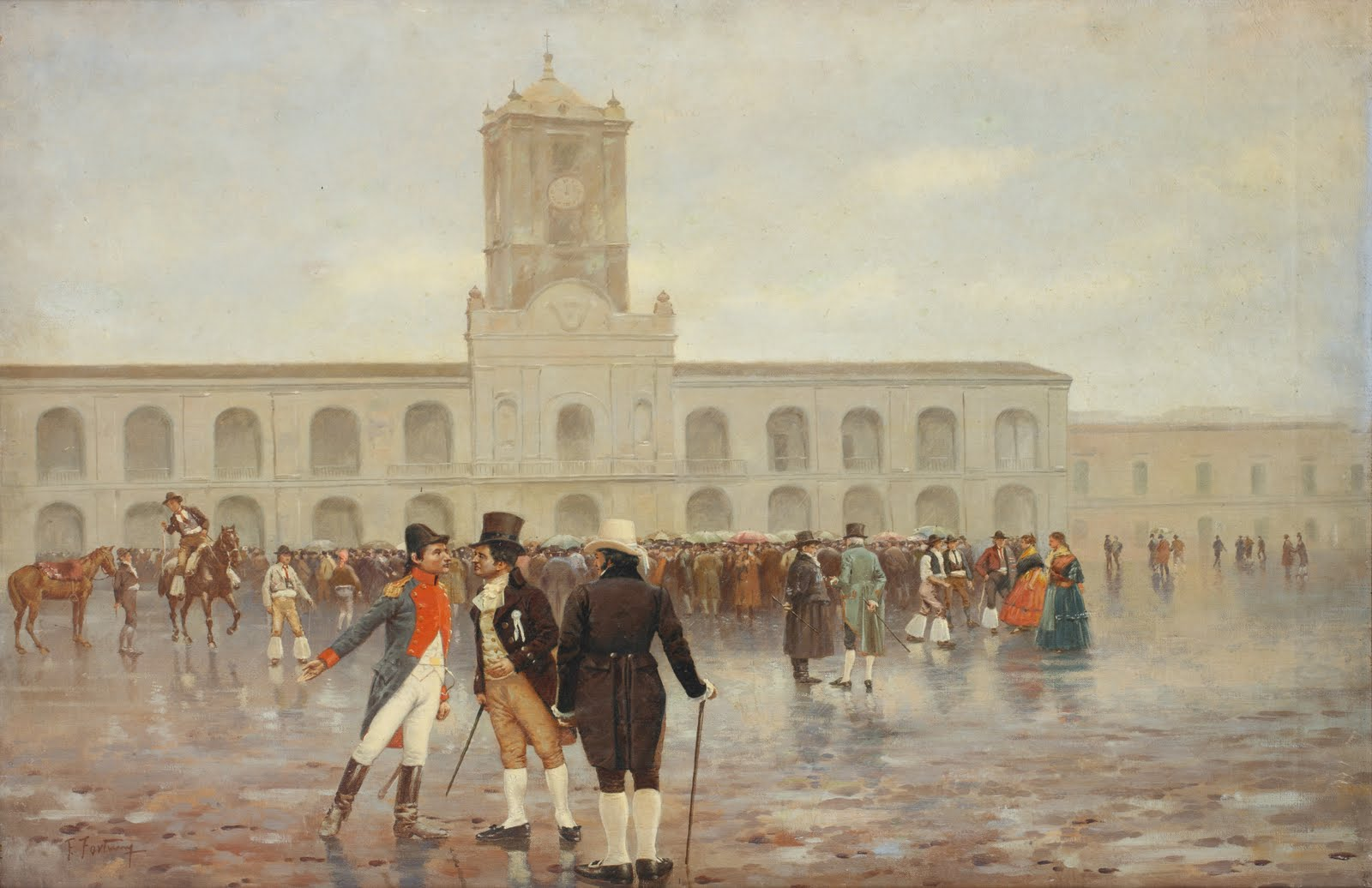
People gathered in front of the Buenos Aires Cabildo during the May Revolution

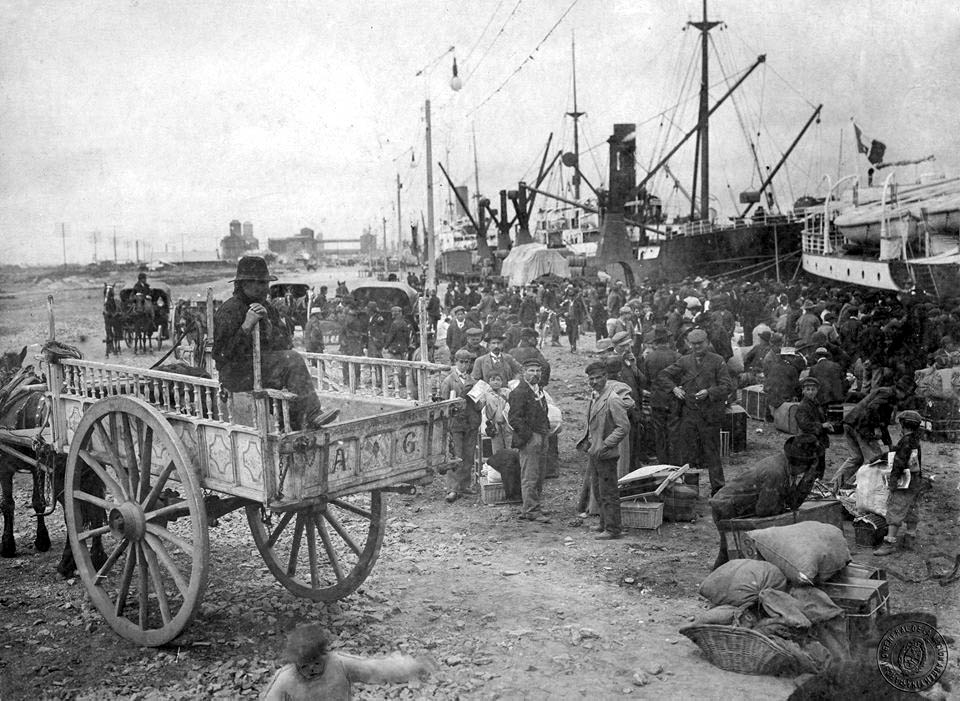
Immigrants from Italy arriving in Buenos Aires, during the great European immigration wave to Argentina

Overpowering Urquiza in the 1861 Battle of Pavón, Bartolomé Mitre secured Buenos Aires' predominance and was elected as the first president of the reunified country. He was followed by Domingo Faustino Sarmiento and Nicolás Avellaneda; these three presidencies set up the basis of the modern Argentine state.

Starting with Julio Argentino Roca in 1880, ten consecutive federal governments emphasised liberal economic policies. The massive wave of European immigration they promoted—second only to the United States'—led to a near-reinvention of Argentine society and economy that by 1908 had placed the country as the seventh wealthiest developed nation in the world. Driven by this immigration wave and decreasing mortality, the population grew fivefold and the economy 15-fold: from 1870 to 1910, wheat exports went from 100,000 to 2,500,000 t (110,000 to 2,760,000 short tons) per year, while frozen beef exports increased from 25,000 to 365,000 t (28,000 to 402,000 short tons) per year, placing Argentina as one of the world's top five exporters.

Its railway mileage rose from 503 to 31,104 km (313 to 19,327 mi). Fostered by a new public, compulsory, free and secular education system, literacy quickly increased from 22% to 65%, a level higher than most Latin American nations would reach fifty years later. Real GDP grew so fast that despite the huge immigration influx, per capita income between 1862 and 1920 went from 67% of developed country levels, to 100%:

In 1865, Argentina was one of the top 25 nations by per capita income. By 1908, it reached 7th place. Per capita income was 70% higher than Italy's, 90% higher than Spain's, 180% higher than Japan's and 400% higher than Brazil's. Despite these unique achievements, the country was slow to meet its original goals of industrialisation: after the steep development of capital-intensive local industries in the 1920s, a significant part of the manufacturing sector remained labour-intensive in the 1930s.

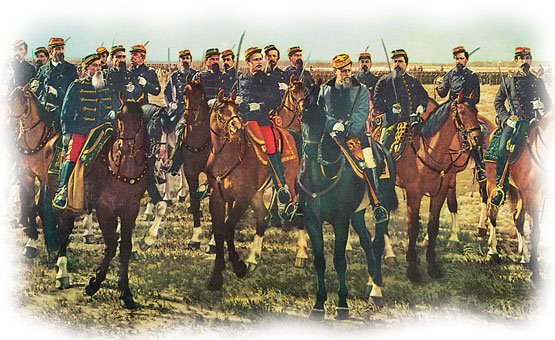
Conquest of the Desert, by Juan Manuel Blanes (fragment showing Julio Argentino Roca, at the front, a major figure of the Generation of '80)

Between 1878 and 1884, the so-called Conquest of the Desert occurred, with the purpose of tripling the Argentine territory by means of the constant confrontations between natives and Criollos in the border, and the appropriation of the indigenous territories. The first conquest consisted of a series of military incursions into the Pampa and Patagonian territories dominated by the indigenous peoples, distributing them among the members of the Sociedad Rural Argentina, financiers of the expeditions.

The conquest of Chaco lasted up to the end of the century, since its full ownership of the national economic system only took place when the mere extraction of wood and tannin was replaced by the production of cotton. The Argentine government considered indigenous people as inferior beings, without the same rights as Criollos and Europeans.

In 1912, President Roque Sáenz Peña enacted universal and secret male suffrage, which allowed Hipólito Yrigoyen, leader of the Radical Civic Union (or UCR), to win the 1916 election. He enacted social and economic reforms and extended assistance to small farms and businesses. Argentina stayed neutral during World War I. The second administration of Yrigoyen faced an economic crisis, precipitated by the Great Depression.

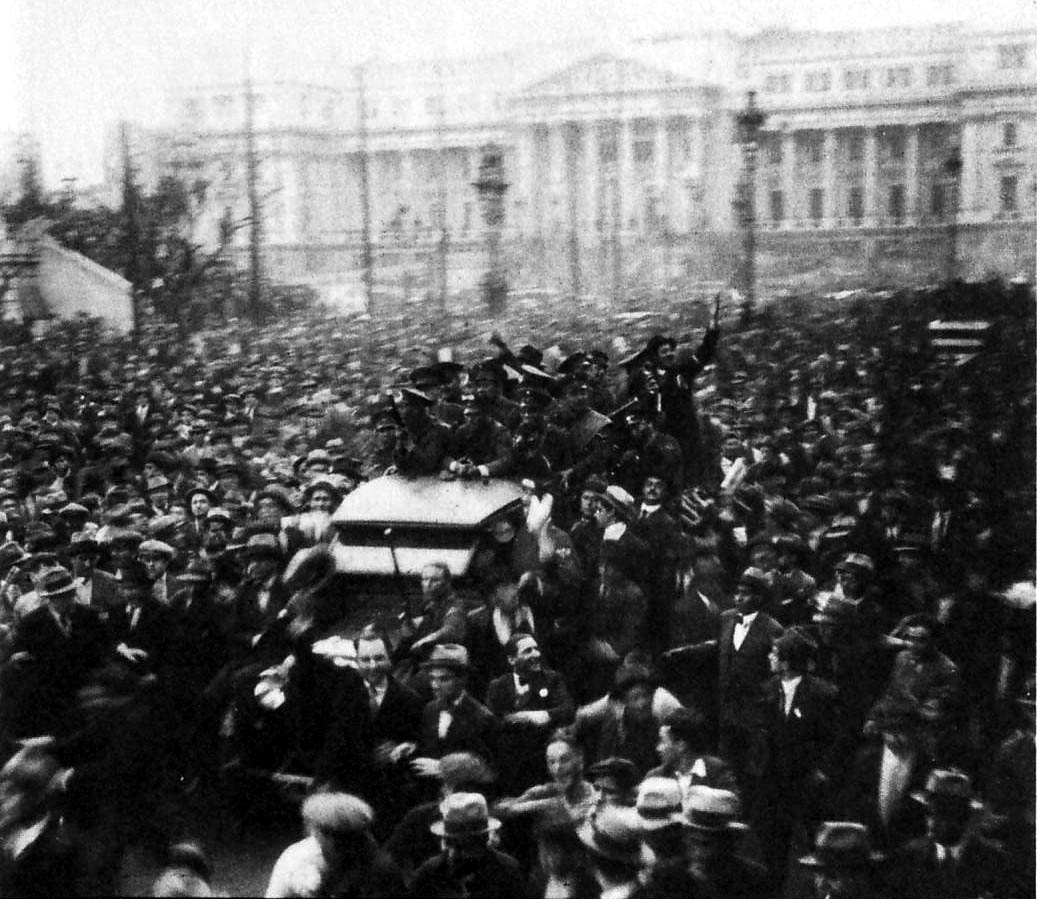
Crowds outside the Argentine National Congress during the 1930 Argentine coup d'état which marked the start of the Infamous Decade

In 1930, Yrigoyen was ousted from power by the military led by José Félix Uriburu. Although Argentina remained among the fifteen richest countries until mid-century, this coup d'état marked the start of the steady economic and social decline that pushed the country back into underdevelopment.

Uriburu ruled for two years; then Agustín Pedro Justo was elected in a fraudulent election and signed a controversial treaty with the United Kingdom. Argentina stayed neutral during World War II, a decision that had full British support but was rejected by the United States after the attack on Pearl Harbor. In 1943 a military coup d'état led by General Arturo Rawson toppled the constitutional government of Ramón Castillo. Under pressure from the United States, Argentina declared war on the Axis powers on 27 March 1945, roughly a month before the end of World War II in Europe.

During the Rawson dictatorship a relatively unknown military colonel named Juan Perón was named head of the Labour Department. Perón quickly managed to climb the political ladder, being named defence minister in 1944. Being perceived as a political threat by rivals in the military and the conservative camp, he was forced to resign in 1945 and was arrested days later. He was finally released under mounting pressure from both his base and several allied unions. He later became president after a landslide victory over the UCR in the 1946 general election as the Labour Party candidate.

=== Peron ===
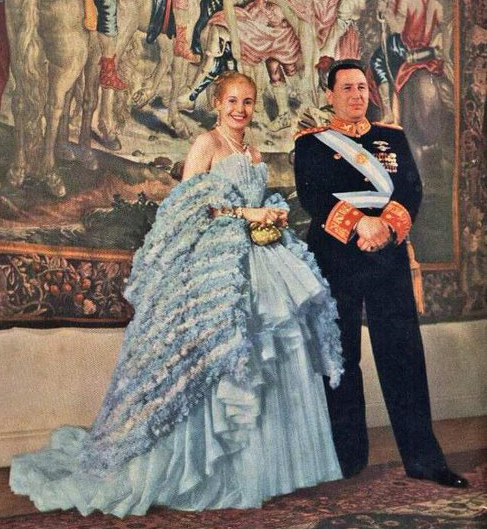
Juan Perón and his wife Eva Perón, 1947

In 1946, the Labour Party—later renamed Justicialist Party and also known as the Peronist Party, the most powerful and influential party in Argentine history—came into power with the rise of Perón to the presidency. He nationalised strategic industries and services, improved wages and working conditions, paid the full external debt and claimed he achieved nearly full employment. He pushed Congress to enact women's suffrage in 1947 and developed a system of social assistance for the most vulnerable sectors of society. The economy began to decline in 1950 due in part to government expenditures and the protectionist economic policies.

He also engaged in a campaign of political suppression. Anyone who was perceived to be a political dissident or potential rival was subject to threats, physical violence and harassment. The Argentine intelligentsia, the middle-class, university students, and professors were seen as particularly troublesome. Perón fired over 2,000 university professors and faculty members from all major public education institutions.

Perón tried to bring most trade and labour unions under his thumb, regularly resorting to violence when needed. For instance, the meat-packers union leader, Cipriano Reyes, organised strikes in protest against the government after elected labour movement officials were forcefully replaced by Peronist puppets from the Justicialist Party. Reyes was arrested on charges of terrorism, though the allegations were never substantiated. Reyes, who was never formally charged, was tortured in prison for five years and only released after the regime's downfall in 1955.

Perón was reelected in 1951. His wife Eva Perón, who played a critical role in the party, died of cancer in 1952. As the economy continued to tank, Perón started losing popular support and came to be seen as a threat to the national process. The Navy took advantage of Perón's withering political power and bombed the Plaza de Mayo in 1955 in a coup attempt. Perón survived the attack, but a few months later, during the Liberating Revolution coup, he was deposed and went into exile in Spain.

=== Revolución Libertadora ===
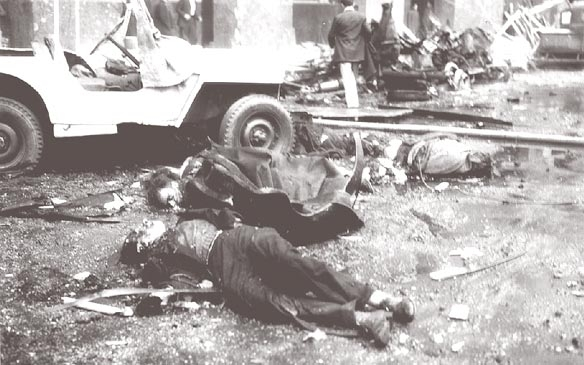
Civilian casualties after the air attack and massacre on Plaza de Mayo, June 1955

The new head of state, Pedro Eugenio Aramburu, proscribed Peronism and banned the party from any future elections. Arturo Frondizi from the UCR won the 1958 general election. He encouraged investment to achieve energetic and industrial self-sufficiency, reversed a chronic trade deficit and lifted the ban on Peronism; yet his efforts to stay on good terms with both the Peronists and the military earned him the rejection of both, and a coup forced him out. Amidst the political turmoil, Senate leader José María Guido reacted swiftly and applied anti-power vacuum legislation, ascending to the presidency himself; elections were repealed and Peronism was prohibited once again. Elected in 1963, Arturo Illia presided over a period of broad economic expansion until his 1966 ousting by a military coup led by General Juan Carlos Onganía. This Argentine Revolution established a long-term military dictatorship intended to rule indefinitely.

=== National Reorganization Process ===
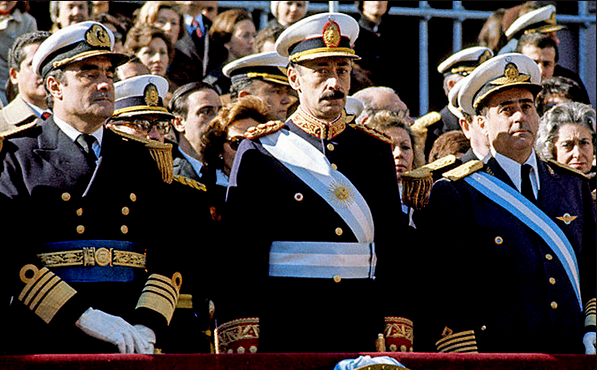
The "first military junta" – Admiral Emilio Massera, Lieutenant General Jorge Videla and Brigadier General Orlando Agosti (from left to right) – observing the Independence Day military parade on Avenida del Libertador, 9 July 1978

The "Dirty War" (Spanish: Guerra Sucia) was part of Operation Condor, which included the participation of other right-wing dictatorships in the Southern Cone. The Dirty War involved state terrorism in Argentina and elsewhere in the Southern Cone against political dissidents, with military and security forces employing urban and rural violence against left-wing guerrillas, political dissidents, and anyone believed to be associated with socialism or somehow contrary to the neoliberal economic policies of the regime. Victims of the violence in Argentina alone included an estimated 15,000 to 30,000 left-wing activists and militants, including trade unionists, students, journalists, Marxists, Peronist guerrillas, and alleged sympathisers. Most of the victims were casualties of state terrorism. The opposing guerrillas' victims numbered nearly 500–540 military and police officials and up to 230 civilians. Argentina received technical support and military aid from the United States government during the Johnson, Nixon, Ford, Carter, and Reagan administrations.

Onganía shut down Congress, banned all political parties, and dismantled student and worker unions. In 1969, popular discontent led to two massive protests: the Cordobazo and the Rosariazo. The terrorist guerrilla organisation Montoneros kidnapped and executed Aramburu in June 1970. Following several years of military rule, Alejandro Agustín Lanusse was appointed president by the military junta in 1971. Under increasing political pressure for the return of democracy, Lanusse called for elections in 1973. Perón was banned from running, but the Peronist Party was allowed to participate. Perón's surrogate candidate Hector Cámpora won the March 1973 election. He issued pardons for condemned guerrilla members and then secured Perón's return from his exile in Spain.

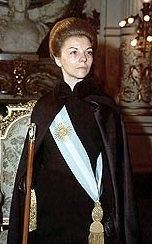
Isabel Perón taking office as President of Argentina, 1974

On the day Perón returned to Argentina, the clash between Peronist internal factions—right-wing union leaders and left-wing youth from the Montoneros far-left revolutionary guerrilla organization—resulted in the Ezeiza massacre. Cámpora's months-long tenure in government was beset by political and social unrest. Over 600 social conflicts, strikes, and factory occupations took place within a single month. Even though far-left terrorist organisations had suspended their armed struggle, their joining the participatory democracy process was interpreted as a direct threat by the Peronist right-wing faction.

Overwhelmed by political violence, Cámpora resigned, and Perón won the following September 1973 election with his third wife Isabel as vice-president. He expelled Montoneros from the party, and they became once again a clandestine organisation. José López Rega organised the Argentine Anticommunist Alliance to fight against them and the People's Revolutionary Army (ERP). Perón died in July 1974 and was succeeded by his wife, who signed a secret decree empowering the military and the police to "annihilate" the left-wing subversion, stopping ERP's attempt to start a rural insurgence in Tucumán province. Her short presidency was marked by the collapse of Argentine political and social systems, leading to a constitutional crisis that paved the way for a decade of instability, left-wing terrorist guerrilla attacks, and state-sponsored terrorism. Isabel Perón was ousted in 1976 by a junta of the combined armed forces, led by army general Jorge Rafael Videla. They initiated the National Reorganization Process, often shortened to Proceso.

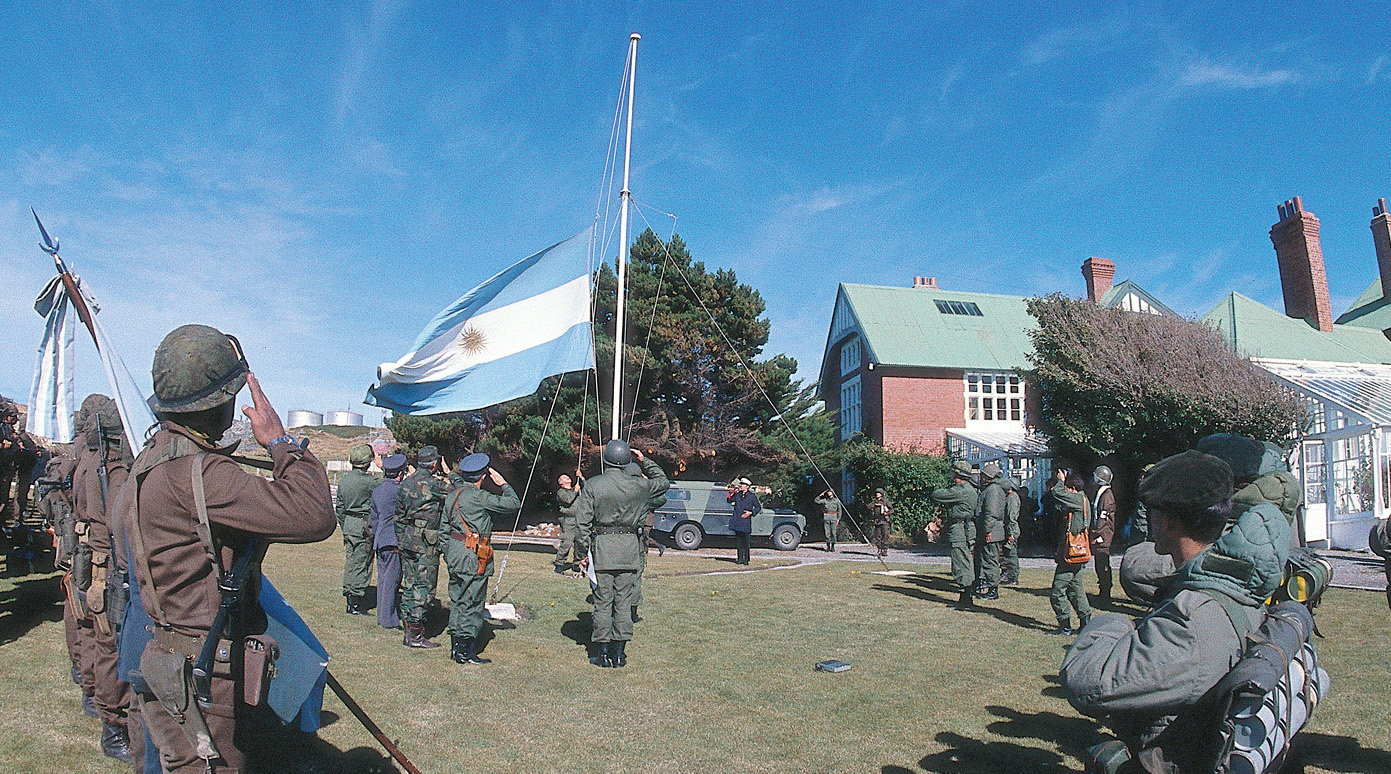
Raising of the Argentine flag after Operation Rosario

The Proceso shut down Congress, removed the judges on the Supreme Court, banned political parties and unions, and resorted to employing the forced disappearance of suspected guerrilla members including individuals suspected of being associated with the left-wing. By the end of 1976, the Montoneros had lost nearly 2,000 members, and by 1977 the ERP was completely subdued. The severely weakened Montoneros launched a counterattack in 1979, which was quickly put down, effectively ending the guerrilla threat and securing the junta's position in power.

In March 1982, an Argentine force took control of the British territory of South Georgia, and on 2 April Argentina invaded the Falkland Islands (called as Islas Malvinas by Argentina). The United Kingdom dispatched a task force to regain possession. Argentine forces surrendered on 14 June. Street riots in Buenos Aires followed the humiliating defeat, and the military leadership stood down. Reynaldo Bignone replaced President Leopoldo Galtieri and began to organise the transition to democratic governance.

=== Return to democracy ===
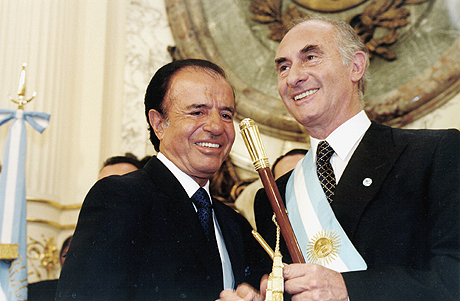
Menem (left) with Fernando de la Rúa on 10 December 1999 just after the latter became president

Raúl Alfonsín won the 1983 elections campaigning for the prosecution of those responsible for human rights violations during the Proceso: the Trial of the Juntas and other martial courts sentenced all the coup's leaders, but under military pressure, he also enacted the Full Stop and Due Obedience laws, which halted prosecutions further down the chain of command. The worsening economic crisis and hyperinflation reduced his popular support, and the Peronist Carlos Menem won the 1989 election. Riots in July forced Alfonsín transfer power to Menem, five months earlier than scheduled.

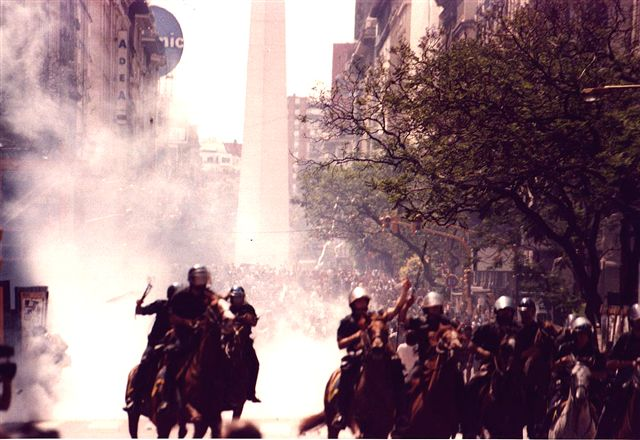
Civil unrest on Plaza de Mayo during the Argentinazo riots, which forced De La Rúa to resign on 21 December 2001

Menem embraced and enacted neoliberal policies: a fixed exchange rate, business deregulation, privatisations, and the dismantling of protectionist barriers normalised the economy in the short term. He pardoned the officers who had been sentenced during Alfonsín's government. The 1994 Constitutional Amendment allowed Menem to be elected for a second term. Days after the constitutional amendment was ratified, Menem issued a decree abolishing conscription following months of social backlash over the murder of Omar Carrasco in Neuquén Province. With the economy beginning to decline in 1995, and with increasing unemployment and recession, the UCR, led by Fernando de la Rúa, returned to the presidency in the 1999 elections.

De la Rúa left Menem's economic plan in effect despite the worsening crisis, which led to growing social discontent. Massive capital flight from the country was responded to with a freezing of bank accounts, generating further turmoil. The December 2001 riots forced him to resign. Congress appointed Eduardo Duhalde as acting president, who revoked the fixed exchange rate established by Menem, causing many working- and middle-class Argentines to lose a significant portion of their savings. By late 2002, the economic crisis began to recede, but the assassination of two piqueteros by the police caused political unrest, prompting Duhalde to move elections forward. Néstor Kirchner was elected president in the 2003 election.

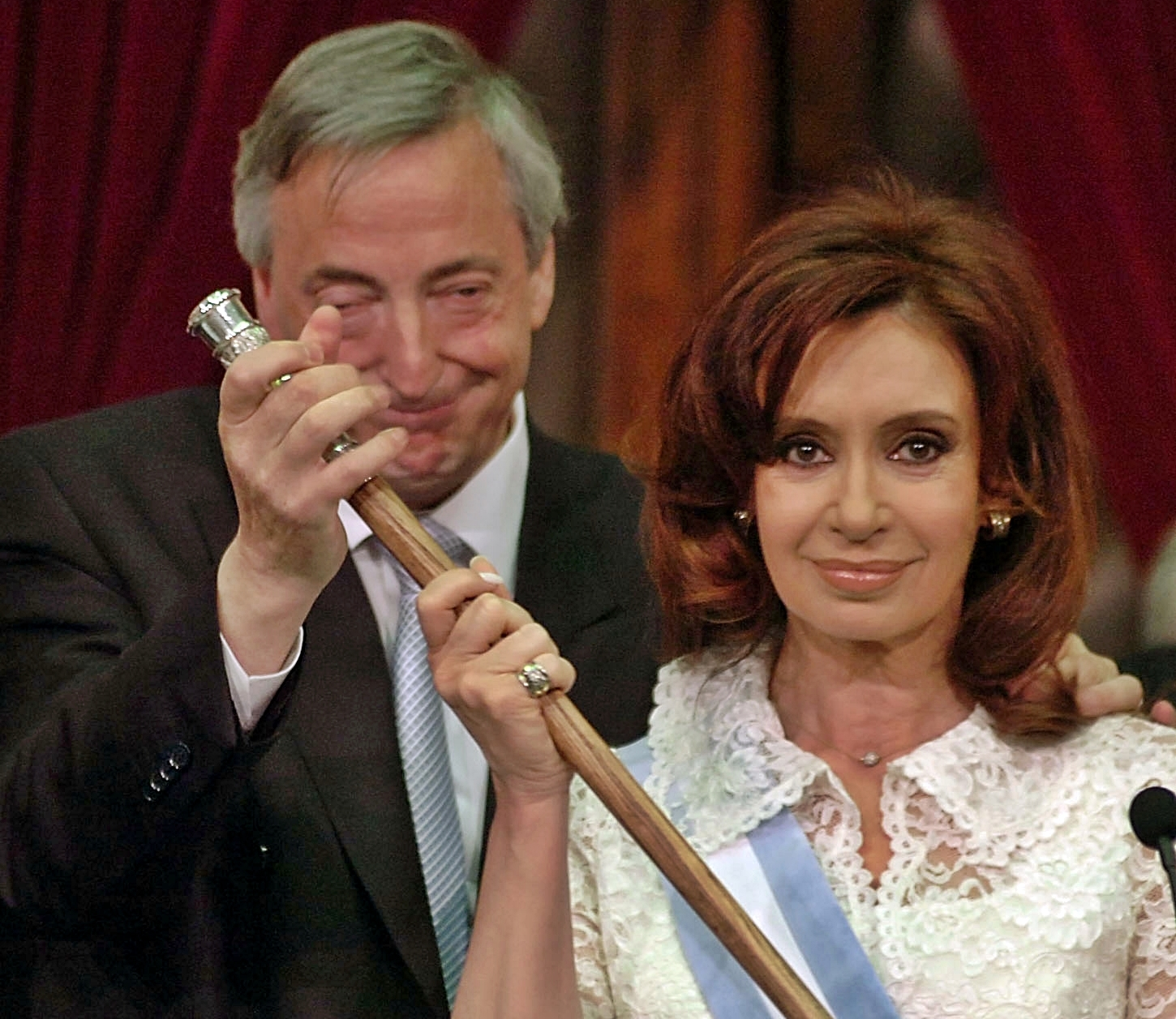
Kirchner and his wife Cristina Kirchner just after her presidency began, 10 December 2007

Boosting the neo-Keynesian economic policies laid by Duhalde, Kirchner ended the economic crisis, attaining significant fiscal and trade surpluses and rapid GDP growth. Under his administration, Argentina restructured its defaulted debt with an unprecedented discount of about 70% on most bonds, paid off debts with the International Monetary Fund, purged the military of officers with dubious human rights records, voided the Full Stop and Due Obedience laws, (Note: The Full Stop and Due Obedience laws had been abrogated by Congress in 1998.) and resumed legal prosecution of the Junta's crimes. He did not run for reelection, promoting instead the candidacy of his wife, Senator Cristina Kirchner who won the 2007 and 2011 elections. During Kirchner's presidency she promoted foreign relations with countries such as Venezuela, Iran, and Cuba, whilst US and UK relations were increasingly strained. Despite increased renewable energy production and subsidies during her tenure, the overall economy had been sluggish since 2011.

In 2015, after a tie in the first round of presidential elections on 25 October, centre-right coalition candidate Mauricio Macri won the first ballotage in Argentina's history, beating Front for Victory candidate Daniel Scioli and becoming president-elect. Macri was the first democratically elected non-Peronist president since 1916 that managed to complete his term in office without being overthrown. He inherited an economy with a high inflation rate and in poor shape. In April 2016, the Macri government introduced neoliberal austerity measures intended to tackle inflation and overblown public deficits. Under Macri's administration, economic recovery remained elusive with GDP shrinking 3.4%, inflation totalling 240%, billions of US dollars issued in sovereign debt, and mass poverty increasing by the end of his term. He ran for reelection in 2019 but lost by nearly eight percentage points to Alberto Fernández, the Justicialist Party candidate.

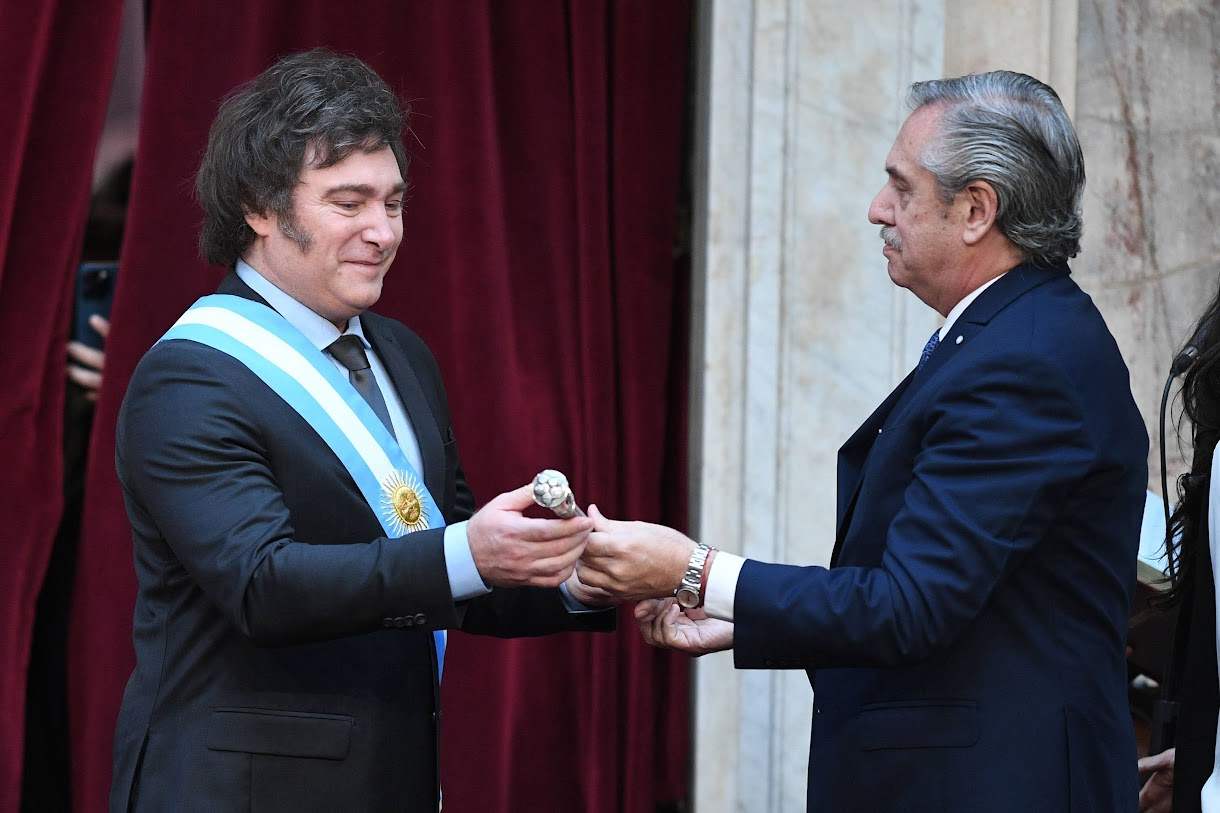
Javier Milei receiving the presidency from Fernández on 10 December 2023

Fernández and Vice President Cristina Kirchner took office in December 2019, just months before the COVID-19 pandemic hit Argentina and among accusations of corruption, bribery and misuse of public funds during Néstor and Cristina Kirchner's presidencies. In the 2021 legislative election, the centre-left coalition of the ruling Peronist party, Frente de Todos, lost its majority in Congress for the first time in almost 40 years. The election victory of the centre-right coalition, Juntos por el Cambio, limited Fernández' power during his final two years in office. Losing control of the Senate made it difficult for him to make key appointments, including to the judiciary. It also forced him to negotiate with the opposition on every initiative sent to the legislature.

In April 2023, Fernández announced that he would not seek reelection in the 2023 presidential election. The election run-off ended in a win for Libertarian Party Javier Milei with 55.7% of the vote against 44.4% to ruling coalition candidate Sergio Massa. Milei's presidency began on 10 December 2023. In October 2025, Milei's party, La Libertad Avanza, won a landslide victory in midterm elections, making it easier for Milei to push ahead with his programme of radical spending cuts and free-market reforms.

== Geography ==
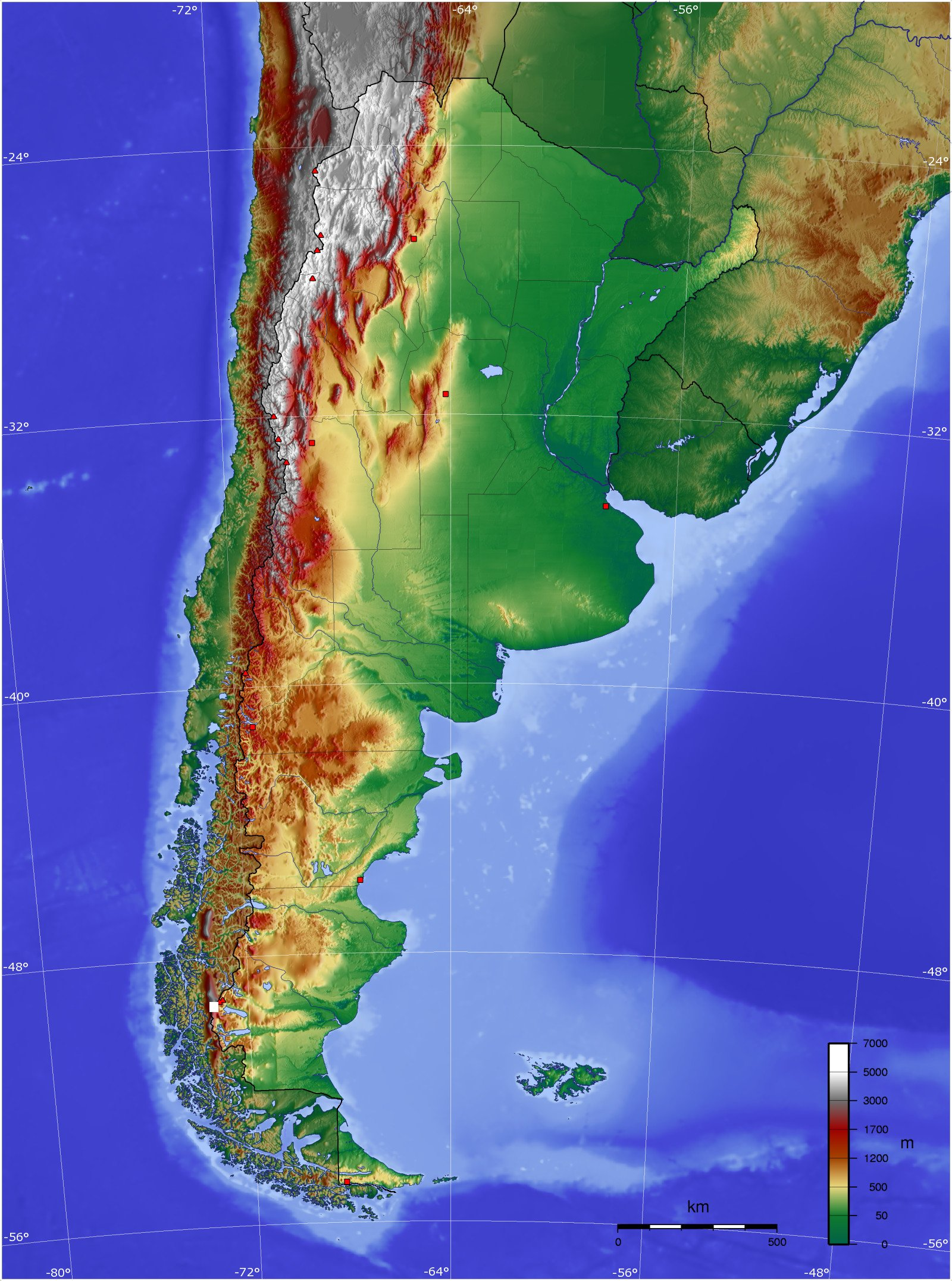
A topographic map of Argentina

With a mainland surface area of 2,780,400 km^{2} (1,073,518 sq mi), Argentina is located in southern South America, sharing land borders with Chile across the Andes to the west; Bolivia and Paraguay to the north; Brazil to the northeast, Uruguay and the South Atlantic Ocean to the east; and the Drake Passage to the south; for an overall land border length of 9,376 km (5,826 mi). Its coastal border over the Río de la Plata and South Atlantic Ocean is 5,117 km (3,180 mi) long.

The highest point is Aconcagua in the Mendoza province (6,959 m (22,831 ft) above sea level), also the highest point in the Southern and Western Hemispheres. The lowest point is Laguna del Carbón in the San Julián Great Depression Santa Cruz province (−105 m (−344 ft) below sea level, also the lowest point in the Southern and Western Hemispheres, as well as the seventh lowest point on Earth).

The northernmost point is at the confluence of the Grande de San Juan and Mojinete rivers in Jujuy province; the southernmost is Cape San Pío in Tierra del Fuego province; the easternmost is northeast of Bernardo de Irigoyen, Misiones and the westernmost is within Los Glaciares National Park in Santa Cruz province. The maximum north–south distance is 3,694 km (2,295 mi), while the maximum east–west one is 1,423 km (884 mi).

Some of the major rivers are the Paraná, Uruguay—which join to form the Río de la Plata—Paraguay, Salado, Negro, Santa Cruz, Pilcomayo, Bermejo and Colorado. These rivers are discharged into the Argentine Sea, the shallow area of the Atlantic Ocean over the Patagonian Shelf, an unusually wide continental platform. Its waters are influenced by two major ocean currents: the warm Brazil Current and the cold Falkland Current.

=== Biodiversity ===
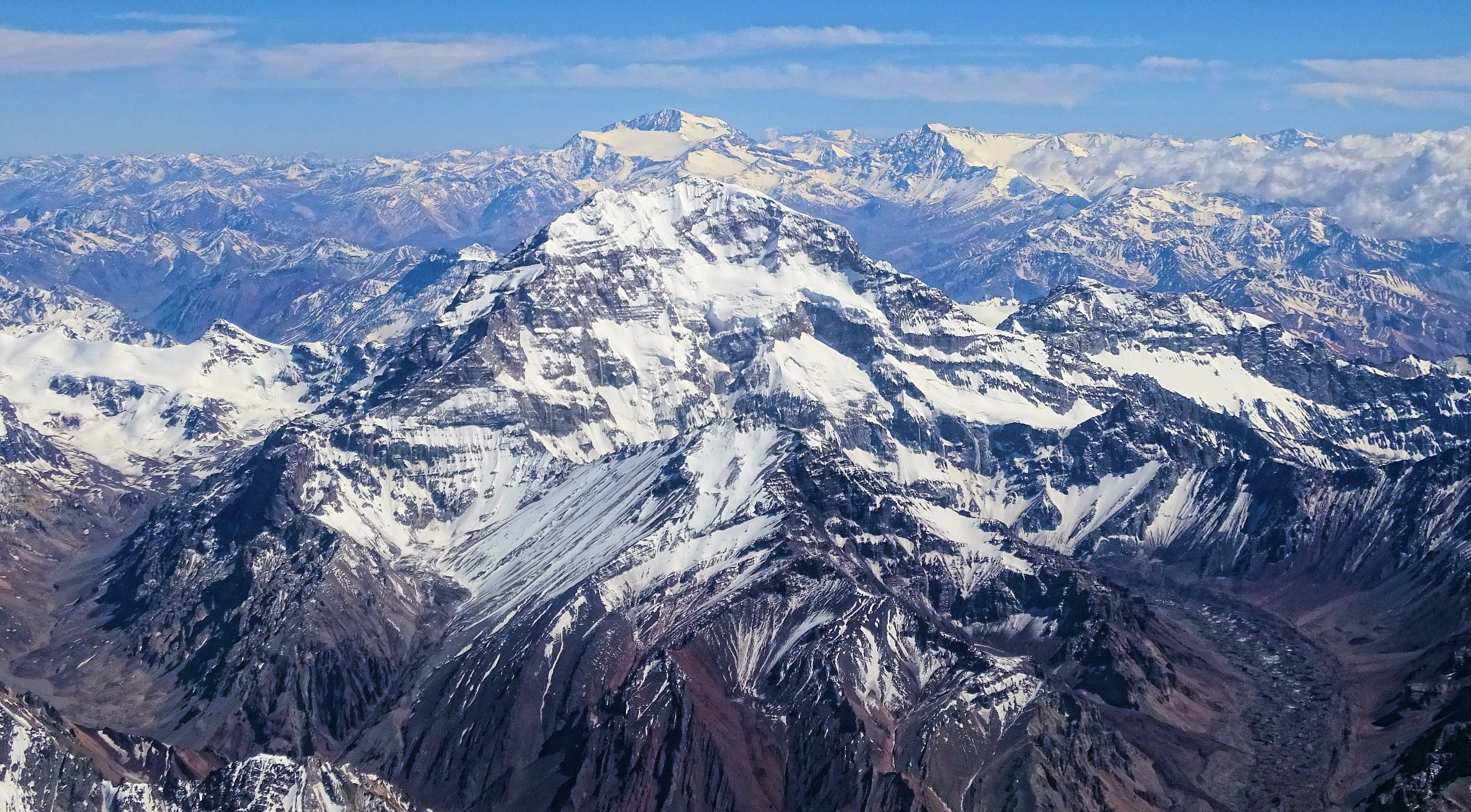
Aconcagua is the highest mountain outside of Asia, at 6,960.8 metres (22,837 ft), and the highest point in the Southern Hemisphere

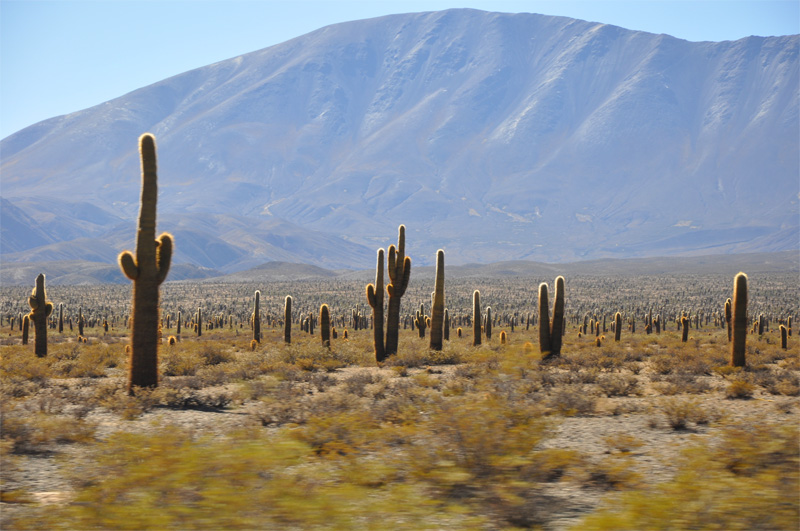
Los Cardones National Park

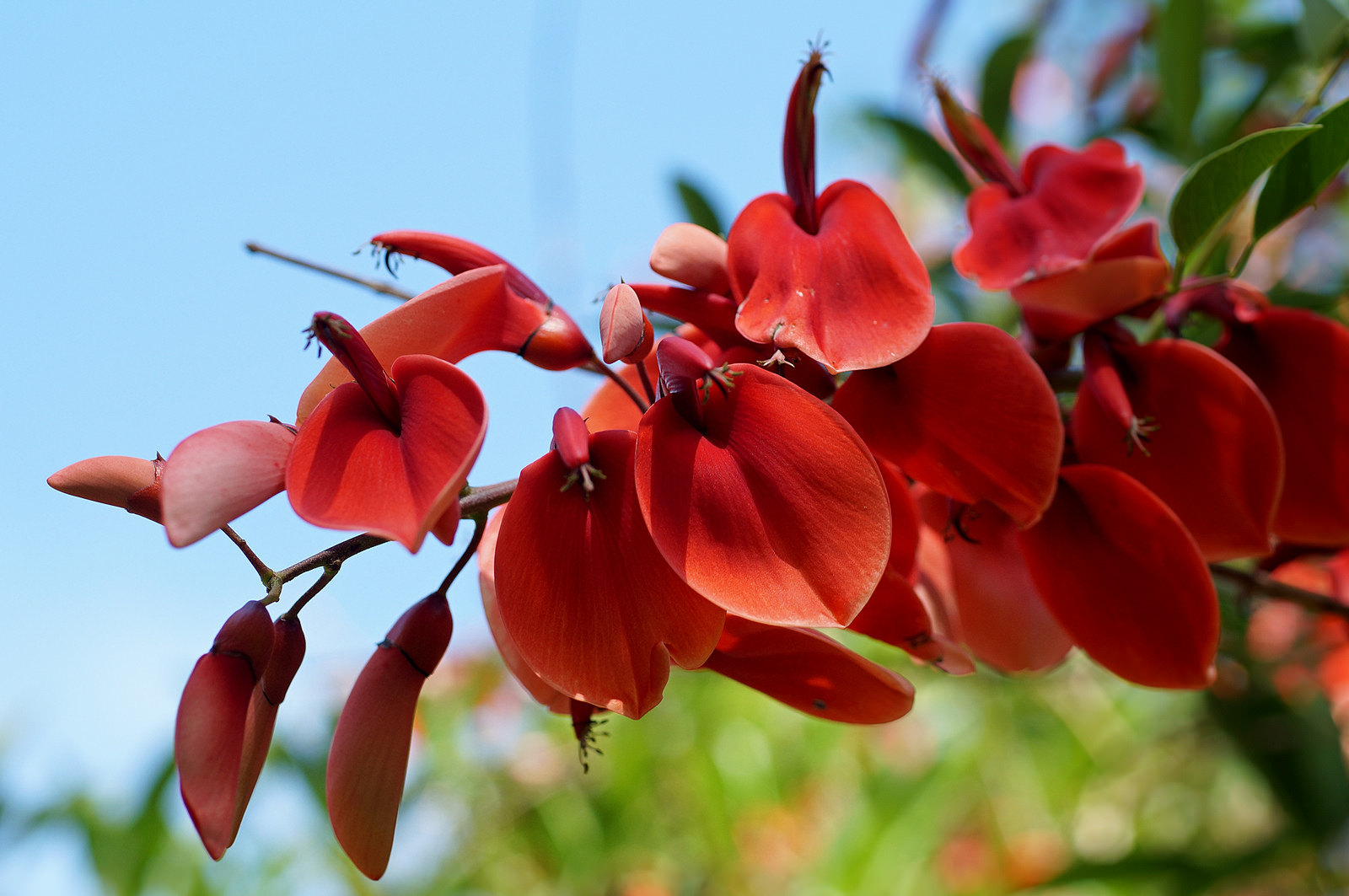
The ceibo flower (Erythrina crista-galli) is the national flower and tree of Argentina.

Argentina is one of the most biodiverse countries in the world hosting one of the greatest ecosystem varieties in the world: 15 continental zones, 2 marine zones, and the Antarctic region are all represented in its territory. This huge ecosystem variety has led to a biological diversity that is among the world's largest: 9,372 catalogued vascular plant species (ranked 24th); (Note: Includes higher plants only: ferns and fern allies, conifers and cycads, and flowering plants.) 1,038 catalogued bird species (ranked 14th); (Note: Includes only birds that breed in Argentina, not those that migrate or winter there.) 375 catalogued mammal species (ranked 12th); (Note: Excludes marine mammals.) 338 catalogued reptilian species (ranked 16th); and 162 catalogued amphibian species (ranked 19th).

Forest cover is around 10% of the total land area, equivalent to 28,573,000 hectares (ha) of forest in 2020, down from 35,204,000 hectares (ha) in 1990. In 2020, naturally regenerating forest covered 27,137,000 hectares (ha), and planted forest covered 1,436,000 hectares (ha). Of the naturally regenerating forest 0% was reported to be primary forest (consisting of native tree species with no clearly visible indications of human activity), and around 7% of the forest area was found within protected areas. In 2015, 0% of the forest area was reported to be under public ownership, 4% private ownership and 96% with ownership listed as other or unknown. Argentina had a 2018 Forest Landscape Integrity Index mean score of 7.21/10, ranking it 47th globally out of 172 countries.

The original pampas had virtually no trees; some imported species such as the American sycamore and eucalyptus are present along roads and in towns and country estates (estancias). The only tree-like plant endemic to the pampas is the evergreen Ombú. The surface soils of the pampas are a deep black colour, primarily mollisols, known commonly as humus. This makes the region one of the most agriculturally productive on Earth; however, commercial agriculture has decimated much of the original ecosystem. The western pampas receive less rainfall, this dry pampas is a plain of short grasses or steppe.

There are 35 national parks in Argentina, covering varied terrains and biotopes, from Baritú National Park on the northern border to Tierra del Fuego National Park in the far south of the continent. The Administración de Parques Nacionales (National Parks Administration) preserves and manages the national parks along with natural monuments and national reserves.

=== Climate ===
A map of Argentina's climate zones

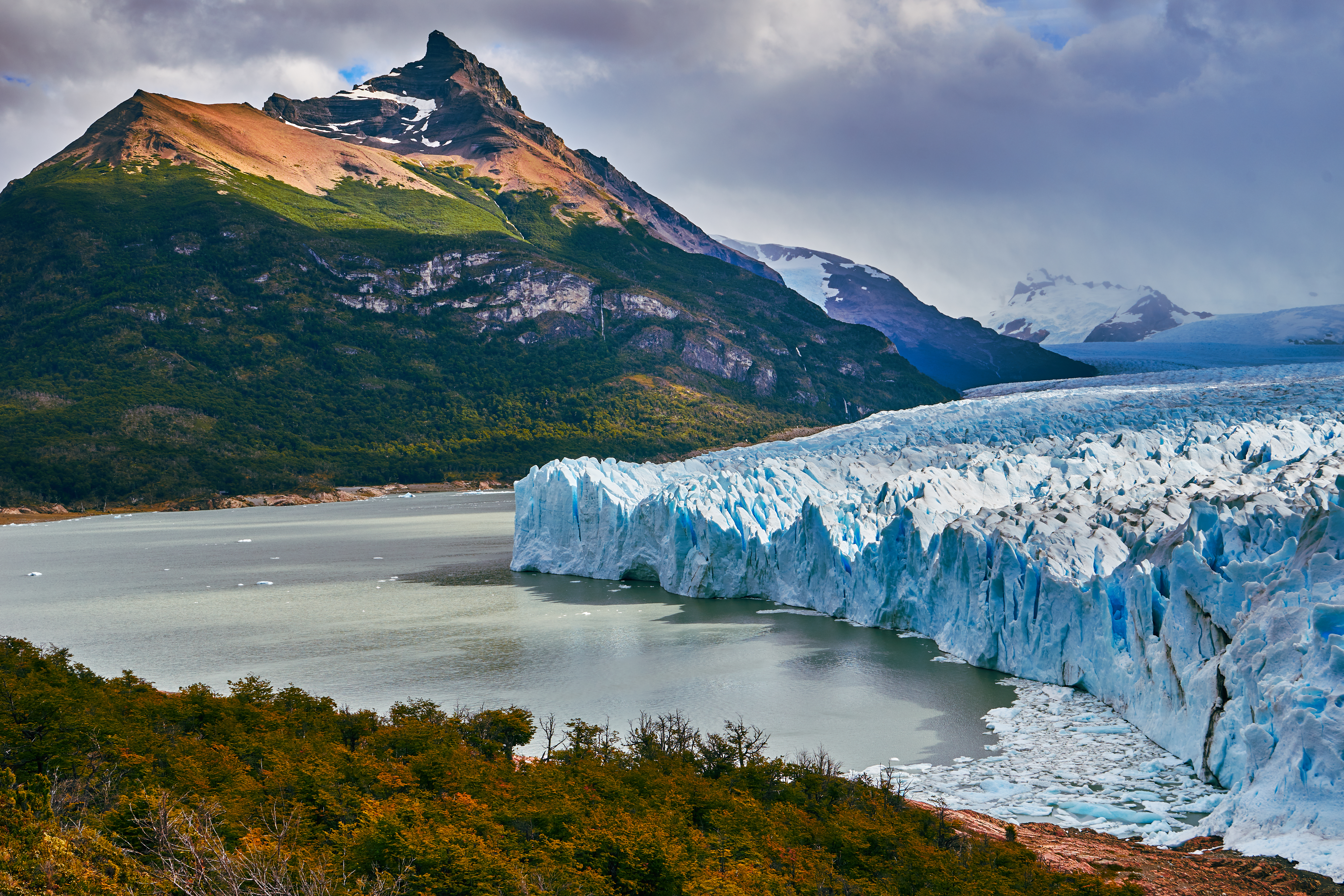
Argentina features geographical locations such as this glacier, known as the Perito Moreno Glacier

There are four main climate types: warm humid subtropical, moderate humid subtropical, arid, and cold, all determined by the expanse across latitude, range in altitude, and relief features. ranging from subtropical in the north to polar in the far south. Consequently, there is a wide variety of biomes, including subtropical rainforests, semi-arid and arid regions, temperate plains in the pampas, and cold subantarctic in the south. The average annual precipitation ranges from 150 millimetres (6 in) in the driest parts of Patagonia to over 2,000 millimetres (79 in) in the westernmost parts of Patagonia and the northeastern parts of the country. Mean annual temperatures range from 5 °C (41 °F) in the far south to 25 °C (77 °F) in the north.

Major wind currents include the cool pampero winds blowing on the flat plains of Patagonia and the pampas; following the cold front, warm currents blow from the north in middle and late winter, creating mild conditions. The Sudestada usually moderates cold temperatures but brings very heavy rains, rough seas and coastal flooding. It is most common in late autumn and winter along the central coast and in the Río de la Plata estuary.

The Zonda, a hot dry wind, affects Cuyo and the central pampas. Squeezed of all moisture during the 6,000 m (19,685 ft) descent from the Andes, Zonda winds can blow for hours with gusts up to 120 km/h (75 mph), fuelling wildfires and causing damage; between June and November, when the Zonda blows, snowstorms and blizzard (viento blanco) conditions usually affect higher elevations.

Climate change in Argentina is predicted to have significant effects on the living conditions. The climate of Argentina is changing with regards to precipitation patterns and temperatures. The highest increases in precipitation (from the period 1960–2010) have occurred in the eastern parts of the country. The increase in precipitation has led to more variability in precipitation from year to year in the northern parts of the country, with a higher risk of prolonged droughts, disfavouring agriculture in these regions.

== Government and politics ==
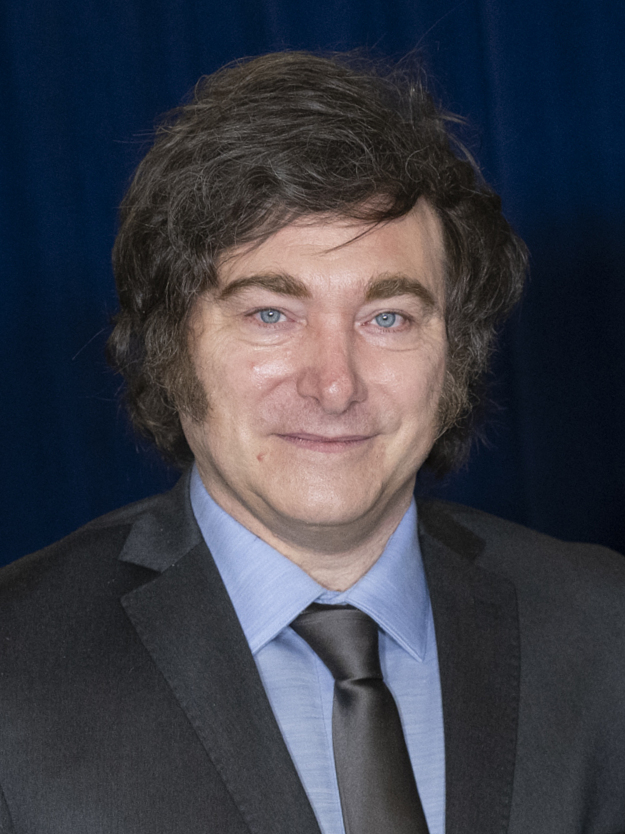
Javier Milei
President

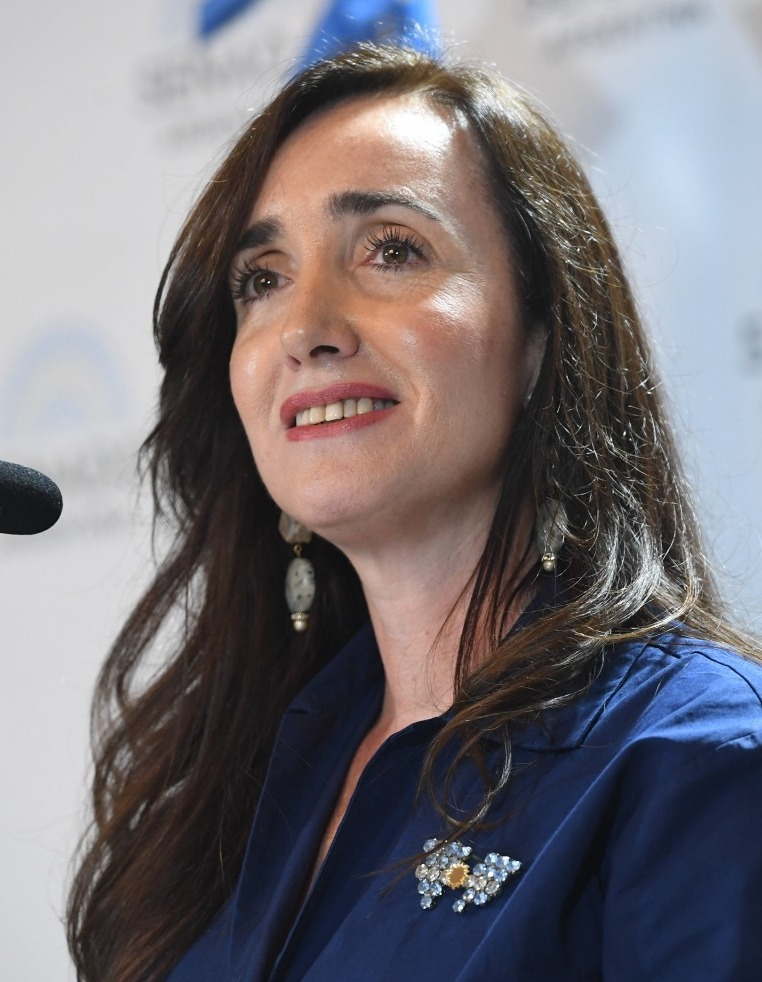
Victoria Villarruel
Vice President

In the 20th century, Argentina experienced significant political turmoil and democratic reversals. Between 1930 and 1976, the armed forces overthrew six governments in Argentina; and the country alternated periods of democracy (1912–1930, 1946–1955, and 1973–1976) with periods of restricted democracy and military rule. Following a transition that began in 1983, full-scale democracy was reestablished, which endured through the 2001–02 crisis and to the present day; it is regarded as more robust than both its pre-1983 predecessors and other democracies in Latin America. According to International IDEA's Global State of Democracy Indices and Democracy Tracker, Argentina performs in the mid-range on overall democratic measures, with particular strengths in freedom of religion, inclusive suffrage, and civic engagement. Moreover, according to the V-Dem Democracy indices, Argentina in 2023 was the second most electoral democratic country in Latin America.

=== Government ===
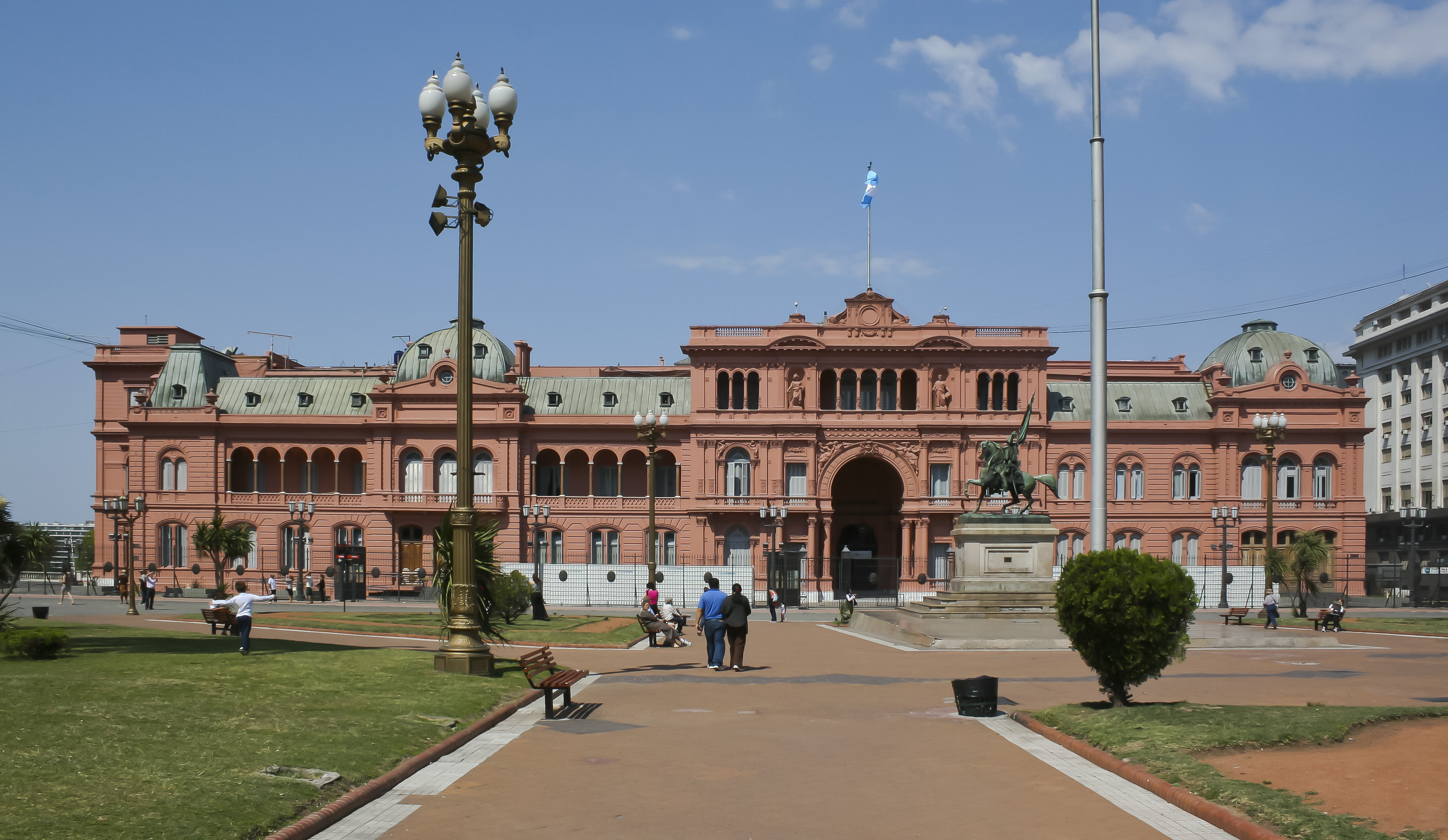
Casa Rosada in Buenos Aires, workplace of the Argentine president

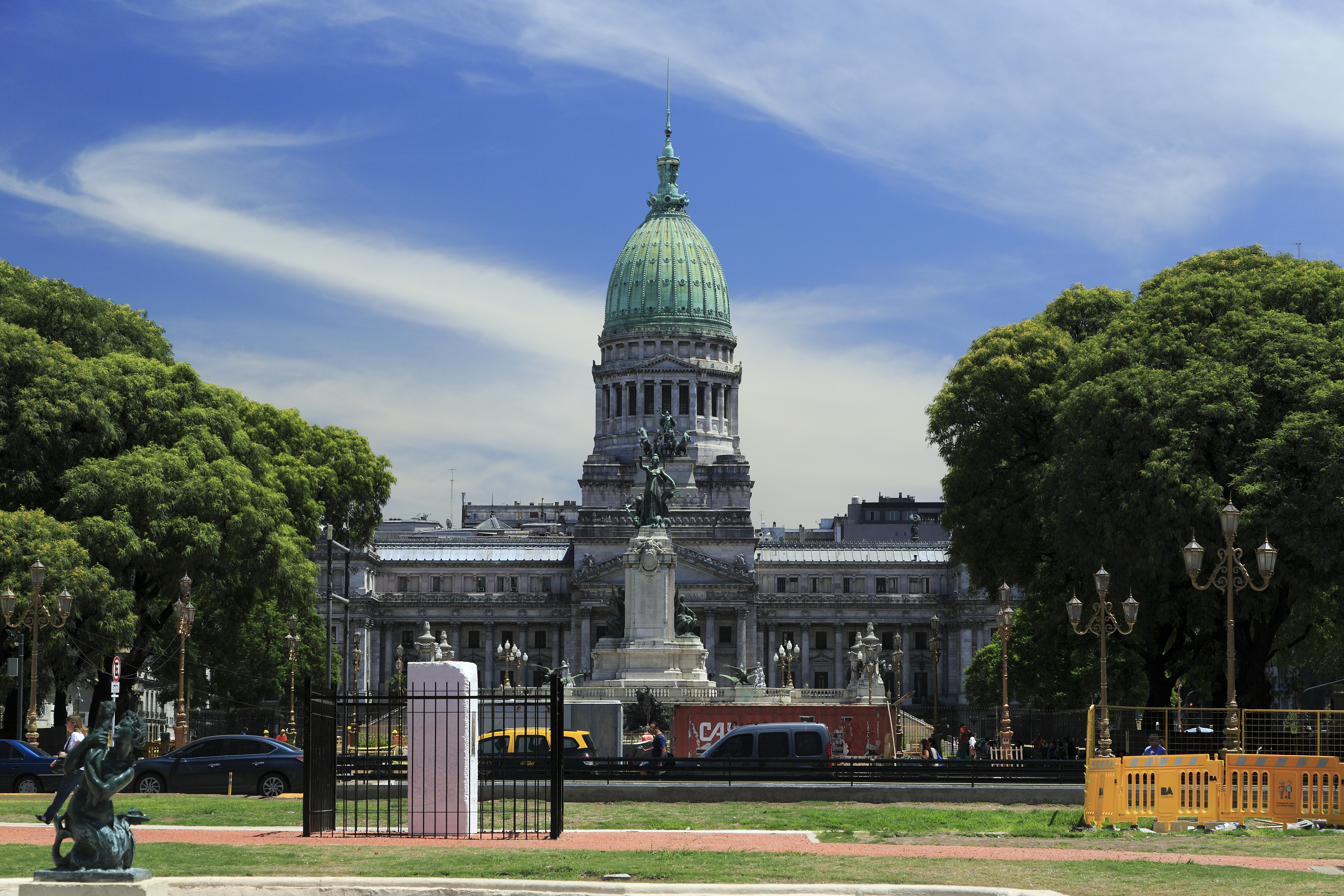
The National Congress is composed of the Senate and the Chamber of Deputies.

Argentina is a federal constitutional republic and representative democracy. The government is regulated by a system of checks and balances defined by the Constitution of Argentina, the supreme legal document. The seat of government is Buenos Aires, as designated by Congress. Suffrage is universal, equal, secret and mandatory. (Note: Since 2012 suffrage is optional for ages 16 and 17.)

The federal government is composed of three branches. The legislative branch consists of the bicameral Congress, made up of the Senate and the Chamber of Deputies. The Congress makes federal law, declares war, approves treaties and has the power of the purse and of impeachment, by which it can remove sitting members of the government. The Chamber of Deputies represents the people and has 257 voting members elected to a four-year term. Seats are apportioned among the provinces by population every tenth year. As of 2014 ten provinces have just five deputies while the Buenos Aires Province, being the most populous one, has 70. The Chamber of Senators represents the provinces, and has 72 members elected at-large to six-year terms, with each province having three seats; one-third of Senate seats are up for election every other year. At least one-third of the candidates presented by the parties must be women.

In the executive branch, the president is the commander-in-chief of the military, can veto legislative bills before they become law—subject to Congressional override—and appoints the members of the Cabinet and other officers, who administer and enforce federal laws and policies. The president is elected directly by the vote of the people, serves a four-year term and may be elected to office no more than twice in a row.

The judicial branch includes the Supreme Court and lower federal courts interpret laws and overturn those they find unconstitutional. The judicial is independent of the executive and the legislative. The Supreme Court has seven members appointed by the president—subject to Senate approval—who serve for life. The lower courts' judges are proposed by the Council of Magistracy (a secretariat composed of representatives of judges, lawyers, researchers, the executive and the legislative), and appointed by the president on Senate approval.

=== Provinces ===
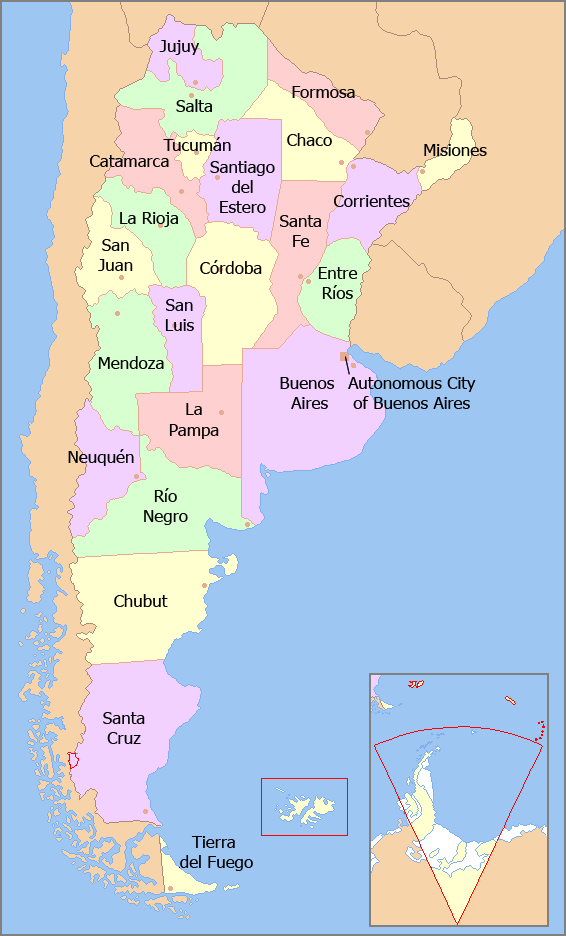
Provinces of Argentina. Click to explore.

Argentina is a federation of twenty-three provinces and one autonomous city, Buenos Aires. Provinces are divided for administration purposes into departments and municipalities, except for Buenos Aires Province, which is divided into partidos. The city of Buenos Aires is divided into communes.

Provinces hold all the power that they choose not to delegate to the federal government; they must be representative republics and must not contradict the constitution. Beyond this they are fully autonomous: they enact their own constitutions, freely organise their local governments, and own and manage their natural and financial resources. Some provinces have bicameral legislatures, while others have unicameral ones. (Note: Although not a province, the City of Buenos Aires is a federally autonomous city, and as such its local organisation has similarities with provinces: it has its own constitution, an elected mayor and representatives to the Senate and Deputy chambers. As federal capital of the nation it holds the status of federal district.)

La Pampa and Chaco became provinces in 1951. Misiones did so in 1953, and Formosa, Neuquén, Río Negro, Chubut and Santa Cruz, in 1955. The last national territory, Tierra del Fuego, became the Tierra del Fuego, Antártida e Islas del Atlántico Sur Province in 1990. It has three components, although two are nominal because they are not under Argentine sovereignty. The first is the Argentine part of Tierra del Fuego; the second is an area of Antarctica claimed by Argentina that overlaps with similar areas claimed by the UK and Chile; the third comprises the two disputed British Overseas Territories of the Falkland Islands and South Georgia and the South Sandwich Islands.

=== Foreign relations ===
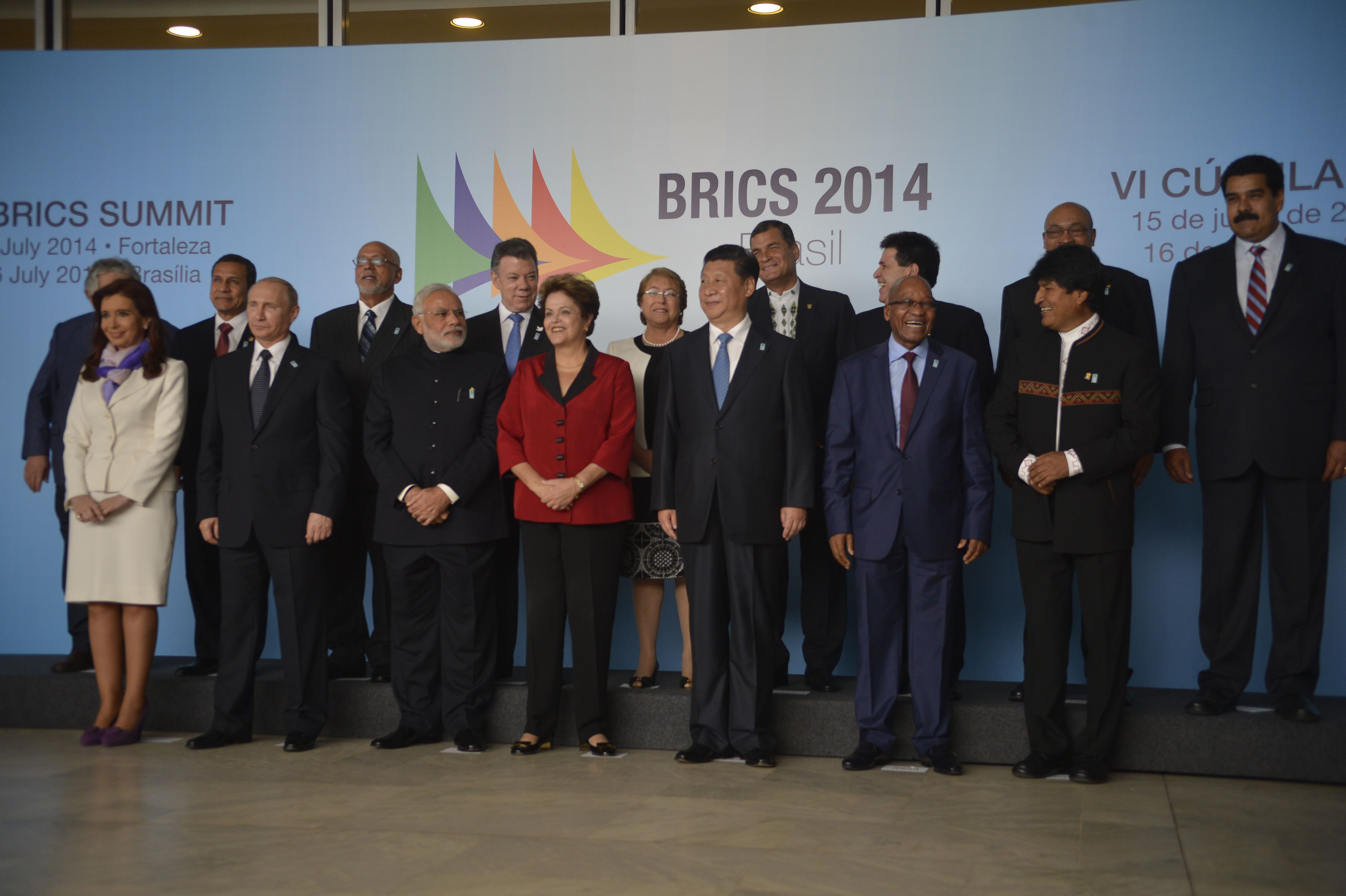
Cristina Kirchner alongside the members of BRICS and Union of South American Nations in 2014

Foreign policy is handled by the Ministry of Foreign Affairs, International Trade and Worship, which answers to the president. The country is one of the G-15 and G-20 major economies of the world, and a founding member of the UN, WBG, WTO and OAS. In 2012 Argentina was elected again to a two-year non-permanent position on the United Nations Security Council and is participating in major peacekeeping operations in Haiti, Cyprus, Western Sahara and the Middle East. Argentina is described as a middle power.

A prominent Latin American and Southern Cone regional power, Argentina cofounded OEI and CELAC. It is also a founding member of the Mercosur block, having Brazil, Paraguay, Uruguay and Venezuela as partners. Since 2002 the country has emphasised its key role in Latin American integration, and the block—which has some supranational legislative functions—is its first international priority.

Argentina claims 965,597 km^{2} (372,819 sq mi) in Antarctica, where it has the world's oldest continuous state presence since 1904. This overlaps claims by Chile and the United Kingdom, though all such claims fall under the provisions of the 1961 Antarctic Treaty, of which Argentina is a founding signatory and permanent consulting member, with the Antarctic Treaty Secretariat being based in Buenos Aires.

Argentina disputes sovereignty over the British possessions of the Falkland Islands, South Georgia and the South Sandwich Islands. Argentina is a party to the Rome Statute of the International Criminal Court. Argentina is a major non-NATO ally since 1998 and an OECD candidate country since January 2022.

=== Military ===
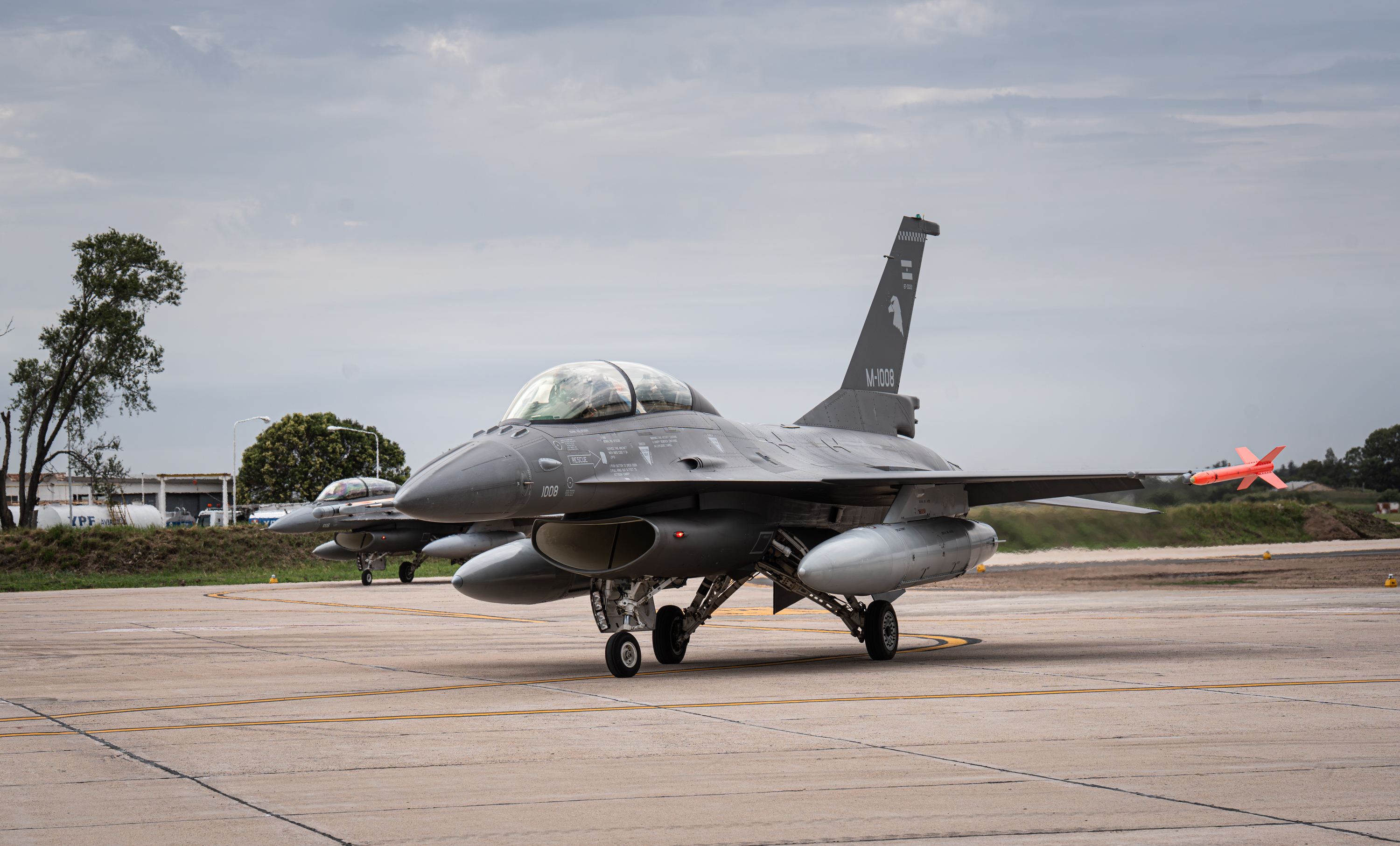
F-16 operated by the Argentine Air Force

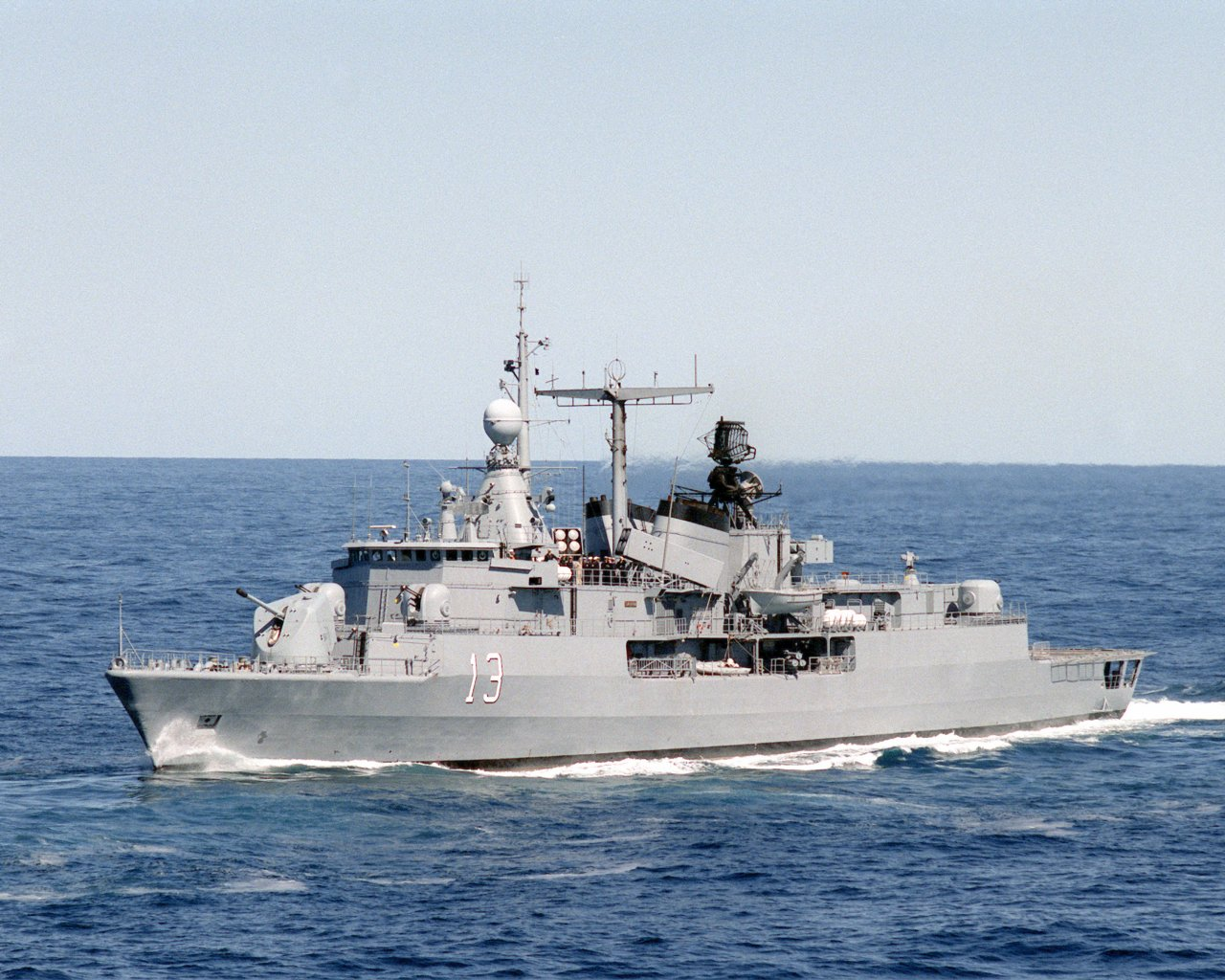
Argentine destroyer ARA Sarandí (D-13)

The president holds the title of commander-in-chief of the Argentine Armed Forces, as part of a legal framework that imposes a strict separation between national defence and internal security systems: The National Defence System, an exclusive responsibility of the federal government, coordinated by the Ministry of Defence, and comprising the Army, the Navy and the Air Force. Ruled and monitored by Congress through the Houses' Defence Committees, it is organised on the essential principle of legitimate self-defence: the repelling of any external military aggression in order to guarantee freedom of the people, national sovereignty, and territorial integrity. Its secondary missions include committing to multinational operations within the framework of the United Nations, participating in internal support missions, assisting friendly countries, and establishing a sub-regional defence system.

Military service is voluntary, with enlistment age between 18 and 24 years old and no conscription. Argentina's defence has historically been one of the best equipped in the region, even managing its own weapon research facilities, shipyards, ordnance, tank and plane factories. However, real military expenditures declined steadily after the defeat in the Falklands War, and the defence budget in 2011 was about 0.74% of GDP, a historical minimum, below the Latin American average. Within the defence budget, funding for training and even basic maintenance has been significantly cut, a factor contributing to the accidental loss of the Argentine submarine San Juan in 2017. The result has been a steady erosion of military capabilities, with some arguing that Argentina had, by the end of the 2010s, ceased to be a capable military power.

The Interior Security System is jointly administered by the federal and subscribing provincial governments. At the federal level it is coordinated by the Interior, Security and Justice ministries, and monitored by Congress. It is enforced by the Federal Police; the Prefecture, which fulfills coast guard duties; the Gendarmerie, which serves border guard tasks; and the Airport Security Police. At the provincial level it is coordinated by the respective internal security ministries and enforced by local police agencies.

Argentina was the only South American country to send warships and cargo planes in 1991 to the Gulf War under UN mandate and has remained involved in peacekeeping efforts in multiple locations such as UNPROFOR in Croatia/Bosnia, Gulf of Fonseca, UNFICYP in Cyprus (where among Army and Marines troops the Air Force provided the UN Air contingent since 1994) and MINUSTAH in Haiti. Argentina is the only Latin American country to maintain troops in Kosovo during SFOR (and later EUFOR) operations where combat engineers of the Argentine Armed Forces are embedded in an Italian brigade. In 2007, an Argentine contingent including helicopters, boats and water purification plants was sent to help Bolivia against their worst floods in decades. In 2010 the Armed Forces were involved in Haiti and in Chile humanitarian responses after their respective earthquakes.

== Economy ==
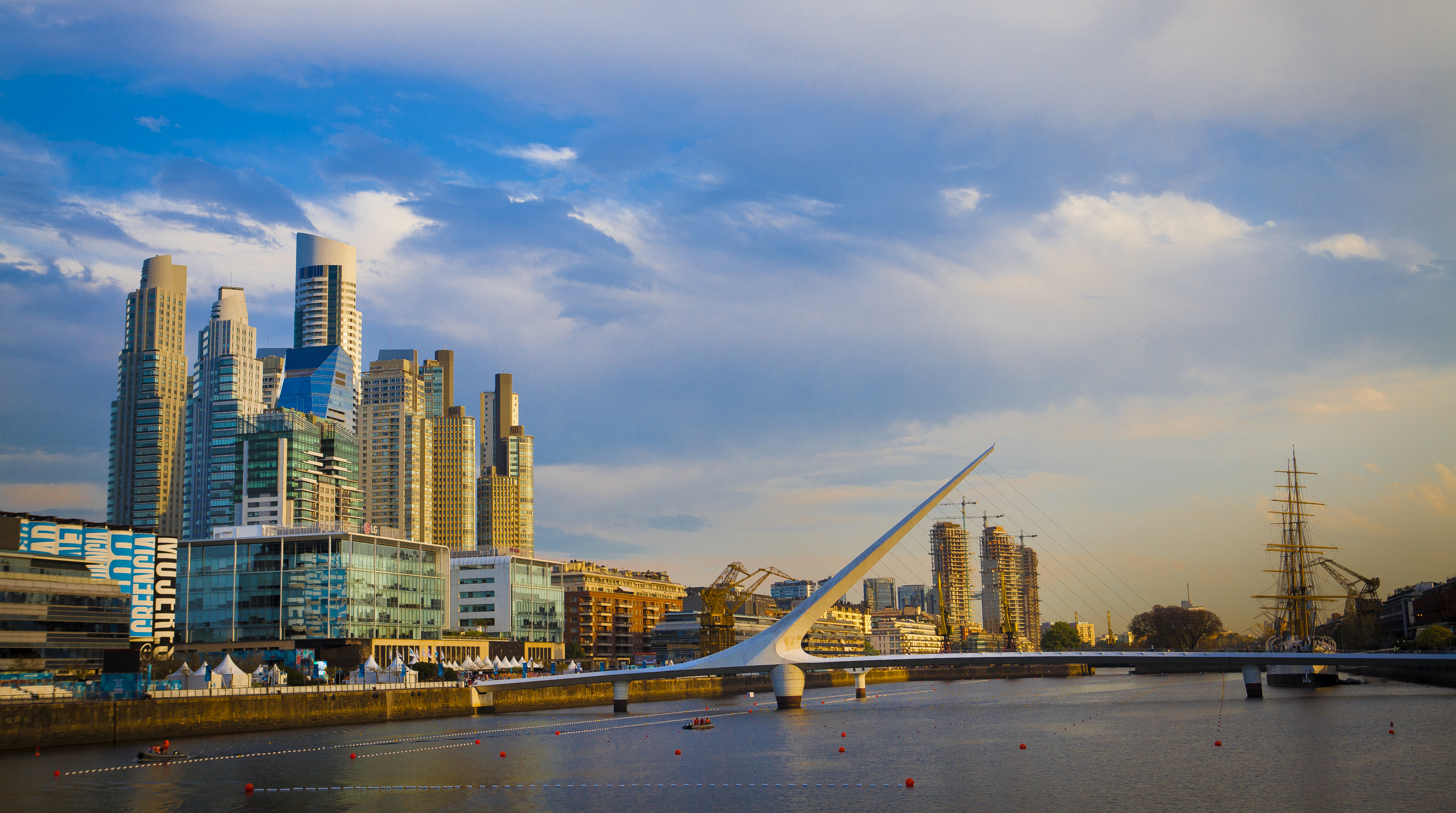
The Puerto Madero business complex in Buenos Aires CBD

Benefiting from rich natural resources, a highly literate population, a diversified industrial base, and an export-oriented agricultural sector, Argentina's economy is Latin America's third-largest and the second-largest in South America. In 1913, Argentina was one of the wealthiest countries in the world by GDP per capita. It has a "very high" rating on the Human Development Index and ranks 66th by nominal GDP per capita, with a considerable internal market size and a growing share of the high-tech sector. As a middle emerging economy and one of the world's top developing nations, it is a member of the G-20 major economies. (Note: The other top developing nations being Brazil, China, India, Indonesia, Mexico, South Africa and Turkey.)

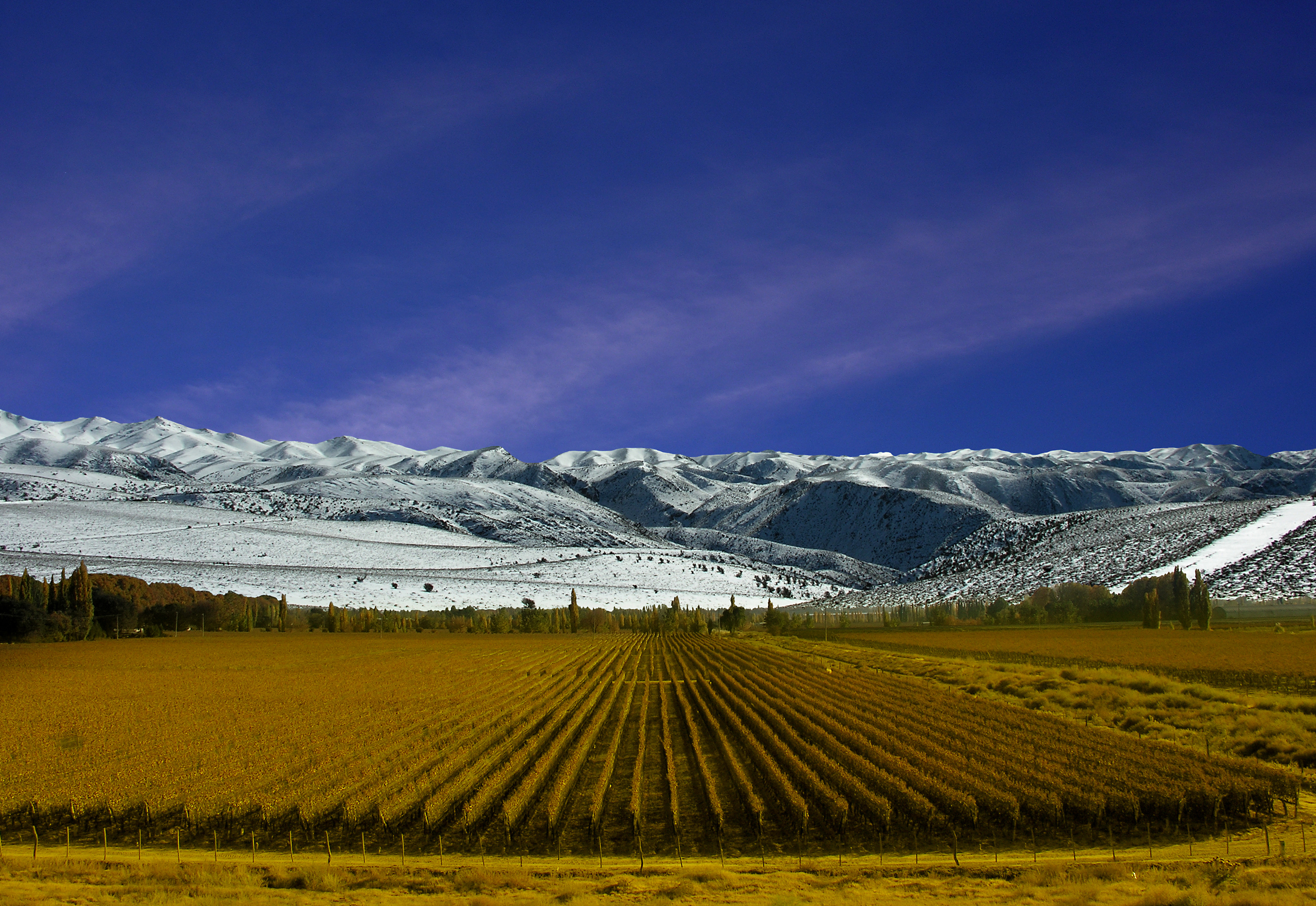
A vineyard in Mendoza. Argentina is the sixth-largest producer of wine.

Argentina is the largest producer in the world of yerba mate (due to the large domestic consumption of mate), one of the five largest producers in the world of soybeans, maize, sunflower seed, lemon and pear, one of the ten largest producers in the world of barley, grape, artichoke, tobacco and cotton, and one of the 15 largest producers in the world of wheat, sugarcane, sorghum and grapefruit. It is the largest producer in South America of wheat, sunflower seed, barley, lemon and pear. In wine, Argentina is usually among the ten largest producers in the world. Argentina is a traditional meat exporter, having been, in 2019, the 4th world producer of beef, with a production of 3 million tons (only behind US, Brazil and China), the 4th world producer of honey, and the 10th world producer of wool.

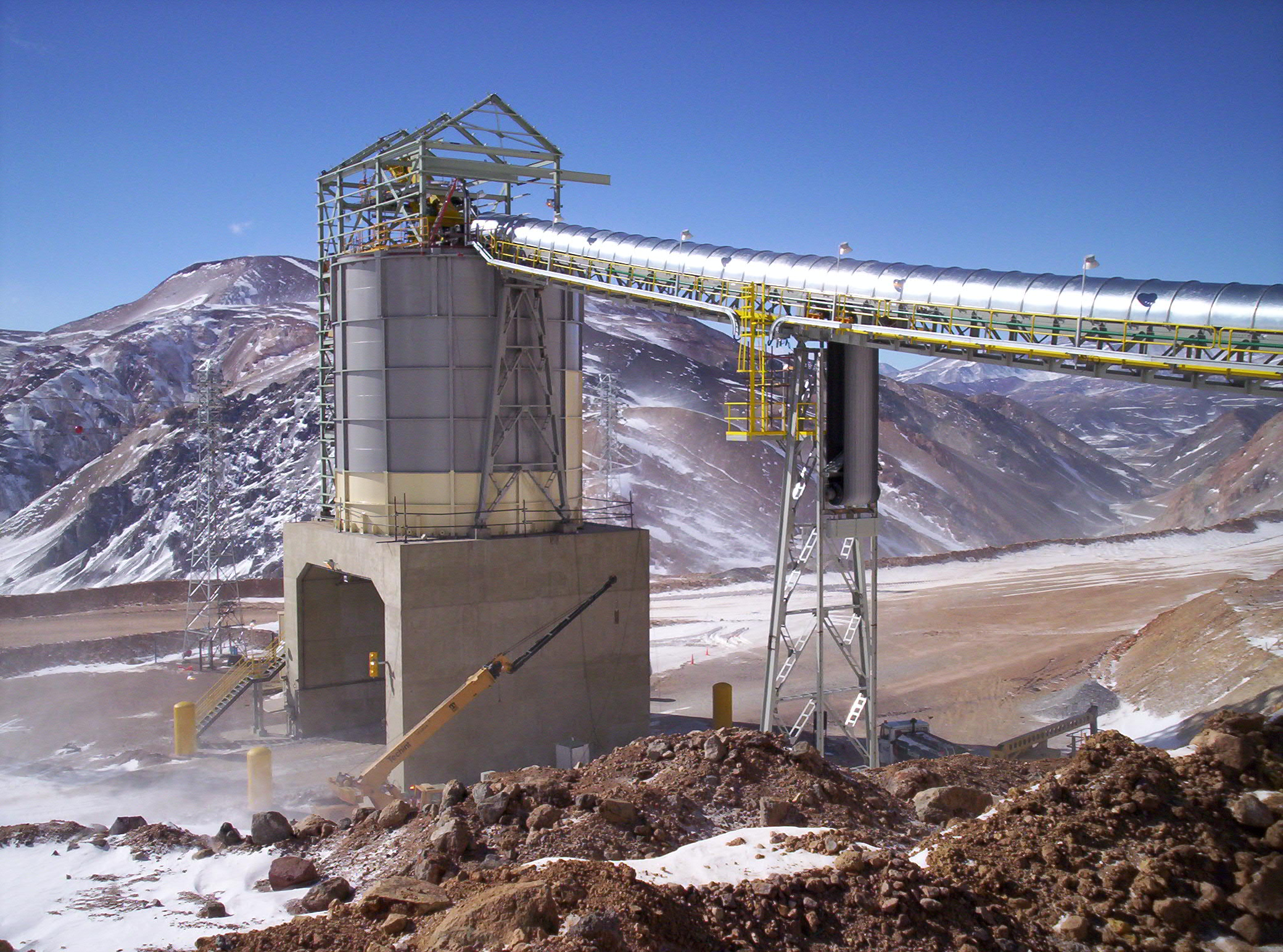
Veladero mine is a gold mine in San Juan Province.

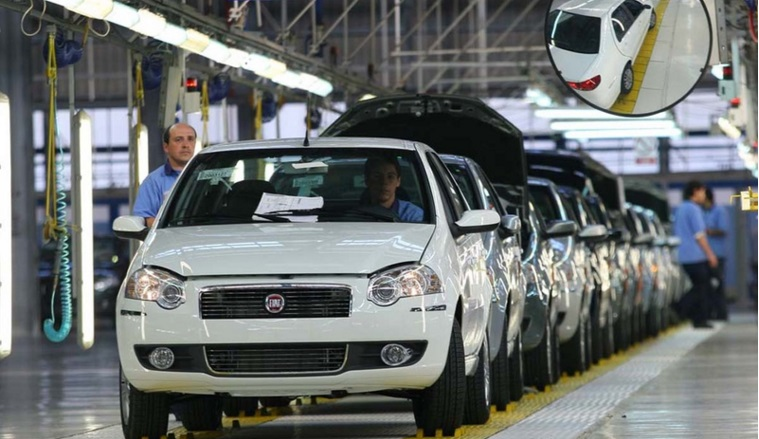
Fiat factory in Córdoba

Mining in Argentina is less prominent compared to other countries but stands out as the fourth-largest producer of lithium, the 11th-largest of silver and 17th-largest of gold worldwide. Argentina is the largest producer of natural gas in South America and the 18th-largest globally. Argentina produces an average of 500,000 barrels/day of petroleum, despite the under-utilisation of the Vaca Muerta field due to technical and financial limitations in resource extraction.

In 2012, manufacturing accounted for 20.3% of GDP—the largest sector in the economy. Half of the industrial exports have rural origin. With a 6.5% production growth rate in 2011, the diversified manufacturing sector rests on a steadily growing network of industrial parks, 314 in 2013. In 2012, the leading sectors by volume were: food processing, beverages and tobacco products; motor vehicles and auto parts; textiles and leather; refinery products and biodiesel; chemicals and pharmaceuticals; steel, aluminium and iron; industrial and farm machinery; home appliances and furniture; plastics and tires; glass and cement; and recording and print media.

Argentina ranks 85th out of 180 countries in the Transparency International's 2017 Corruption Perceptions Index, an improvement of 22 positions over its 2014 rankings. Argentina settled its long-standing debt default crisis in 2016 with the so-called vulture funds after the election of Mauricio Macri, allowing Argentina to enter capital markets for the first time in a decade. The government defaulted in May 2020 by failing to pay a $500 million bill by its due date to its creditors. Negotiations for the restructuring of $66 billion of its debt continue.

High inflation—a weakness of the economy for decades—has become a trouble once again, recently peaking at 220% in 2024. Approximately 43% of the population lived below the poverty line in 2023. To deter it and support the peso, the government imposed foreign currency control. Income distribution, having improved since 2002, is classified as "medium", although it is still considerably unequal.

President Milei has pursued deregulation policies to alleviate the national economic crisis. In January 2024, the poverty rate reached 57.4%, the highest since 2004. By the second semester of 2024, however, poverty levels had fallen sharply to 38%, the lowest since 2022. In November 2024, monthly inflation slowed to 2.4%, the lowest in over four years. Annual inflation was expected to end 2024 closer to 100%. In 2025, the inflation rate was 31.5%. As of June 2026, the expected inflation rate is 2.2%. Economic activity has also begun to recover after the severe recession at the beginning of 2024. The economy expanded in 2025 by 4.4%.

=== Tourism ===
Argentina had 5.57 million visitors in 2013, the top international tourist destination in South America, and the second in Latin America after Mexico. Revenues from international tourists reached US$4.41 billion in 2013, down from US$4.89 billion in 2012. Buenos Aires is the most visited city in South America.

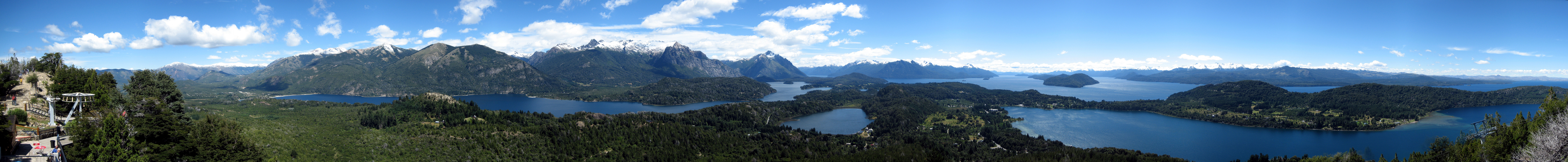
A panorama of the Nahuel Huapi National Park and the Nahuel Huapi Lake from Cerro Campanario, Bariloche

=== Transport ===
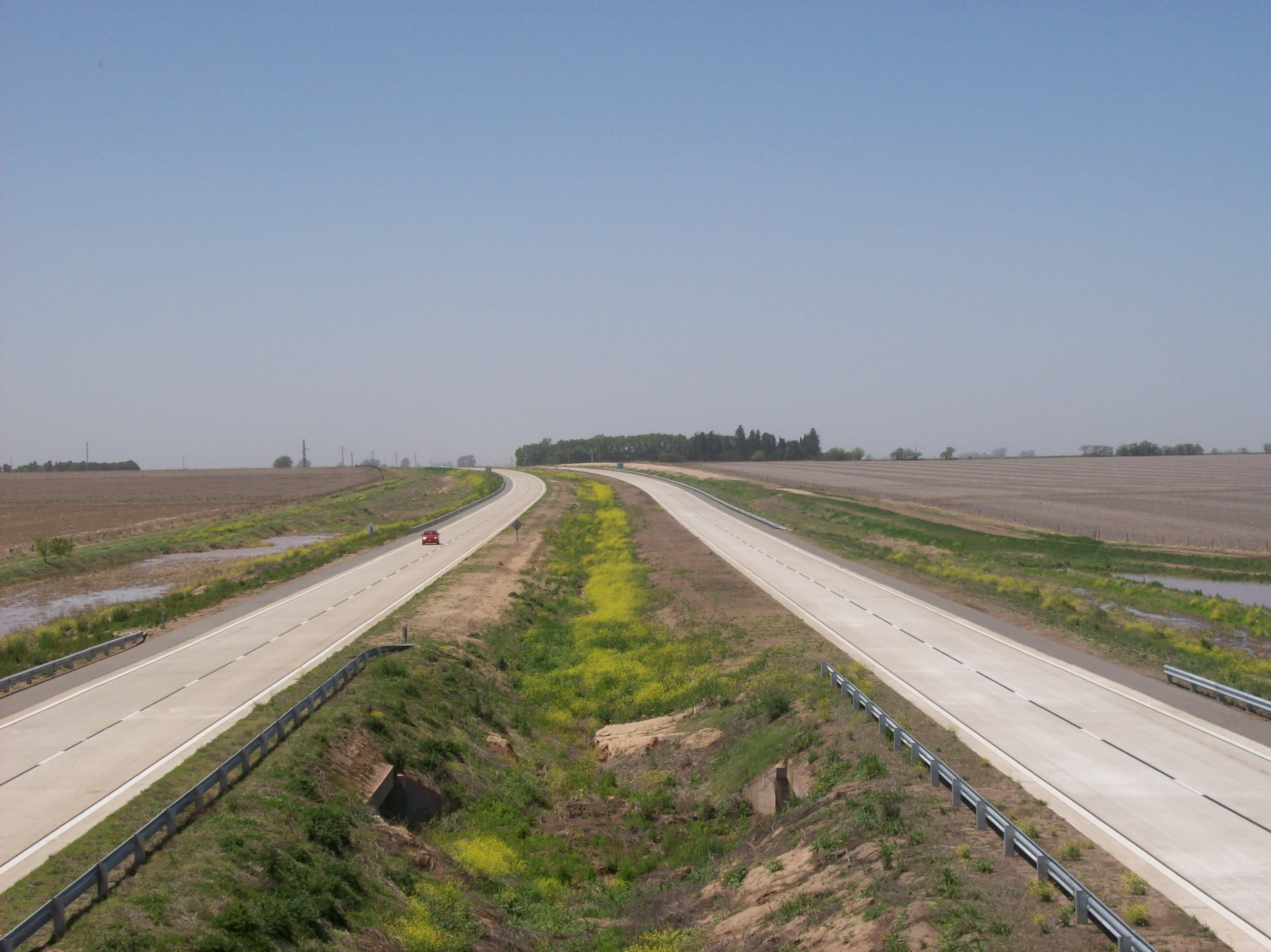
A stretch of National Route 9 between Rosario and Córdoba

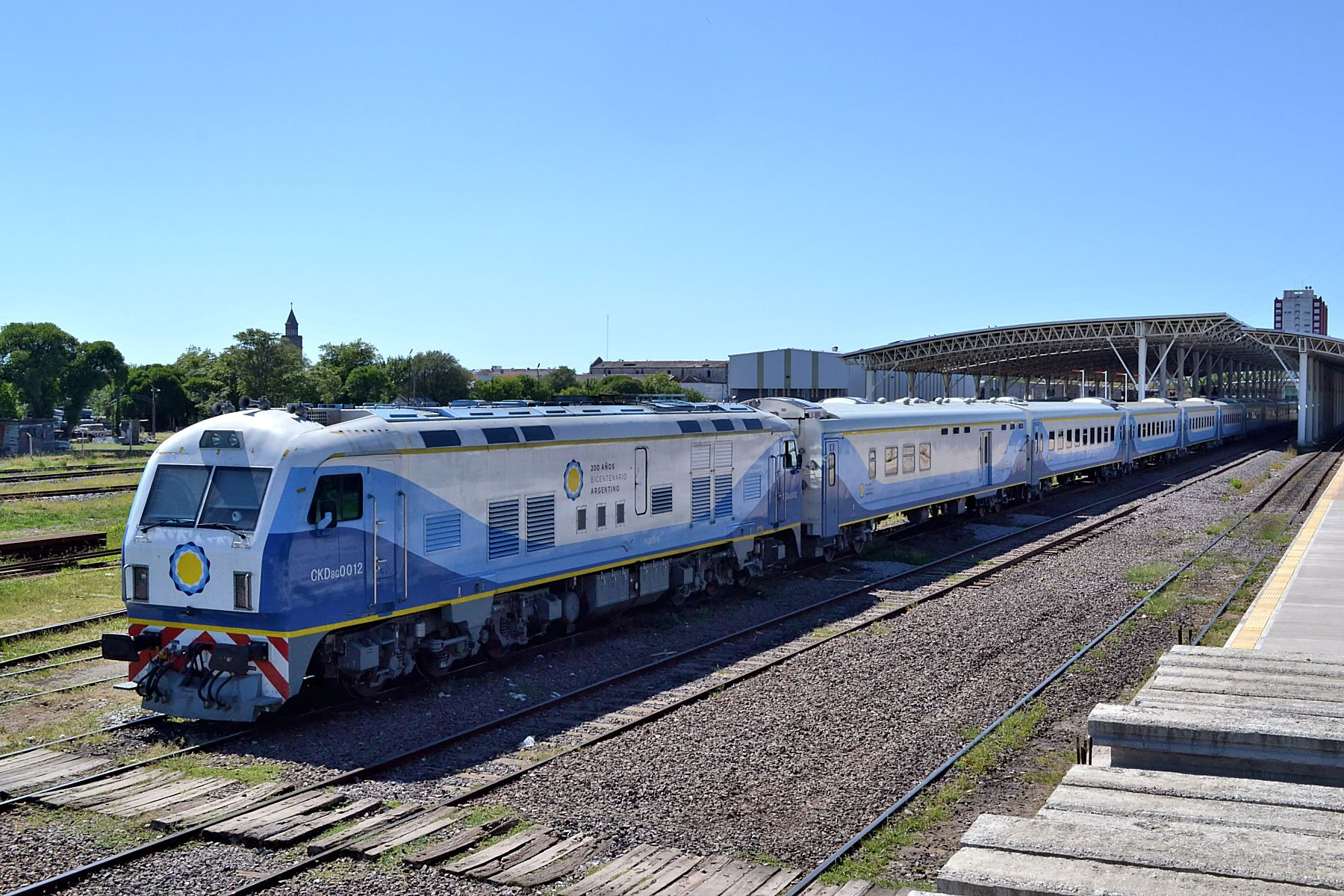
A Trenes Argentinos train at Mar del Plata railway station

In 2004, Buenos Aires, all provincial capitals except Ushuaia, and all medium-sized towns were interconnected by 69,412 km (43,131 mi) of paved roads, out of a road network of 231,374 km (143,769 mi). In 2021, Argentina had about 2,800 km (1,740 mi) of dual carriageways, most leaving Buenos Aires and linking it with Rosario, Córdoba, Santa Fe, Mar del Plata and Paso de los Libres. There are also dual carriageways leaving from Mendoza towards the capital, and between Córdoba and Santa Fé, among other locations. Nevertheless, this road infrastructure is still inadequate and cannot handle the sharply growing demand caused by deterioration of the railway system.

The Argentine rail system is the largest in Latin America, with 36,966 km (22,970 mi) of operating lines in 2008, out of a network of almost 48,000 km (29,826 mi). The system links all 23 provinces and connects with all neighbouring countries. There are four incompatible gauges in use; this forces virtually all interregional freight traffic to pass through Buenos Aires. The system has been in decline since the 1940s: regularly running up large budgetary deficits. In recent years the system has experienced a greater degree of investment from the state, in both commuter rail lines and long-distance lines, renewing rolling stock and infrastructure. In April 2015, by overwhelming majority the Senate passed a law which recreated Ferrocarriles Argentinos, effectively renationalising the railways, a move which saw support from all major political parties on both sides of the political spectrum.

In 2012, there were about 11,000 km (6,835 mi) of waterways, mostly comprising the La Plata, Paraná, Paraguay and Uruguay rivers, with Buenos Aires, Zárate, Campana, Rosario, San Lorenzo, Santa Fe, Barranqueras and San Nicolas de los Arroyos as the main fluvial ports. Some of the largest sea ports are La Plata–Ensenada, Bahía Blanca, Mar del Plata, Quequén–Necochea, Comodoro Rivadavia, Puerto Deseado, Puerto Madryn, Ushuaia and San Antonio Oeste. Buenos Aires has historically been the most important port. Since the 1990s the Up-River port region has become dominant: stretching along 67 km (42 mi) of the Paraná river shore in Santa Fe province, it includes 17 ports and in 2013 accounted for 50% of all exports.

In 2013, there were 161 airports with paved runways out of more than a thousand. The Ezeiza International Airport, about 35 km (22 mi) from downtown Buenos Aires, is the largest in Argentina, followed by Cataratas del Iguazú in Misiones, and El Plumerillo in Mendoza. Aeroparque in Buenos Aires is the most important domestic airport.

=== Energy ===
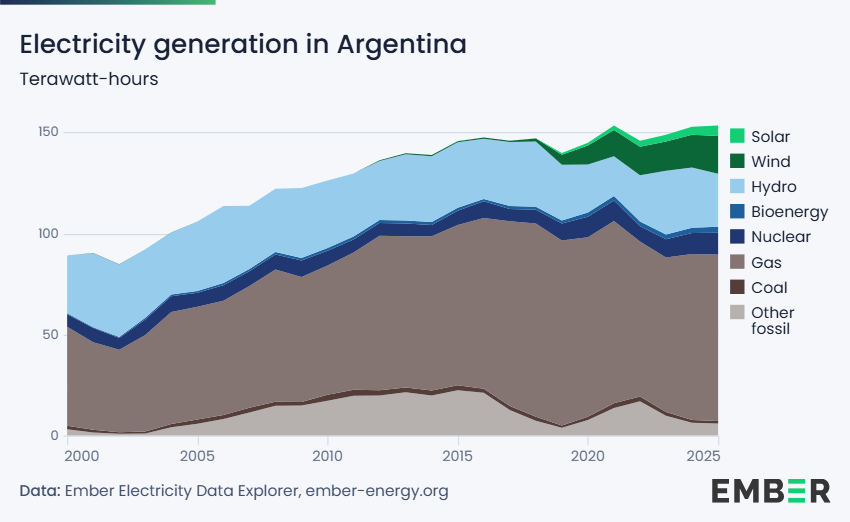
Electricity generation in Argentina in terawatt-hours, 2000 to 2025

In 2020, more than 60% of electricity came from non-renewable sources such as natural gas, oil and coal. 27% came from hydropower, 7.3% from wind and solar energy and 4.4% from nuclear energy. At the end of 2021 Argentina was the 21st country in the world in terms of installed hydroelectric power (11.3 GW), the 26th in installed wind energy (3.2 GW) and the 43rd in installed solar energy (1.0 GW).

The wind potential of the Patagonia region is considered gigantic, with estimates that the area could provide enough electricity to sustain the consumption of a country like Brazil alone. However, Argentina has faced infrastructure challenges in transferring electricity from wind-rich rural areas to its population hubs.

In 1974, Argentina was the first country in Latin America to put a commercial nuclear power plant online, Atucha I. Although the Argentine-built parts for that station amounted to 10% of the total, the nuclear fuel it uses are from Argentina. Later nuclear power stations employed a higher percentage of Argentine-built components. Embalse, finished in 1983, used 30% and the 2011 Atucha II reactor used 40%.

=== Science and technology ===
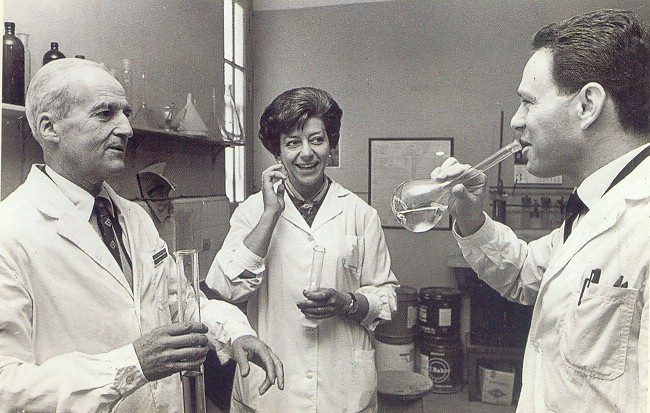
Luis Federico Leloir (left) and his staff toast his 1970 Nobel Prize in Chemistry.

Argentines have received three Nobel Prizes in the sciences. Bernardo Houssay, the first Latin American recipient, discovered the role of pituitary hormones in regulating glucose in animals, and shared the Nobel Prize in Physiology or Medicine in 1947. Luis Leloir discovered how organisms store energy converting glucose into glycogen and the compounds which are fundamental in metabolising carbohydrates, receiving the Nobel Prize in Chemistry in 1970. César Milstein did extensive research in antibodies, sharing the Nobel Prize in Physiology or Medicine in 1984. Argentine research has led to treatments for heart diseases and several forms of cancer. Domingo Liotta designed and developed the first artificial heart that was successfully implanted in a human being in 1969. René Favaloro developed the techniques and performed the world's first coronary bypass surgery.

Argentina was the first country in Latin America to design and build a research reactor with homegrown technology, the RA-1 Enrico Fermi. This reliance on the development of its own nuclear-related technologies, instead of buying them abroad, was a constant of Argentina's nuclear programme conducted by the civilian National Atomic Energy Commission. Nuclear facilities with Argentine technology have been built in Peru, Algeria, Australia and Egypt. In 1983, Argentina admitted having the capability of producing weapon-grade uranium, a major step needed to assemble nuclear weapons. Since then, Argentina has pledged to use nuclear power only for peaceful purposes. As a member of the Board of Governors of the International Atomic Energy Agency, Argentina supports nuclear non-proliferation efforts and is committed to global nuclear security.

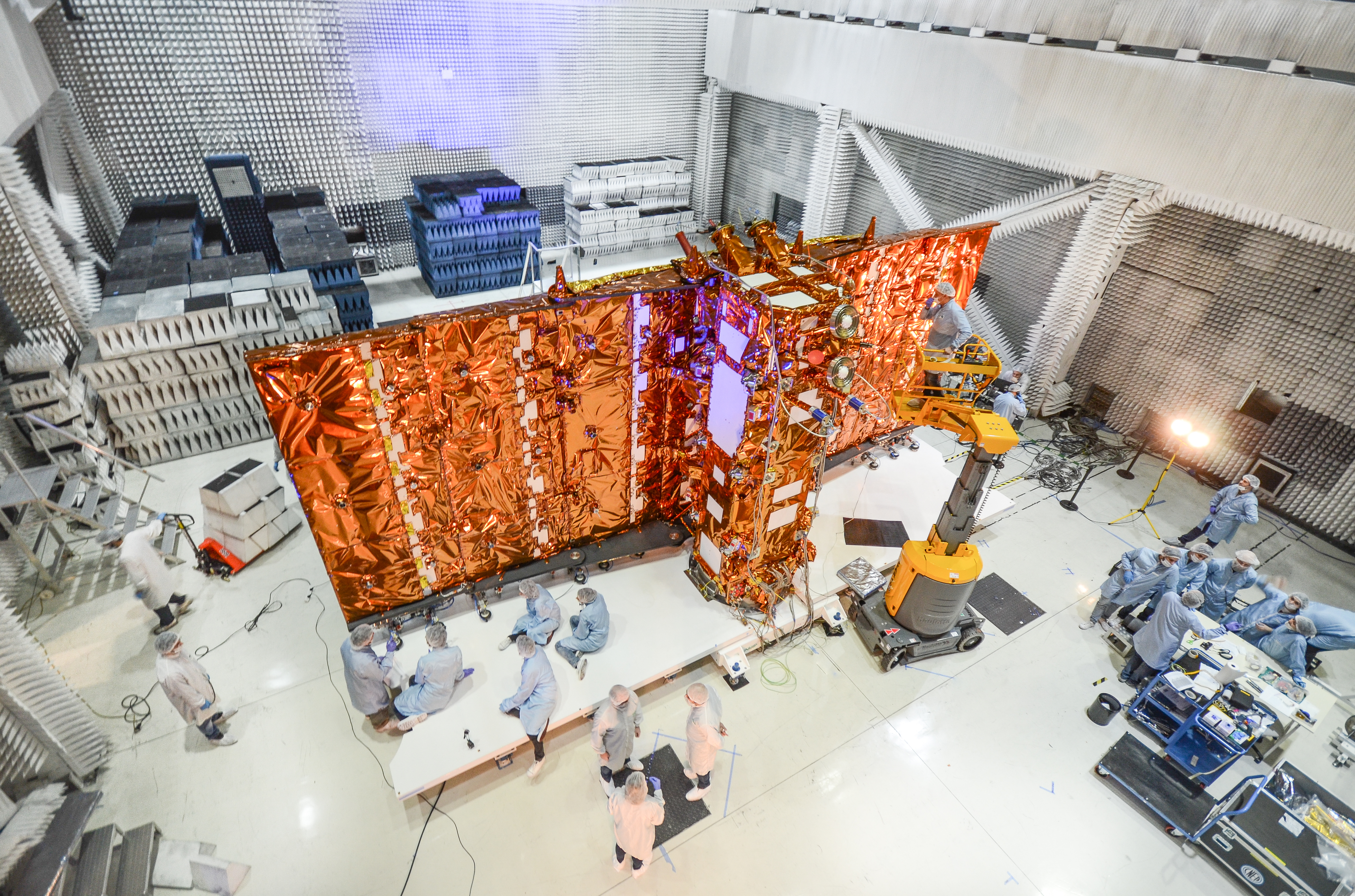
The SAOCOM 1A inside the facilities of CEATSA

Despite a modest budget and numerous setbacks, academics and the sciences have enjoyed international respect since the 1900s, when Luis Agote devised the first safe and effective means of blood transfusion. Argentine scientists are still on the cutting edge in fields such as nanotechnology, physics, computer sciences, molecular biology, oncology, ecology and cardiology. Juan Maldacena, an Argentine-American scientist, is a leading figure in string theory.

Space research has become increasingly active. Argentine-built satellites include LUSAT-1 (1990), Víctor-1 (1996), PEHUENSAT-1 (2007), and two developed by the National Space Activities Commission (CONAE). Argentina has its own satellite programme, nuclear power station designs (4th generation) and public nuclear energy company INVAP, which provides several countries with nuclear reactors.

In 2009, CONAE secured an agreement with the European Space Agency for the installation of a 35-m diametre antenna and other mission support facilities at the Pierre Auger Observatory, the world's foremost cosmic ray observatory. The facility contributes to numerous ESA space probes, as well as CONAE's own, domestic research projects. Argentina was ranked 76th in the Global Innovation Index in 2024 and was ranked 77th in 2025.

== Demographics ==
A map of Argentina's population density, 2022

The 2022 census [INDEC] counted 46,044,703 inhabitants, up from 40,117,096 in 2010. The population in 2024 is estimated to have increased to 47,067,441 inhabitants. Argentina ranks third in South America in total population, fourth in Latin America and 33rd globally. Its population density of 15 persons per square kilometre of land area is well below the world average of 50 persons. The population growth rate in 2010 was an estimated 1.03% annually, with a birth rate of 17.7 live births per 1,000 inhabitants and a mortality rate of 7.4 deaths per 1,000 inhabitants. Since 2010, the crude net migration rate has ranged from below zero to up to four immigrants per 1,000 inhabitants per year.

Argentina is in the midst of a demographic transition to an older and slower-growing population. The proportion of people under 15 is 25.6%, a little below the world average of 28%, and the proportion of people 65 and older is relatively high at 10.8%. This above the world average of 7%. The 2023 birth rate of 1.3 children per woman was considerably below the high of 7.0 children born per woman in 1895. In 2015, the median age was 31.9 years, and life expectancy at birth was 77.14 years.

Attitudes towards LGBT people are generally positive. In 2010, Argentina became the first country in Latin America, the second in the Americas, and the tenth worldwide to legalise same-sex marriage.

=== Urbanisation ===
Argentina is highly urbanised, with 92% of its population living in cities: the ten largest metropolitan areas account for half of the population. About 3 million people live in Buenos Aires. The Buenos Aires metropolitan area has around 13 million, making it one of the largest urban areas in the world. The metropolitan areas of Córdoba and Rosario have around 1.3 million inhabitants each. Mendoza, San Miguel de Tucumán, La Plata, Mar del Plata, Salta and Santa Fe have at least half a million people each.

The population is unequally distributed: about 60% live in the Pampas region (21% of the total area), including 15 million people in Buenos Aires province. The provinces of Córdoba and Santa Fe, and the city of Buenos Aires have 3 million each. Seven other provinces have over one million people each: Mendoza, Tucumán, Entre Ríos, Salta, Chaco, Corrientes and Misiones. With 64.3 inhabitants per square kilometre (167/sq mi), Tucumán is the only Argentine province more densely populated than the world average. By contrast, the southern province of Santa Cruz has around 1.1/km^{2} (2.8/sq mi).

Largest cities or towns in Argentina (2025 INDEC metro area estimate)
Rank	Name	Province	Pop.	Rank	Name	Province	Pop.
1	Buenos Aires	(Autonomous city)	3,006,000	11	Resistencia	Chaco	427,000
2	Córdoba	Córdoba	1,609,000	12	Santiago del Estero	Santiago del Estero	419,000
3	Rosario	Santa Fe	1,360,000	13	Corrientes	Corrientes	394,000
4	Mendoza	Mendoza	1,063,000	14	Posadas	Misiones	393,000
5	La Plata	Buenos Aires	942,000	15	San Salvador de Jujuy	Jujuy	362,000
6	San Miguel de Tucumán	Tucumán	929,000	16	Neuquén	Neuquén	326,000
7	Salta	Salta	672,000	17	Bahía Blanca	Buenos Aires	323,000
8	Mar del Plata	Buenos Aires	669,000	18	Paraná	Entre Ríos	288,000
9	San Juan	San Juan	559,000	19	Formosa	Formosa	265,000
10	Santa Fe	Santa Fe	554,000	20	Comodoro Rivadavia	Chubut	258,000

=== Ethnography ===
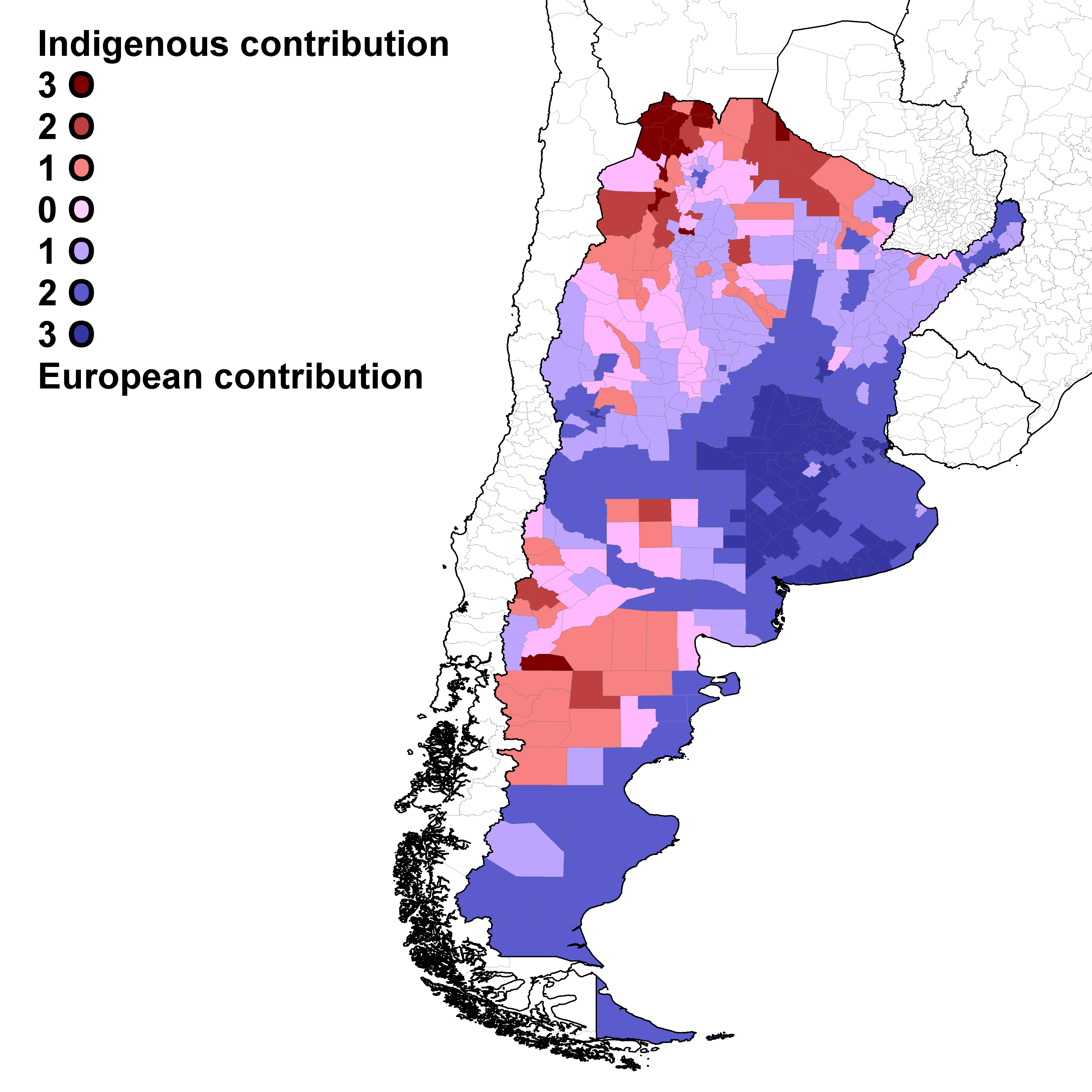
A map of the proportion of European and indigenous ancestry in Argentina

Argentina is considered a country of immigrants. Argentines usually refer to the country as a crisol de razas (crucible of races, or melting pot). A 2010 study conducted on 218 individuals by Argentine geneticist Daniel Corach established that the average genetic ancestry of Argentines is 79% European (mainly Italian and Spanish), 18% indigenous and 4.3% African. 63.6% of the tested group had at least one ancestor who was indigenous. The majority of Argentines descend from multiple European ethnic groups, primarily of Italian and Spanish descent, with over 25 million Argentines, almost 60% of the population, having some partial Italian origins.

Argentina is home to a notable Asian population, the majority of whom are descended from either West Asians, namely Lebanese and Syrians, or East Asians, such as the Chinese, Koreans, and the Japanese. The latter of whom number around 180,000 individuals. The total number of Arab Argentines (most of whom are of Lebanese or Syrian origin) is estimated to be 1.3 to 3.5 million. Many immigrated from Asian countries to Argentina during the latter half of 19th century, and the first half of the 20th century. Most Arab Argentines belong to the Catholic Church, including both the Latin Church and the Eastern Catholic Churches, or the Eastern Orthodox Church. A minority are Muslims. In 2018, there were 180,000 Alawites in Argentina.

Since the 1970s, immigration has mostly been coming from Bolivia, Paraguay and Peru, with smaller numbers from the Dominican Republic, Ecuador and Romania. In 2008, the government estimated that 750,000 inhabitants lack official documents and has launched a programme to encourage illegal immigrants to declare their status in return for two-year residence visas—so far over 670,000 applications have been processed under the programme. As of July 2023, more than 18,500 Russians have come to Argentina after the Russian invasion of Ukraine in 2022.

=== Languages ===
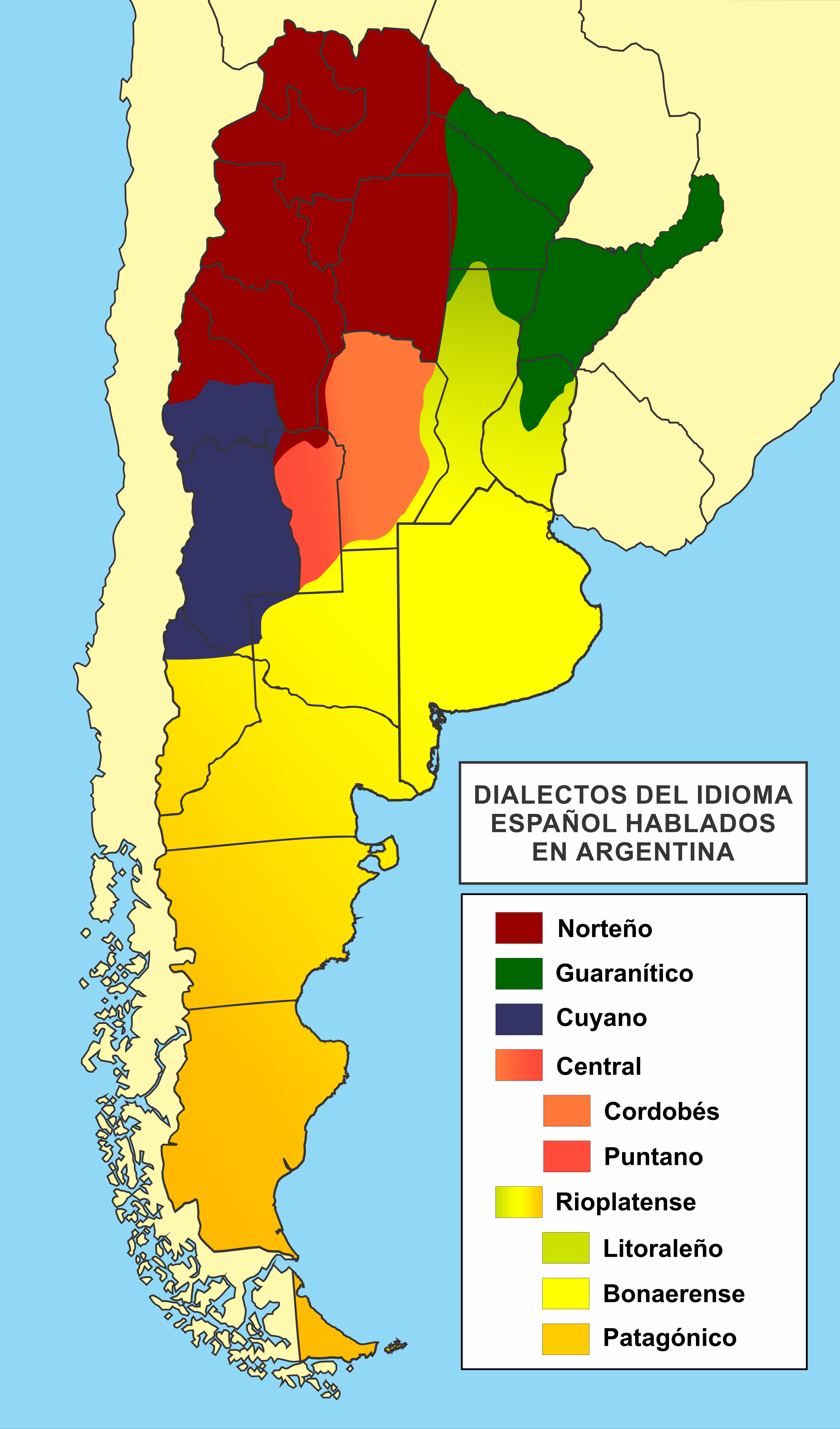
Dialectal variants of the Spanish language in Argentina

The de facto (Note: Though not declared official de jure, the Spanish language is the only one used in the wording of laws, decrees, resolutions, official documents and public acts.) official language is Spanish, spoken by almost all Argentines. Argentina is the largest Spanish-speaking society that universally employs voseo, the use of the pronoun vos instead of tú ("you"), which imposes the use of alternative verb forms as well.

Owing to the extensive Argentine geography, Spanish has a strong variation among regions, although the prevalent dialect is Rioplatense, primarily spoken in the Pampean and Patagonian regions and accented similarly to the Neapolitan language. Italian and other European immigrants influenced Lunfardo—the regional slang—permeating the vernacular vocabulary of other Latin American countries as well.

There are several second languages in widespread use: English (by 2.8 million people); Italian (by 1.5 million people); (Note: Many elder people also speak a macaronic language of Italian and Spanish called cocoliche, which was originated by the Italian immigrants in the late 19th century.) Arabic (specifically its Northern Levantine dialect, by one million people); Standard German (by 200,000 people); (Note: It gave origin to a mixture of Spanish and German called Belgranodeutsch.) Guaraní (by 200,000 people, mostly in Corrientes and Misiones); Catalan (by 174,000 people); Quechua (by 65,000 people, mostly in the Northwest); Wichí (by 53,700 people, mainly in Chaco where, along with Kom and Moqoit, it is official de jure); Vlax Romani (by 52,000 people); Albanian (by 40,000 people); Japanese (by 32,000 people); Aymara (by 30,000 people, mostly in the Northwest); and Ukrainian (by 27,000 people).

In 2026, the town of Caá Catí adopted Guaraní as a co-official language.

=== Religion ===
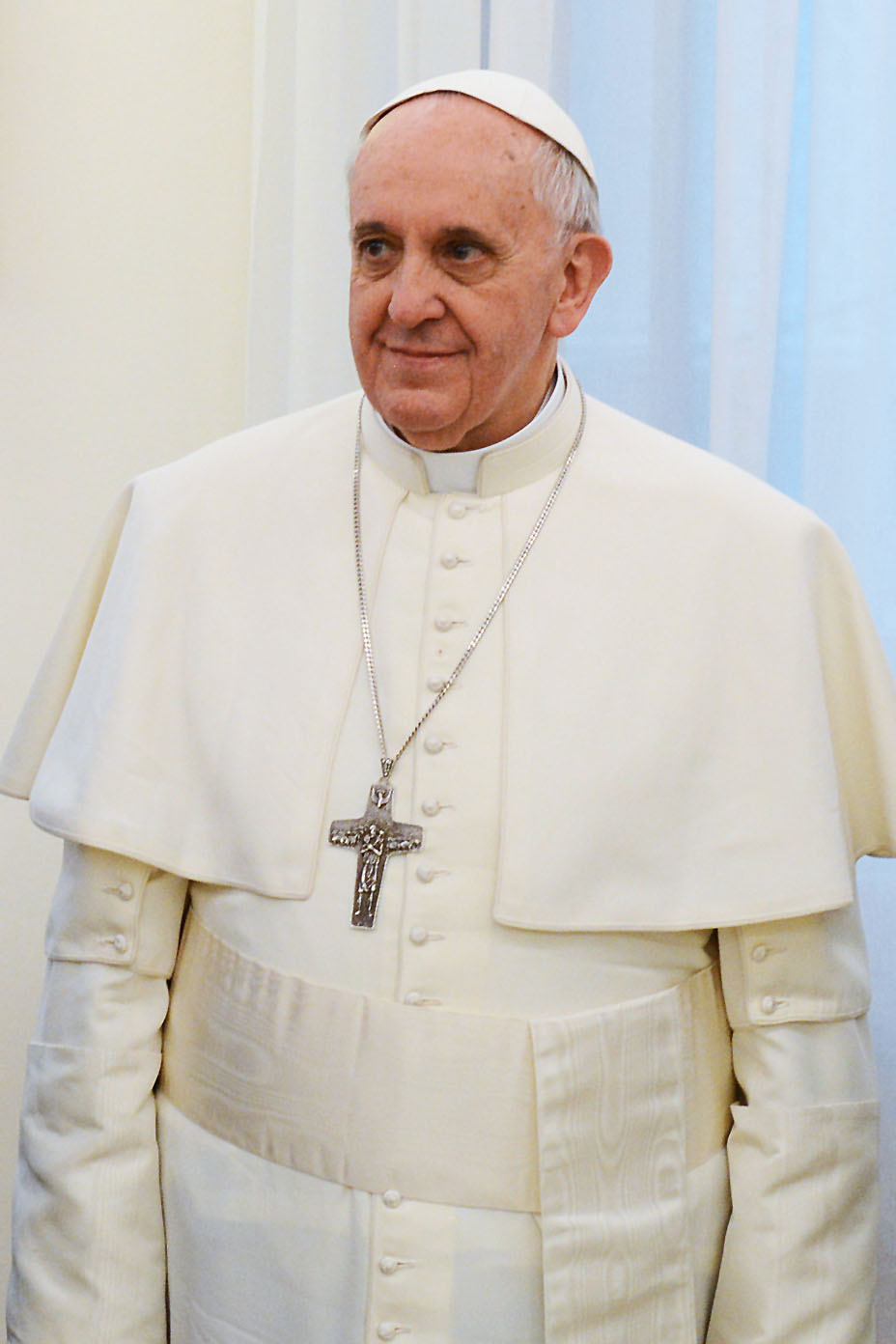
Francis, the first pope from the Americas, was born and raised in Argentina.

Christianity is the largest religion. The constitution guarantees freedom of religion. Although it enforces neither an official nor a state faith, it gives Roman Catholicism a preferential status. (Note: In practice this privileged status amounts to tax-exempt school subsidies and licensing preferences for radio broadcasting frequencies.)

In 2008, Argentines were 76.5% Catholic, 11.3% agnostics and atheists, 9% Evangelical Protestants, 1.2% Jehovah's Witnesses, and 0.9% Mormons, while 1.2% followed other religions, including Islam, Judaism and Buddhism. These figures appear to have changed quite significantly in recent years: in 2017, Catholics were 66% of the population, indicating a drop of 10.5% in nine years, and the nonreligious in the country standing at 21% of the population, indicating an almost doubling over the same period. In 2024, Catholics were 63% of the population. 20% of Argentines are irreligious, 9% are Protestants, and 8% follow another religion or didn't answer.

Argentina is home to both one of the largest Muslim and largest Jewish communities in Latin America, the latter being the seventh most populous in the world. Argentina is a member of the International Holocaust Remembrance Alliance. In 2008, Argentines showed a high level of individualisation and deinstitutionalisation of religious beliefs. In 2008, 23.8% claimed to always attend religious services, 49.1% seldom did and 26.8% never did.

On 13 March 2013, Argentine Jorge Mario Bergoglio, the Cardinal Archbishop of Buenos Aires, was elected Bishop of Rome and Supreme Pontiff of the Catholic Church. He took the name "Francis", and he became the first pope from either the Americas or from the Southern Hemisphere. He is the first pope born outside of Europe since the election of Pope Gregory III, who was Syrian, in 741.

=== Education ===
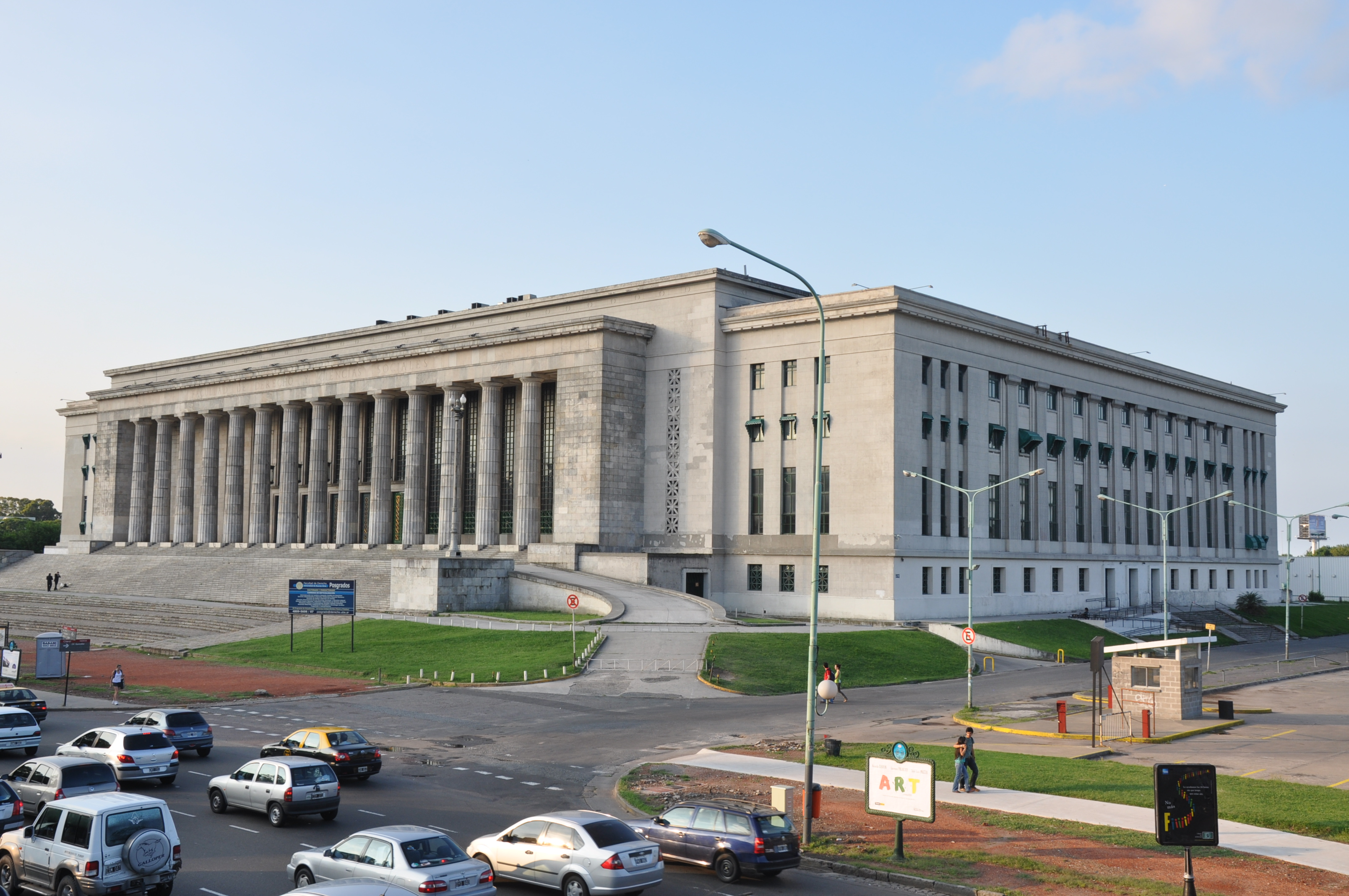
Faculty of Law of the University of Buenos Aires

The Argentine education system consists of four levels. An initial level for children between 45 days to 5 years old, with the last two years being compulsory. An elementary or lower school mandatory level lasting 6 or 7 years. (Note: Level duration depends on jurisdiction.) In 2010, the literacy rate was 98.07%. A secondary or high school mandatory level lasts 5 or 6 years. In 2010, 38.5% of people over age 20 had completed secondary school. Higher education is divided into tertiary, university and post-graduate sub-levels. In 2013, there were 47 national public universities across the country, and 46 private ones.

In 2010, 7.1% of people over age 20 had graduated from university. The public universities of Buenos Aires, Córdoba, La Plata, Rosario, and the National Technological University are some of the most important. The state guarantees universal, secular and free-of-charge public education for all levels. (Note: The post-graduate sub-level of higher education is usually paid.) Responsibility for educational supervision is organised at the federal and individual provincial states. In the last decades the role of the private sector has grown across all educational stages.

=== Health ===
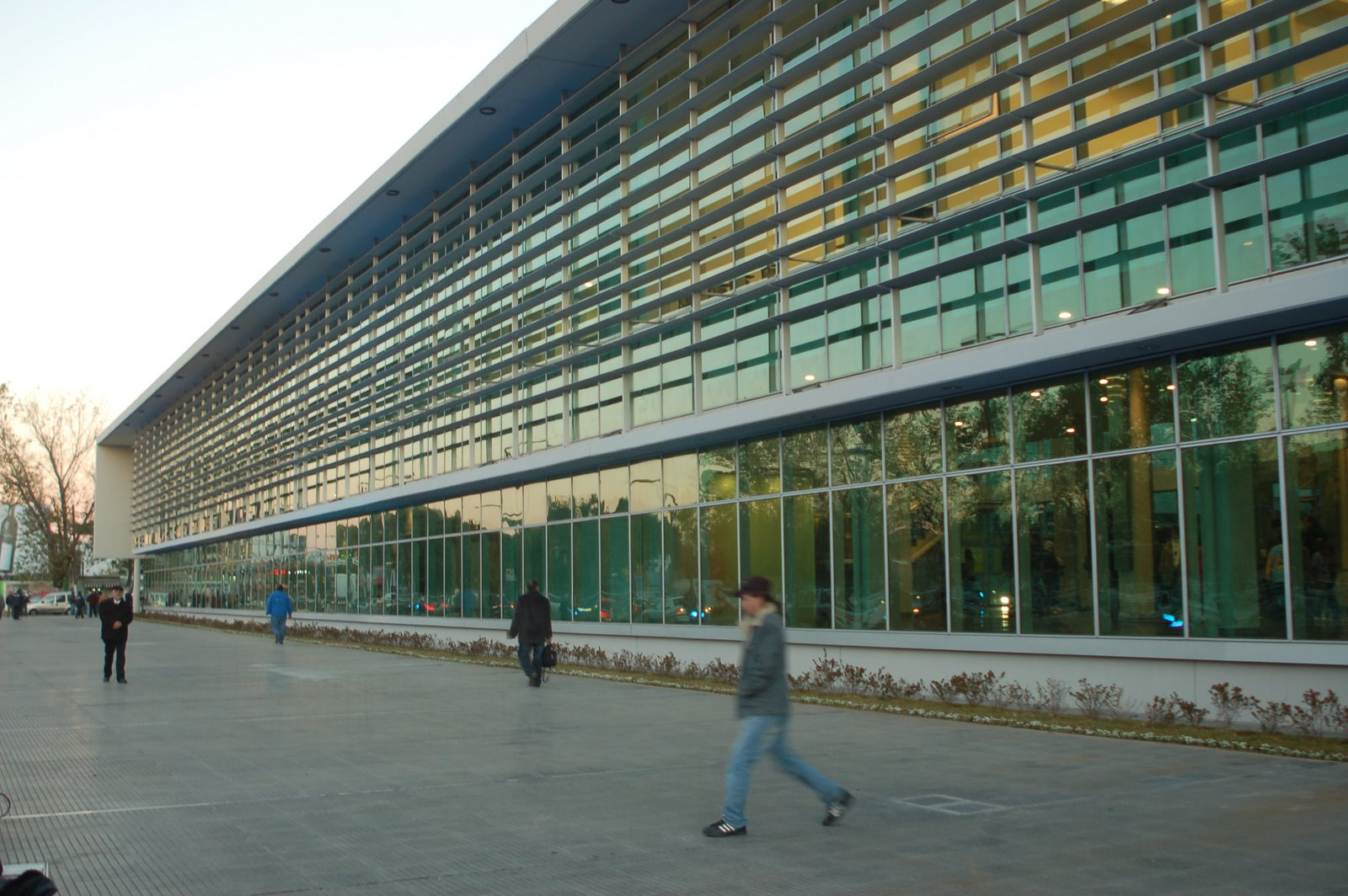
Clemente Álvarez Emergency Hospital in Rosario

Healthcare is provided through a combination of employer and labour union-sponsored plans (Obras Sociales), government insurance plans, public hospitals and clinics and through private health insurance plans. Healthcare cooperatives number over 300 (of which 200 are related to labour unions) and provide healthcare for half the population; the national INSSJP (popularly known as PAMI) covers nearly all of the five million senior citizens.

There are more than 153,000 hospital beds, 121,000 physicians and 37,000 dentists, ratios comparable to developed nations. The relatively high access to medical care has historically resulted in mortality patterns and trends similar to developed nations': from 1953 to 2005, deaths from cardiovascular disease increased from 20% to 23% of the total, those from tumours from 14% to 20%, respiratory problems from 7% to 14%, digestive maladies (non-infectious) from 7% to 11%, strokes a steady 7%, injuries, 6%, and infectious diseases, 4%. Causes related to senility led to many of the rest. Infant deaths have fallen from 19% of all deaths in 1953 to 3% in 2005.

The availability of healthcare has also reduced infant mortality from 70 per 1,000 live births in 1948 to 12.1 in 2009 and raised life expectancy at birth from 60 years to 76. Though these figures compare favourably with global averages, they fall short of levels in developed nations. In 2006, Argentina ranked fourth in Latin America.

== Culture ==
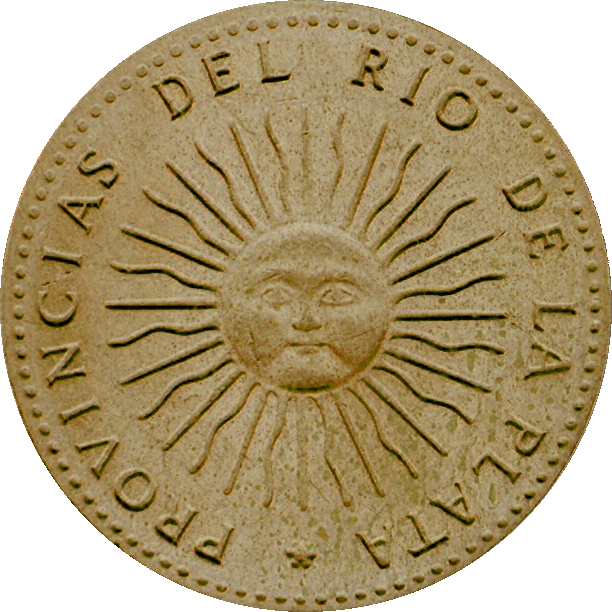
The Sun of May on the first Argentine coin, 1813

Argentina is a multicultural country with significant European influences. Modern Argentine culture has been largely influenced by Italian, Spanish and other European immigration from France, Russia, United Kingdom, among others. Its cities are largely characterised by both the prevalence of people of European descent, and of conscious imitation of American and European styles in fashion, architecture and design.

Museums, cinemas, and galleries are abundant in all the large urban centres, as well as traditional establishments such as literary bars, or bars offering live music of a variety of genres although there are lesser elements of Amerindian and African influences, particularly in the fields of music and art. The other big influence is the gauchos and their traditional country lifestyle of self-reliance. Indigenous American traditions have been absorbed into the general cultural milieu. Argentine writer Ernesto Sabato reflects on the nature of the culture:

With the primitive Hispanic American reality fractured in La Plata Basin due to immigration, its inhabitants have come to be somewhat dual with all the dangers but also with all the advantages of that condition: because of our European roots, we deeply link the nation with the enduring values of the Old World; because of our condition of Americans we link ourselves to the rest of the continent, through the folklore of the interior and the old Castilian that unifies us, feeling somehow the vocation of the Patria Grande San Martín and Bolívar once imagined.

— Ernesto Sabato, La cultura en la encrucijada nacional (1976)

=== Literature ===
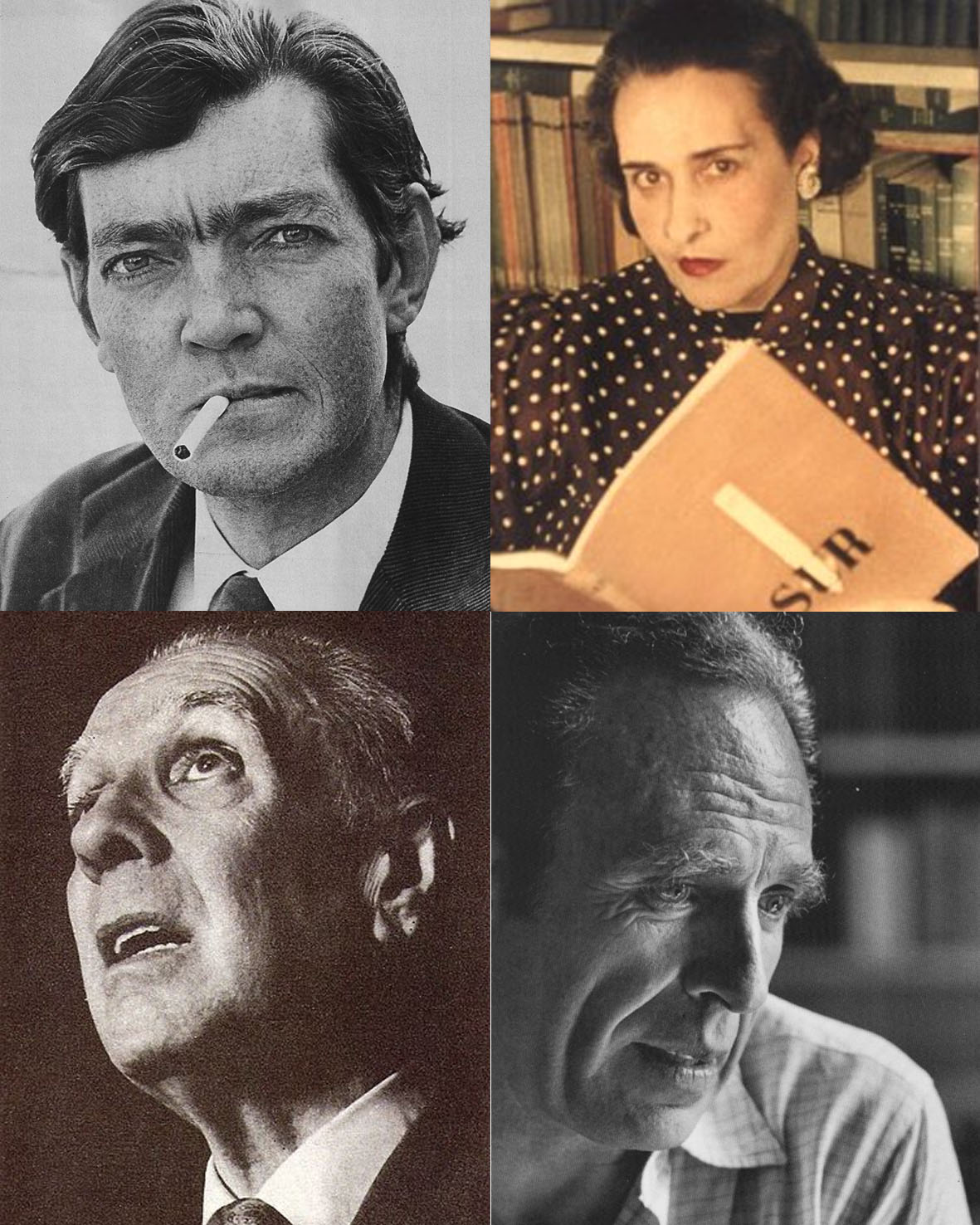
Four Argentine writers. Top left to bottom right: Julio Cortázar, Victoria Ocampo, Jorge Luis Borges, and Adolfo Bioy Casares.

Although Argentina's literary history began around 1550, it reached full independence with Esteban Echeverría's El Matadero, a romantic landmark that played a significant role in the development of 19th century's Argentine narrative, split by the ideological divide between the popular, federalist epic of José Hernández' Martín Fierro and the elitist and cultured discourse of Sarmiento's masterpiece, Facundo.

The Modernist movement advanced into the 20th century including exponents such as Leopoldo Lugones and poet Alfonsina Storni; it was followed by Vanguardism, with Ricardo Güiraldes's Don Segundo Sombra as an important reference. Jorge Luis Borges, Argentina's most acclaimed writer and one of the foremost figures in the history of literature, found new ways of looking at the modern world in metaphor and philosophical debate and his influence has extended to authors all over the globe. Short story collections such as Ficciones and The Aleph are among his most famous works. He was a friend and collaborator of Adolfo Bioy Casares, who wrote one of the most praised science fiction novels, The Invention of Morel. Julio Cortázar, one of the leading members of the Latin American Boom and a major name in 20th-century literature, influenced an entire generation of writers in the Americas and Europe.

A remarkable episode is the social and literarial dialectica between the so-called Florida group, named this way because its members used to meet together at Confitería Richmond at Florida Street and published in the Martín Fierro magazine, such as Jorge Luis Borges, Leopoldo Marechal, Antonio Berni (artist), among others; versus the Boedo group of Roberto Arlt, César Tiempo, Homero Manzi (tango composer), that used to meet at the Café El Japonés and published their works with the Editorial Claridad, with both the cafe and the publisher located at Boedo Avenue.

Other highly regarded writers, poets and essayists include Estanislao del Campo, Eugenio Cambaceres, Pedro Bonifacio Palacios, Hugo Wast, Benito Lynch, Enrique Banchs, Oliverio Girondo, Ezequiel Martínez Estrada, Victoria Ocampo, Leopoldo Marechal, Silvina Ocampo, Roberto Arlt, Eduardo Mallea, Manuel Mujica Láinez, Ernesto Sábato, Silvina Bullrich, Rodolfo Walsh, María Elena Walsh, Tomás Eloy Martínez, Manuel Puig, Alejandra Pizarnik, and Osvaldo Soriano.

=== Music ===
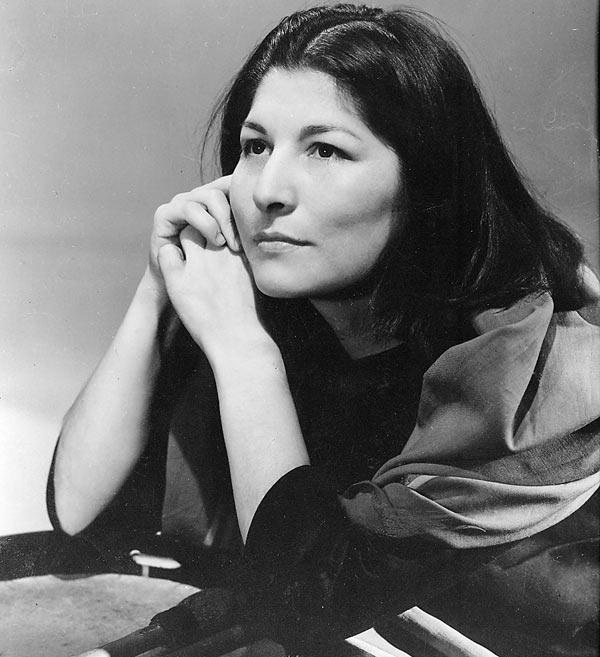
A photograph of Mercedes Sosa by Annemarie Heinrich

Tango, a Rioplatense musical genre with European and African influences, is one of Argentina's international cultural symbols. The golden age of tango, from 1930 to the mid-1950s, mirrored that of jazz and swing in the United States, featuring large orchestras such as those of Osvaldo Pugliese, Aníbal Troilo, Francisco Canaro, Julio de Caro and Juan d'Arienzo. After 1955, virtuoso Astor Piazzolla popularised Nuevo tango, a subtler and more intellectual trend for the genre. Tango enjoys worldwide popularity nowadays with groups such as Gotan Project, Bajofondo and Tanghetto.

Argentina developed strong classical music and dance scenes that gave rise to renowned artists such as Alberto Ginastera, composer; Alberto Lysy, violinist; Martha Argerich and Eduardo Delgado, pianists; Daniel Barenboim, pianist and symphonic orchestra director; José Cura and Marcelo Álvarez, tenors; and to ballet dancers Jorge Donn, José Neglia, Norma Fontenla, Maximiliano Guerra, Paloma Herrera, Marianela Núñez, Iñaki Urlezaga and Julio Bocca.

A national folk style emerged in the 1930s from dozens of regional musical genres and went on to influence the entirety of Latin American music. Some of its interpreters, such as Atahualpa Yupanqui and Mercedes Sosa, achieved worldwide acclaim. The romantic ballad genre included singers of international fame such as Sandro de América. Tenor saxophonist Leandro "Gato" Barbieri and composer and big band conductor Lalo Schifrin are among the most internationally successful jazz musicians.

Argentine rock developed as a distinct musical style in the mid-1960s, when Buenos Aires and Rosario became cradles of aspiring musicians. Founding bands such as Los Gatos, Sui Generis, Almendra and Manal were followed by Seru Giran, Los Abuelos de la Nada, Soda Stereo and Patricio Rey y sus Redonditos de Ricota, with prominent artists including Gustavo Cerati, Litto Nebbia, Andrés Calamaro, Luis Alberto Spinetta, Charly García, Fito Páez and León Gieco.

A dance and a musical genre popular at present is Cachengue, a subgenre of Argentine cumbia and reggaeton spreading in popularity in nearby countries such as Uruguay, Chile, Paraguay, and Bolivia.

=== Theatre and cinema ===
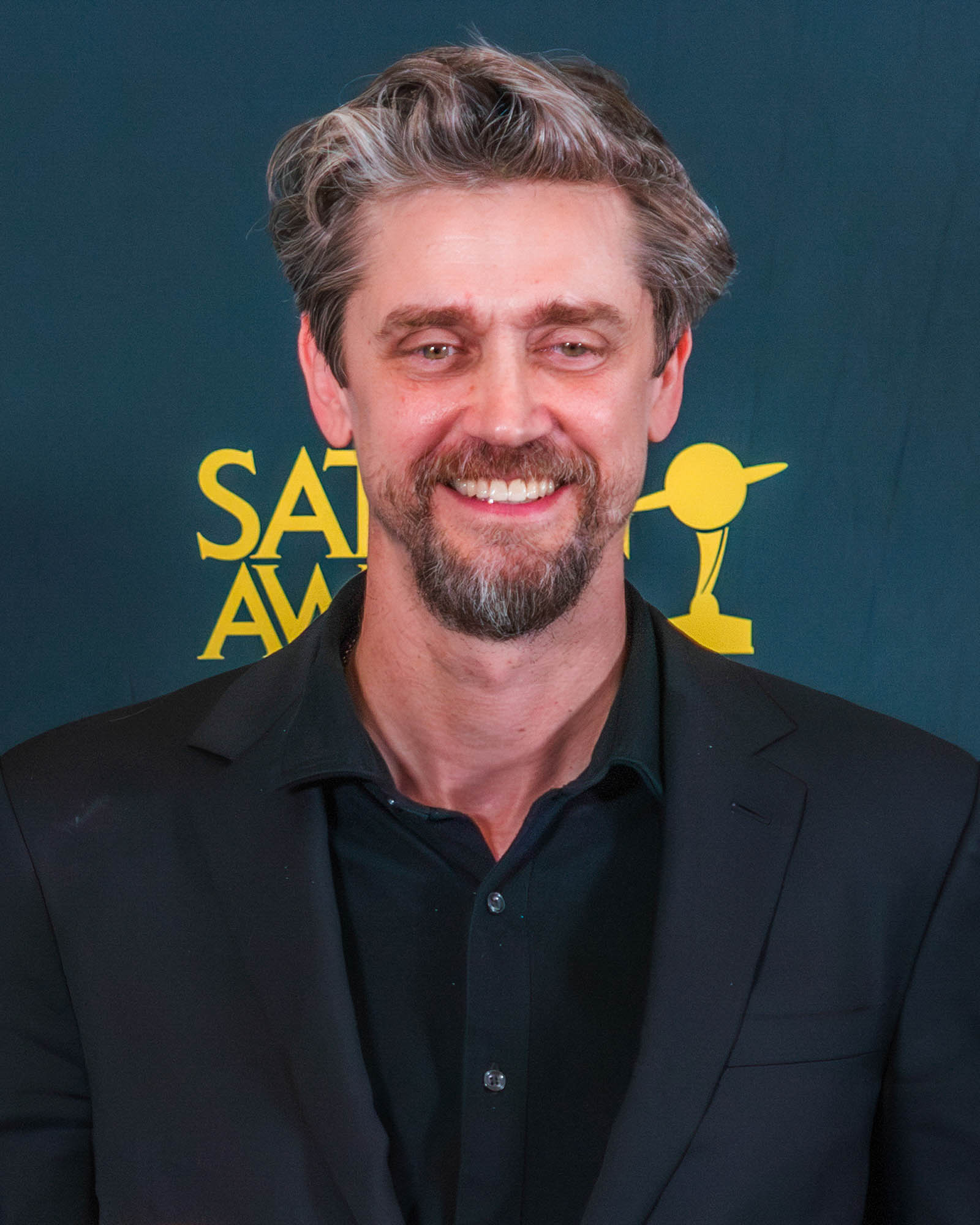
Andy Muschietti, director of It, the highest-grossing horror film of all time.

Buenos Aires is one of the great theatre capitals of the world, with a scene of international calibre centred on Corrientes Avenue, "the street that never sleeps", sometimes referred to as the Broadway of Buenos Aires. Teatro Colón is a global landmark for opera and classical performances; its acoustics are considered among the world's top five. (Note: The other top venues being Berlin's Konzerthaus, Vienna's Musikverein, Amsterdam's Concertgebouw and Boston's Symphony Hall.)

The Argentine film industry has historically been one of the three most developed in Latin American cinema, along with those produced in Mexico and Brazil. It started in 1896. By the early 1930s, it was Latin America's leading film producer, a place it kept until the early 1950s. The world's first animated feature films were made and released in Argentina, by cartoonist Quirino Cristiani, in 1917 and 1918.

Argentine films have achieved worldwide recognition: Argentina has won two Academy Awards for Best Foreign Language Film, for The Official Story (1985) and The Secret in Their Eyes (2009). Argentine composers Luis Enrique Bacalov and Gustavo Santaolalla have been honoured with Academy Awards for Best Original Score, and Armando Bó and Nicolás Giacobone shared in the Academy Award for Best Original Screenplay for 2014.

The Argentine French actress Bérénice Bejo received a nomination for the Academy Award for Best Supporting Actress in 2011 and won the César Award for Best Actress and won the Best Actress award in the Cannes Film Festival for her role in the film The Past. Argentina has won seventeen Goya Awards for Best Spanish Language Foreign Film, being by far the most awarded country in Latin America with twenty-four nominations. Many other Argentine films have been acclaimed by international critique. In 2013, about 100 full-length motion pictures were being created annually.

=== Visual arts and architecture ===
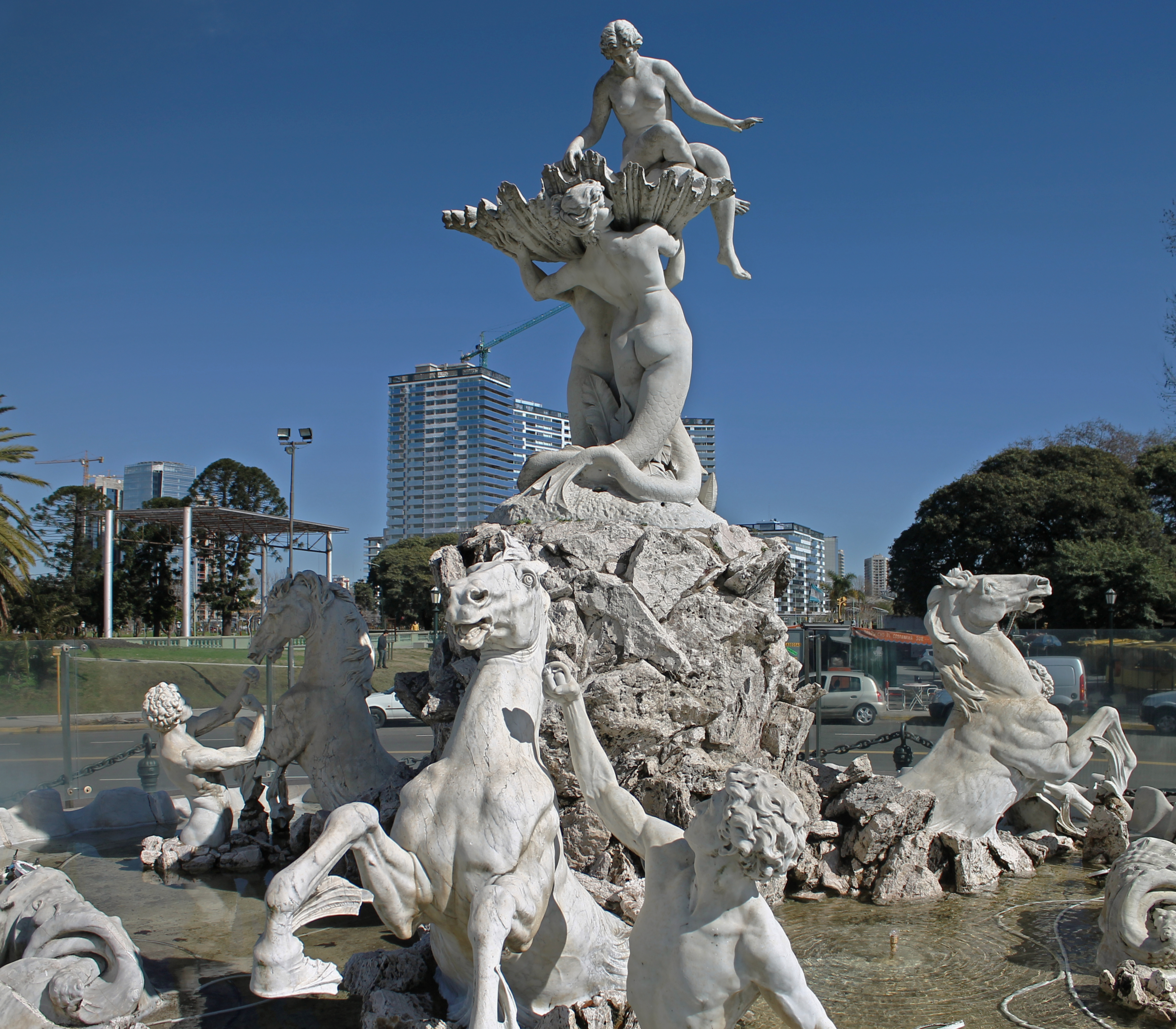
Las Nereidas Font by Lola Mora

Some of the best-known painters are Cándido López and Florencio Molina Campos (Naïve style); Ernesto de la Cárcova and Eduardo Sívori (Realism); Fernando Fader (Impressionism); Pío Collivadino, Atilio Malinverno and Cesáreo Bernaldo de Quirós (Postimpressionism); Emilio Pettoruti (Cubism); Julio Barragán (Concretism and Cubism) Antonio Berni (Neofigurativism); Roberto Aizenberg and Xul Solar (Surrealism); Gyula Košice (Constructivism); Eduardo Mac Entyre (Generative art); Luis Seoane, Carlos Torrallardona, Luis Aquino, Alfredo Gramajo Gutiérrez (Modernism); Lucio Fontana (Spatialism); Tomás Maldonado, Guillermo Kuitca (Abstract art); León Ferrari, Marta Minujín (Conceptual art); Gustavo Cabral (Fantasy art), and Fabián Pérez (Neoemotionalism).

In 1946, Gyula Košice and others created the Madí movement, which spread to Europe and the United States, where it had a significant impact. Tomás Maldonado was one of the main theorists of the Ulm Model of design education, still highly influential globally. Other artists of worldwide fame include Adolfo Bellocq, whose lithographs have been influential since the 1920s, and Benito Quinquela Martín, the quintessential port painter, inspired by the immigrant-bound La Boca neighbourhood. Internationally laureate sculptors Erminio Blotta, Lola Mora and Rogelio Yrurtia authored many of the classical evocative monuments of the Argentine cityscape.

Colonisation brought the Spanish Baroque architecture, which can still be appreciated in its simpler Rioplatense style in the reduction of San Ignacio Miní, the Cathedral of Córdoba, and the Cabildo of Luján. Italian and French influences increased at the beginning of the 19th century with strong eclectic overtones that gave the local architecture a unique feeling.

=== Mass media ===
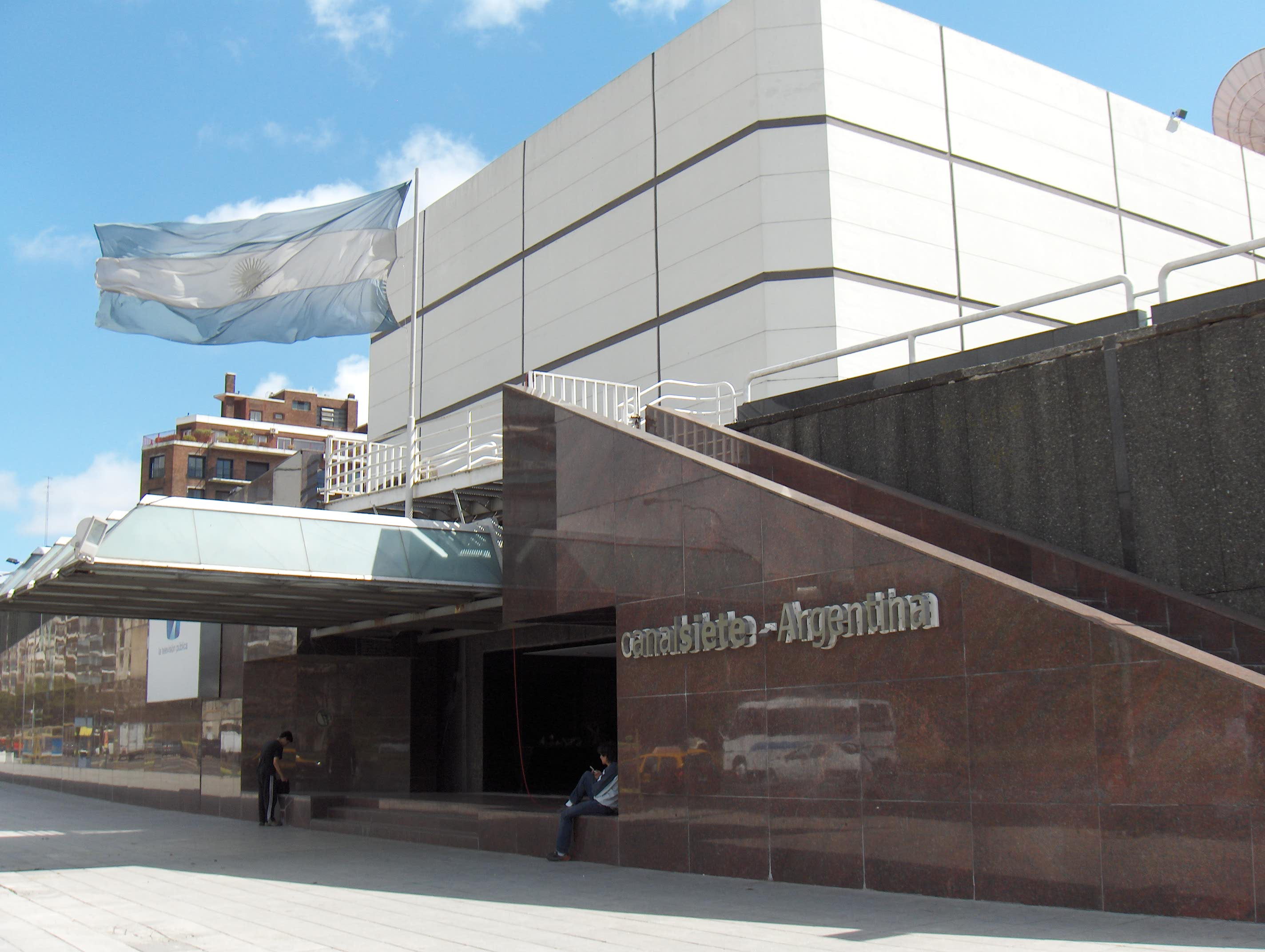
The headquarters of the Channel 7, the first television station in Argentina

The print media industry is highly developed, with more than 200 newspapers. The major national ones include Clarín (centrist, Latin America's best-seller and the second most widely circulated in the Spanish-speaking world), La Nación (centre-right), Página/12 (leftist), La Voz del Interior (centre).

Argentina began the world's first regular radio broadcasting on 27 August 1920, when Richard Wagner's Parsifal was aired by a team of medical students led by Enrique Telémaco Susini in Buenos Aires' Teatro Coliseo. In 2002, there were 260 AM and 1150 FM registered radio stations in Argentina.

The Argentine television industry is large, diverse and popular across Latin America, with many productions and TV formats having been exported abroad. Since 1999 Argentines have enjoyed the highest availability of cable and satellite television in Latin America. In 2014, 87.4% of households had access, a rate similar to those in the United States, Canada and Europe. As of early 2024, internet penetration stood at 88.4% of the population, and the ratio of cellular mobile connections to the population was 135.3% (62.14 million active connections).

=== Cuisine ===
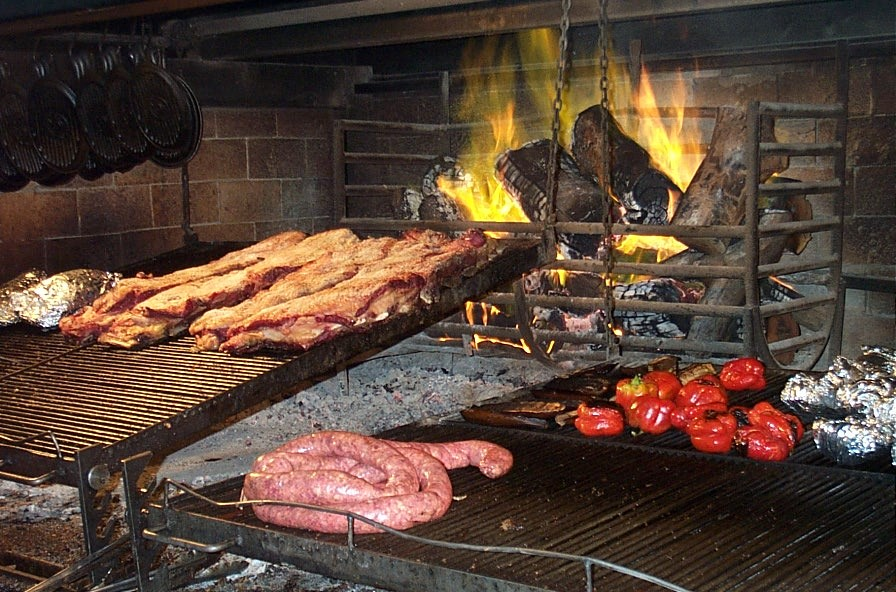
Argentine beef as asado

Besides many of the pasta, sausage and dessert dishes common to continental Europe, Argentines enjoy a wide variety of Indigenous and Criollo creations, including empanadas (a small stuffed pastry), locro (a mixture of corn, beans, meat, bacon, onion, and gourd), humita and mate.

The country has the highest consumption of red meat in the world, traditionally prepared as asado, the Argentine barbecue. It is made with various types of meats, often including chorizo, sweetbread, chitterlings, and blood sausage.

Common desserts include facturas (Viennese-style pastry), cakes and pancakes filled with dulce de leche (a sort of milk caramel jam), alfajores (shortbread cookies sandwiched together with chocolate, dulce de leche or a fruit paste), and tortas fritas (fried cakes)

Argentine wine, one of the world's finest, is an integral part of the local menu. Malbec, Torrontés, Cabernet Sauvignon, Syrah and Chardonnay are some of the most sought-after varieties.

=== Sport ===
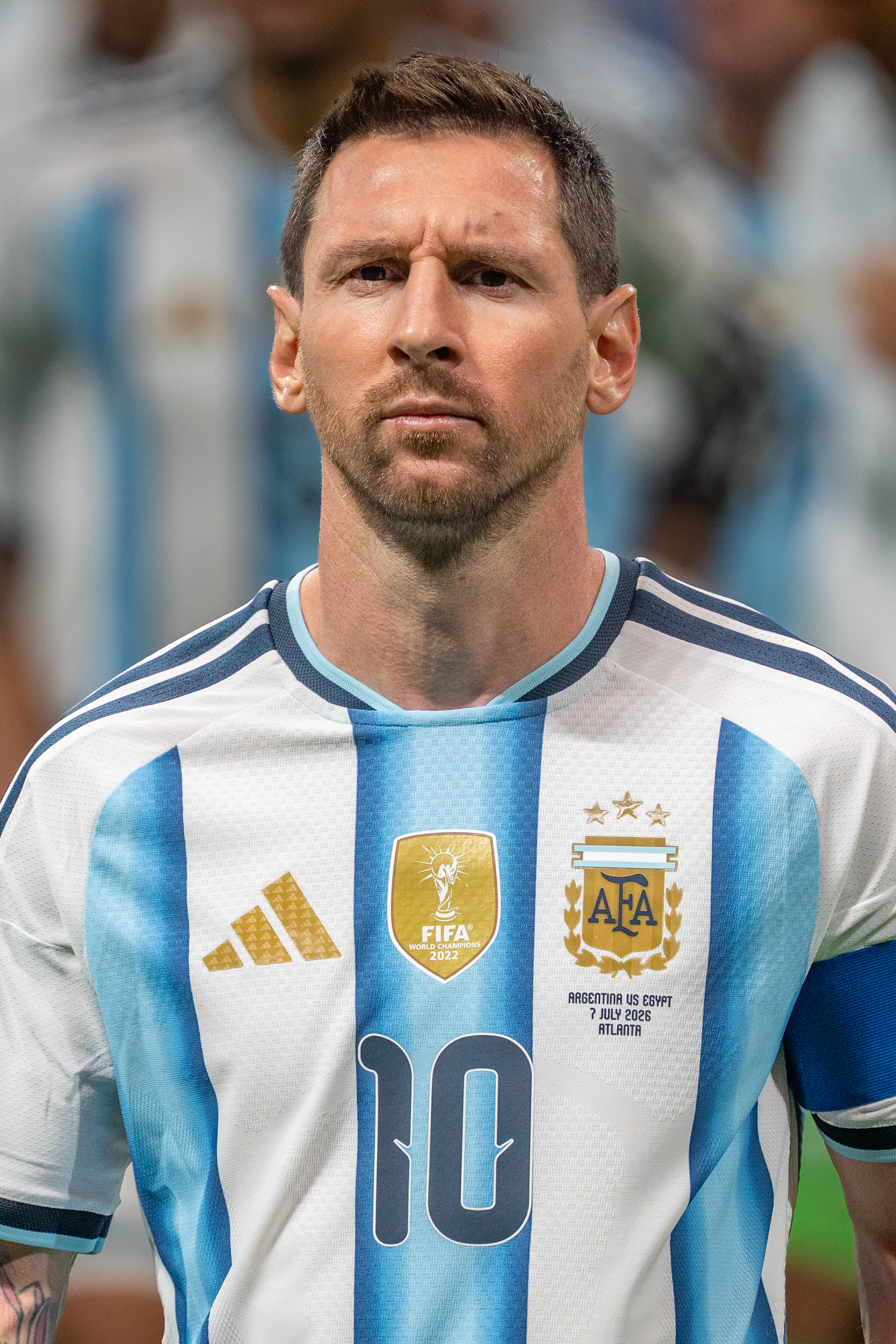
Footballer Lionel Messi, eight-time Ballon d'Or winner, has the most appareances of the Argentina national football team and is the team's top-scorer before retiring from international football on the 6 October 2026 at 39 years old.

Pato is the national sport, an ancient horseback game locally originated in the early 1600s and predecessor of horseball. The most popular sport is football. Along with Brazil, Germany and France, the men's national team is the only one to have won each of the World Cup (in 1978, 1986 and 2022), Confederations Cup, and the Olympic gold. They have also won 16 Copa Américas, 7 Pan American Gold Medals and many other trophies. Alfredo Di Stéfano, Diego Maradona and Lionel Messi are widely considered to be among the best players in the game's history.

The women's field hockey team Las Leonas, is one of the world's most successful with four Olympic medals, two World Cups, a World League and seven Champions Trophy. Luciana Aymar is recognised as the best female player in the history of the sport, being the only player to have received the FIH Player of the Year Award eight times.

The men's national basketball team is the only one in the FIBA Americas zone that has won the quintuplet crown: World Championship, Olympic Gold Medal, Diamond Ball, Americas Championship, and Pan American Gold Medal. It has also conquered 13 South American Championships, and many other tournaments. Emanuel Ginóbili, Luis Scola, Andrés Nocioni, Fabricio Oberto, Pablo Prigioni, Carlos Delfino and Juan Ignacio Sánchez are a few of the country's most acclaimed players, all of them part of the NBA. Argentina hosted the Basketball World Cup in 1950 and 1990.

As of 2017, the men's national rugby team, known as 'Los Pumas' has competed at the Rugby World Cup each time it has been held, achieving their highest-ever result in 2007 when they came third. Since 2012, the Los Pumas have competed against Australia, New Zealand & South Africa in The Rugby Championship, the premier international Rugby competition in the Southern Hemisphere. Since 2009 the secondary men's national team known as the 'Jaguares' has competed against the US, Canada, and Uruguay first teams in the Americas Rugby Championship, which Los Jaguares have won six out of eight times it has taken place.

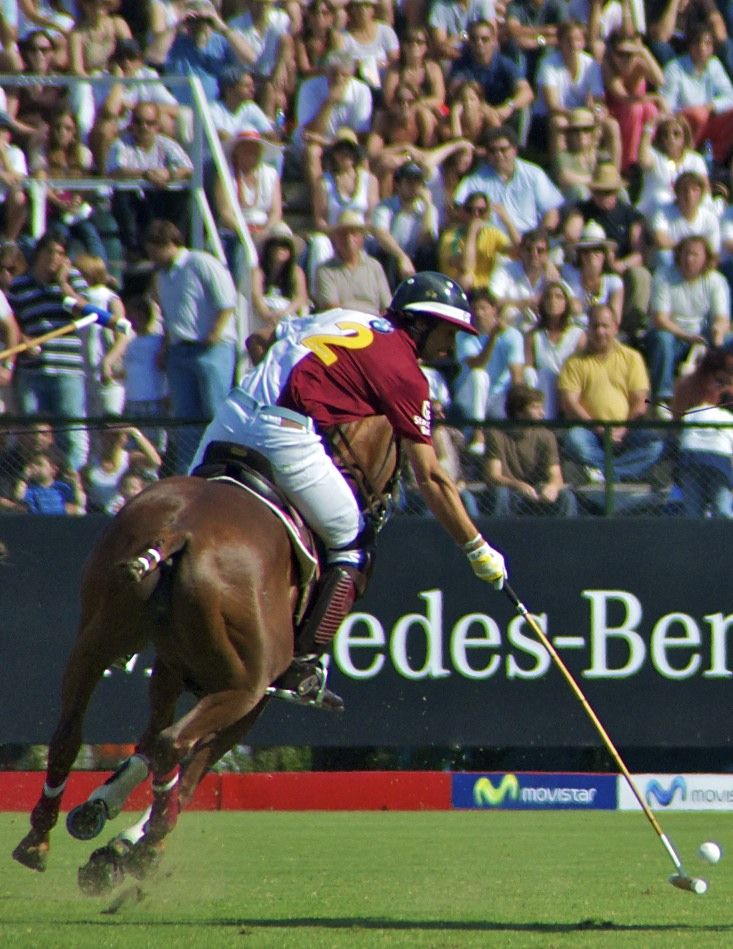
Argentine Polo Open Championship

Argentina has produced some of the most formidable champions for boxing, including Carlos Monzón, the best middleweight in history; Pascual Pérez, one of the most decorated flyweight boxers of all times; Horacio Accavallo, the former WBA and WBC world flyweight champion; Víctor Galíndez, as of 2009, record holder for consecutive world light heavyweight title defences and Nicolino Locche, nicknamed "The Untouchable" for his masterful defence; they are all inductees into the International Boxing Hall of Fame.

Guillermo Vilas is the greatest Latin American tennis player of the Open Era, while Gabriela Sabatini is the most accomplished Argentine female player of all time—having reached number 3 in the WTA ranking, are both inductees into the International Tennis Hall of Fame. Argentina has won the World Team Cup four times, in 1980, 2002, 2007 and 2010 and has reached the semifinals of the Davis Cup 7 times in the last 10 years, losing the finals against Russia in 2006 and Spain in 2008 and 2011; the Argentine team also played the final in 1981, where they lost against the United States. The national squad won the 2016 Davis Cup.

Argentina reigns undisputed in polo, having won more international championships than any other country and been seldom beaten since the 1930s. The Argentine Polo Championship is the sport's most important international team trophy. The country is home to most of the world's top players, among them Adolfo Cambiaso, the best in polo history.

Juan Manuel Fangio was a five-time Formula One world champion under four different teams, winning 102 of his 184 international races, and is widely ranked as the greatest driver of all time. Other distinguished racers were Oscar Alfredo Gálvez, Juan Gálvez, José Froilán González and Carlos Reutemann.

== See also ==
- Outline of Argentina

== Bibliography ==
=== Legal documents ===
- National Constituent Convention (22 August 1994), Constitution of the Argentine Nation, Santa Fe: Argentine Senate, archived from the original on 9 May 2004

=== Articles ===
- Bolt, Jutta; Van Zanden, Jan Luiten (2013). "The First Update of the Maddison Project; Re-estimating Growth Before 1820" (XLS). Maddison Project Working Paper 4. Archived from the original on 5 January 2018.
- Colantoni, Laura; Gurlekian, Jorge (August 2004). "Convergence and intonation. Historical evidence from Buenos Aires Spanish" (PDF). Bilingualism: Language and Cognition. 7 (2). Cambridge, UK: 107–19. doi:10.1017/S1366728904001488. hdl:11336/118441. S2CID 56111230. Archived from the original (PDF) on 26 July 2020.
- Cruz, Arturo Jr. (6 August 1990). "Glory Past but Not Forgotten". Insight on the News. Vol. 6, no. 32. New York: News World Communications. p. 8.
- DellaPergola, Sergio (2013). "World Jewish Population, 2013". In Dashefsky, Arnold; Sheskin, Ira (eds.). The American Jewish Year Book, 2013. American Jewish Year Book. Vol. 113. Dordrecht: Springer. pp. 279–358. doi:10.1007/978-3-319-01658-0_6. ISBN 978-3-319-01658-0.
- Long, Marshall (April 2009). "What is So Special About Shoebox Halls? Envelopment, Envelopment, Envelopment" (PDF). Acoustics Today. 5 (2): 21–25. doi:10.1121/1.3182843. Archived from the original (PDF) on 8 August 2017.
- Malamud, Andrés (2011). "A Leader Without Followers? The Growing Divergence Between the Regional and Global Performance of Brazilian Foreign Policy". Latin American Politics and Society. 53 (3). Lisbon: 1–24. doi:10.1111/j.1548-2456.2011.00123.x. hdl:10451/15545. S2CID 154469332.
- Mallimaci, Fortunato; Esquivel, Juan Cruz; Irrazábal, Gabriela (26 August 2008). "Primera Encuesta Sobre Creencias y Actitudes Religiosas En Argentina" (PDF) (in Spanish). Buenos Aires: CONICET – Consejo Nacional de Investigaciones Científicas y Técnicas. Archived (PDF) from the original on 10 October 2015.
- Solomon, Hussein (1997). "South African Foreign Policy, Middle Power Leadership and Preventive Diplomacy" (PDF). Pretoria, South Africa: Centre for International Political Studies. Archived from the original (PDF) on 19 April 2014.

=== Books ===
- Abad de Santillán, Diego (1971). Historia Argentina (in Spanish). Buenos Aires: Tipográfica Editora Argentina.
- Adler, Emanuel; Greve, Patricia (2009). "When security community meets balance of power: overlapping regional mechanisms of security governance". In Fawn, Rick (ed.). Globalising the Regional, Regionalising the Global. Review of International Studies. Vol. 35. Cambridge: Cambridge University Press. pp. 59–84. ISBN 978-0-521-75988-5.
- Aeberhard, Danny; Benson, Andrew; Phillips, Lucy (2000). The rough guide to Argentina. London: Rough Guides. ISBN 978-1-85828-569-6.
- Akstinat, Björn (2013). Handbuch der deutschsprachigen Presse im Ausland (in German). Berlin: IMH–Verlag. ISBN 978-3-9815158-1-7.
- Anderson, Sean K.; Sloan, Stephen (3 August 2009). Historical Dictionary of Terrorism. Scarecrow Press. ISBN 9780810863118. Archived from the original on 29 November 2023.
- Arbena, Joseph (1999). Latin American sport: an annotated bibliography, 1988–1998. Bibliographies and indexes on sports history. Vol. 3. Westport, CT: Greenwood Press. ISBN 978-0-3132-9611-6.
- Arbena, Joseph. "In Search of the Latin American Female Athlete". In Arbena & LaFrance (2002), pp. 219–232.
- Arbena, Joseph; LaFrance, David Gerald, eds. (2002). Sport in Latin America and the Caribbean. Lanham, MD: Rowman & Littlefield. ISBN 978-0-8420-2821-9.
- Barnes, John (1978). Evita, First Lady: A Biography of Eva Perón. New York: Grove Press. ISBN 978-0-8021-3479-0.
- Bidart Campos, Germán J. (2005). Manual de la Constitución Reformada (in Spanish). Vol. I. Buenos Aires: Ediar. ISBN 978-950-574-121-2.
- Bloom, Harold (1994). The Western Canon:la The Books and School of the Ages. New York: Harcourt Brace & Company. ISBN 978-1-57322-514-4.
- Boughton, James M. (2012). Tearing Down Walls. The International Monetary Fund 1990–1999. Washington, DC: International Monetary Fund. ISBN 978-1-61635-084-0.
- Crow, John A. (1992). The Epic of Latin America (4th ed.). Berkeley: University of California Press. ISBN 978-0-520-07723-2.
- Díaz Alejandro, Carlos F. (1970). Essays on the Economic History of the Argentine Republic. New Haven, CT: Yale University Press. ISBN 978-0-300-01193-7.
- Dougall, Angus (2013). The Greatest Racing Driver. Bloomington, IN: Balboa Press. ISBN 978-1-4525-1096-5.
- Edwards, Todd L. (2008). Argentina: A Global Studies Handbook. Santa Barbara, CA: ABC-CLIO. ISBN 978-1-85109-986-3.
- Epstein, Edward; Pion-Berlin, David (2006). "The Crisis of 2001 and Argentine Democracy". In Epstein, Edward; Pion-Berlin, David (eds.). Broken Promises?: The Argentine Crisis and Argentine Democracy. Lanham, MD: Lexington Books. pp. 3–26. ISBN 978-0-7391-0928-1.
- Fayt, Carlos S. (1985). Derecho Político (in Spanish). Vol. I (6th ed.). Buenos Aires: Depalma. ISBN 978-950-14-0276-6.
- Fearns, Les; Fearns, Daisy (2005). Argentina. London: Evans Brothers. ISBN 978-0-237-52759-4.
- Foster, David W.; Lockhart, Melissa F.; Lockhart, Darrell B. (1998). Culture and Customs of Argentina. Westport, CT: Greenwood Publishing Group. ISBN 978-0-313-30319-7.
- Friedman, Ian C. (2007). Latino Athletes. New York: Infobase Publishing. ISBN 978-1-4381-0784-4.
- Galasso, Norberto (2011). Historia de la Argentina, vol. I&II (in Spanish). Buenos Aires: Colihue. ISBN 978-950-563-478-1.
- Huntington, Samuel P. (2000). "Culture, Power, and Democracy". In Plattner, Marc; Smolar, Aleksander (eds.). Globalization, Power, and Democracy. Baltimore, MD: The Johns Hopkins University Press. pp. 3–13. ISBN 978-0-8018-6568-8.
- King, John (2000). Magical Reels: A History of Cinema in Latin America. Critical Studies in Latin American & Iberian Cultures. London: Verso. ISBN 978-1-85984-233-1.
- Kopka, Deborah (2011). Central & South America. Dayton, OH: Lorenz Educational Press. ISBN 978-1-4291-2251-1.
- Lake, David (2009). "Regional Hierarchies: Authority and Local International Order". In Fawn, Rick (ed.). Globalising the Regional, Regionalising the Global. Review of International Studies. Vol. 35. Cambridge, UK: Cambridge University Press. pp. 35–58. ISBN 978-0-521-75988-5.
- Levene, Ricardo (1948). Desde la Revolución de Mayo a la Asamblea de 1813–15. Historia del Derecho Argentino (in Spanish). Vol. IV. Buenos Aires: Editorial G. Kraf.
- Lewis, Daniel K. (2003). The History of Argentina. Palgrave Essential Histories Series. New York: Palgrave Macmillan. ISBN 978-1-4039-6254-6.
- Lewis, M. Paul; Simons, Gary F.; Fennig, Charles D., eds. (2014). Ethnologue: Languages of the World (17th ed.). Dallas, TX: Summer Institute of Linguistics International.
- Lewis, Paul (1990). The Crisis of Argentine Capitalism. Chapel Hill, NC: University of North Carolina Press. ISBN 978-0-8078-4356-7.
- Maldifassi, José O.; Abetti, Pier A. (1994). Defense industries in Latin American countries: Argentina, Brazil, and Chile. Praeger. ISBN 978-0-275-94729-3.
- McCloskey, Erin; Burford, Tim (2006). Argentina. Guilford, CT: Bradt Travel Guides. ISBN 978-1-84162-138-8.
- McKinney, Kevin (1993). Everyday geography. New York: GuildAmerica Books. ISBN 978-1-56865-032-6.
- Menutti, Adela; Menutti, María Mercedes (1980). Geografía Argentina y Universal (in Spanish). Buenos Aires: Edil.
- Miller, Marilyn Grace (2004). Rise and Fall of the Cosmic Race. University of Texas Press. pp. 82–89. ISBN 0-292-70572-7. Archived from the original on 29 November 2023.
- Morris, Michael (1988). Mangone, Gerard (ed.). The Strait of Magellan. International Straits of the World. Vol. 11. Dordrecht: Martinus Nijhoff Publishes. ISBN 978-0-7923-0181-3.
- Mosk, Sanford A. (1990). "Latin America and the World Economy, 1850–1914". In Hanke, Lewis; Rausch, Jane M. (eds.). People and Issues in Latin American History. Vol. II: From Independence to the Present. New York: Markus Wiener Publishing. pp. 86–96. ISBN 978-1-55876-018-9.
- Nauright, John; Parrish, Charles, eds. (2012). Sports around the World: History, Culture, and Practice. Vol. 3. Santa Barbara, CA: ABC-CLIO. ISBN 978-1-59884-301-9.
- Nierop, Tom (2001). "The Clash of Civilisations". In Dijkink, Gertjan; Knippenberg, Hans (eds.). The Territorial Factor. Amsterdam: Vossiuspers UvA – Amsterdam University Press. pp. 51–76. ISBN 978-90-5629-188-4.
- O'Donnell, Pacho (1998). El Aguila Guerrera: La Historia Argentina Que No Nos Contaron (in Spanish) (3rd ed.). Editorial Sudamericana. ISBN 978-9500714617.
- Papadopoulos, Anestis (2010). The International Dimension of EU Competition Law and Policy. Cambridge: Cambridge University Press. ISBN 978-0-521-19646-8.
- Rey Balmaceda, Raúl (1995). Mi país, la Argentina (in Spanish). Buenos Aires: Arte Gráfico Editorial Argentino. ISBN 978-84-599-3442-8.
- Rivas, José Andrés (1989). Santiago en sus letras: antología criticotemática de las letras santiagueñas (in Spanish). Santiago del Estero, SE, Argentina: Universidad Nacional de Santiago del Estero.
- Robben, Antonius C.G.M. (2011). Political Violence and Trauma in Argentina. Philadelphia: University of Pennsylvania Press. ISBN 978-0-8122-0331-8.
- Rock, David (1987). Argentina, 1516–1987: From Spanish Colonization to the Falklands War. Berkeley, CA: University of California Press. ISBN 978-0-520-06178-1.
- Rodríguez, Robert G. (2009). The Regulation of Boxing: A History and Comparative Analysis of Policies Among American States. Jefferson, NC: McFarland. ISBN 978-0-7864-5284-2.
- Rosenblat, Ángel (1964). El nombre de la Argentina (in Spanish). Buenos Aires: EUDEBA – Editorial Universitaria de Buenos Aires.
- Ruiz-Dana, Alejandra; Goldschag, Peter; Claro, Edmundo; Blanco, Hernán (2009). "Regional Integration, Trade and Conflicts in Latin America". In Khan, Shaheen Rafi (ed.). Regional Trade Integration and Conflict Resolution. New York: Routledge. pp. 15–44. ISBN 978-0-415-47673-7.
- Sánchez Viamonte, Carlos (1948). Historia Institucional Argentina (in Spanish) (2nd ed.). Mexico D. F.: Fondo de Cultura Económica.
- Traba, Juan (1985). Origen de la palabra "¿¡Argentina!?" (in Spanish). Rosario, SF, Argentina: Escuela de Artes Gráficas del Colegio San José.
- Vanossi, Jorge R. (1964). Situación actual del federalismo: aspectos institucionales y económicos, en particular sobre la realidad argentina. Cuadernos de ciencia política de la Asociación Argentina de Ciencia Política (in Spanish). Vol. 2. Buenos Aires: Ediciones Depalma.
- Wilson, Jonathan (23 August 2016). Angels with Dirty Faces: How Argentine Soccer Defined a Nation and Changed the Game Forever. PublicAffairs. ISBN 9781568585529. Archived from the original on 18 April 2023.
- Wood, Bernard (1988). The middle powers and the general interest. Ottawa: North–South Institute. ISBN 978-0-920494-81-3.
- Young, Richard; Cisneros, Odile (2010). Historical Dictionary of Latin American Literature and Theater. Lanham, MD: Scarecrow Press. ISBN 978-0-8108-7498-5.
- Young, Ronald (2005). "Argentina". In McColl, Robert W. (ed.). Encyclopedia of World Geography. Vol. I. New York: Golson Books. pp. 51–53. ISBN 978-0-8160-7229-3.
