= Infamous Decade =

Period of Argentine history from 1930 to 1943

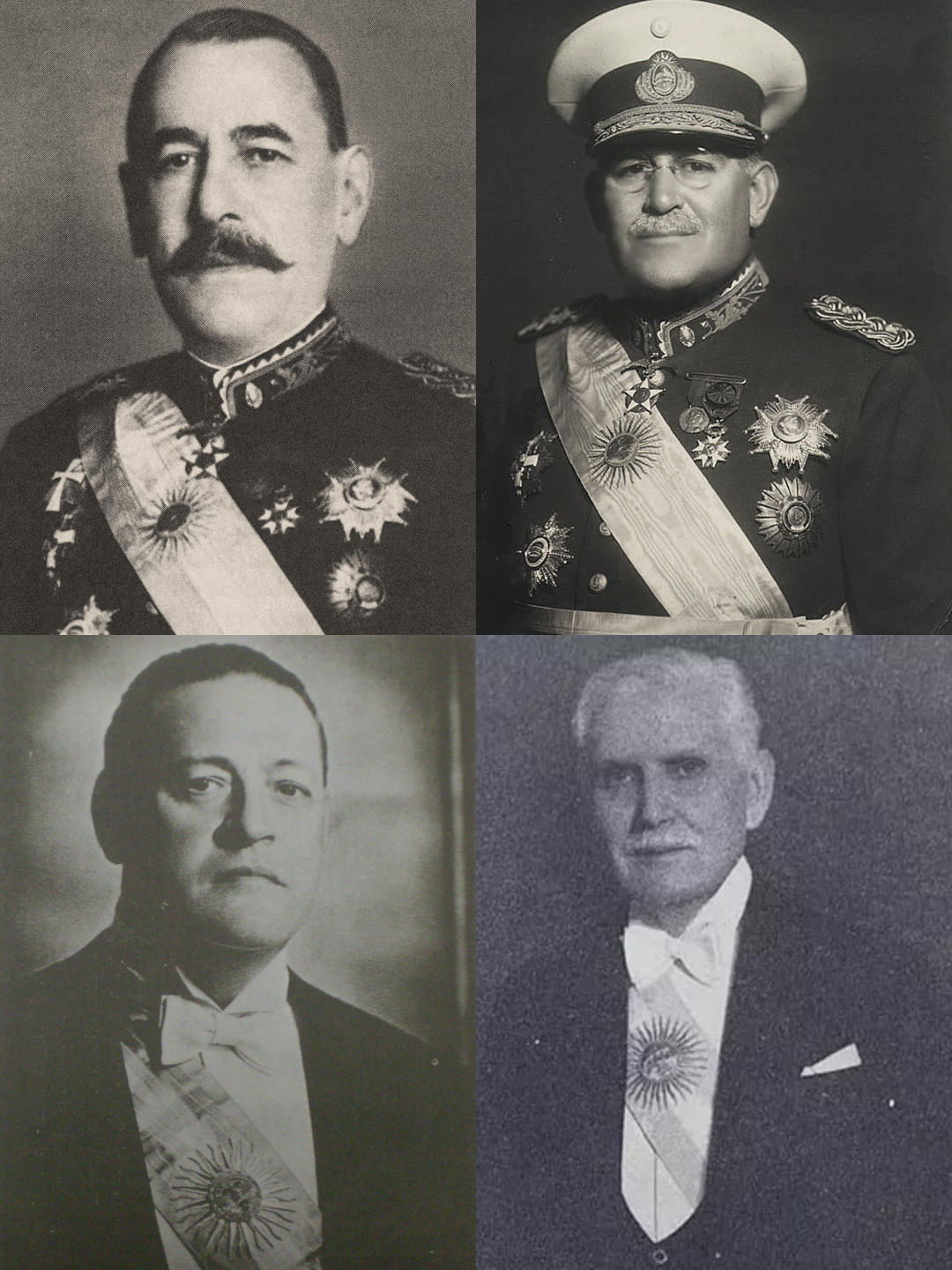
The four presidents of the period (left-to-right, top-to-bottom): Uriburu, Justo, Ortiz and Castillo

The Infamous Decade (Spanish: Década Infame) was a period in Argentine history that began with the 1930 coup d'état against President Hipólito Yrigoyen. This decade was marked on one hand by significant rural exodus, with many small rural landowners ruined by the Great Depression, which in turn pushed the country towards import substitution industrialization, and on the other hand, conservative governments stayed in power perpetually by electoral fraud. The poor results of economic policies and popular discontent led to another coup in 1943, the Revolution of 1943, by the Grupo de Oficiales Unidos (GOU), a nationalist faction of the Armed Forces, which triggered the rise to power of Juan Perón.

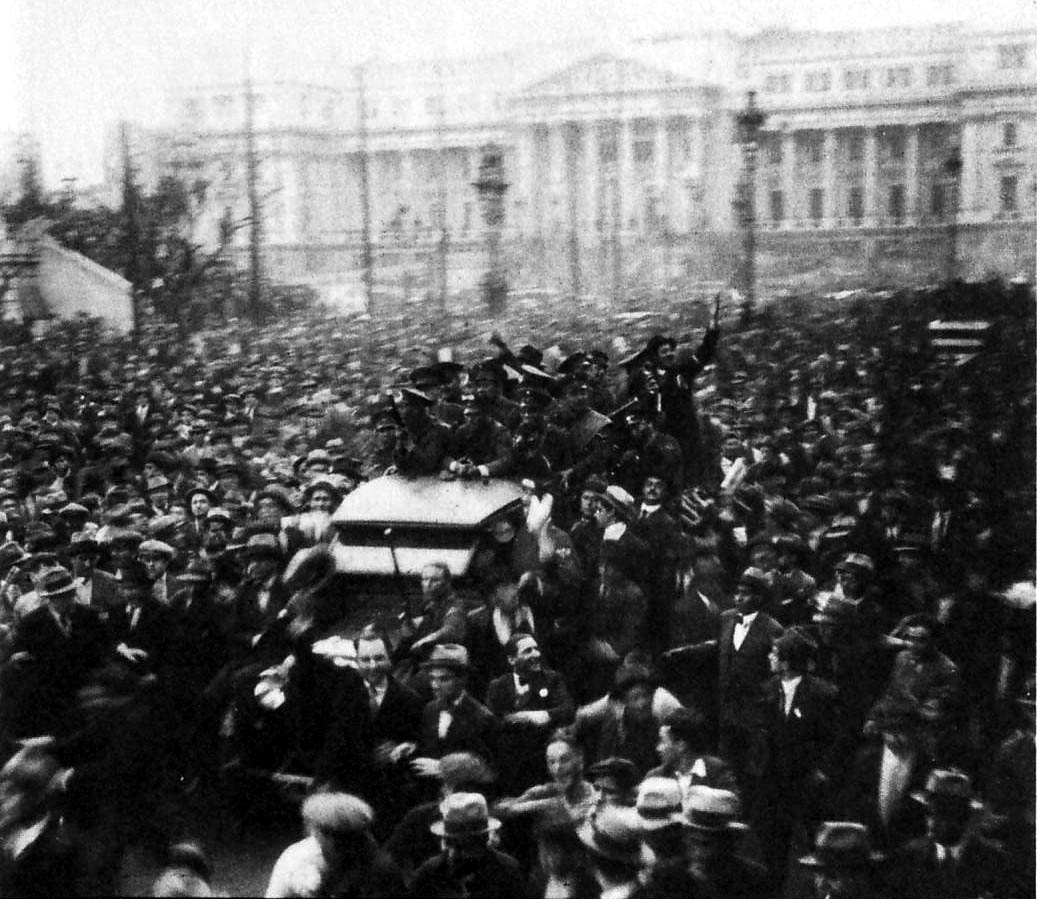
The Coup d'état of September 6, 1930

Besides electoral fraud, this period was characterized by the persecution of the political opposition (mainly against the UCR) and generalized government corruption, against the background of the Great Depression. The impact of the economic crisis forced many farmers and other rural workers to relocate to the outskirts of the larger cities, resulting in the creation of the first villas miseria (shanty towns). Thus, the population of Buenos Aires jumped from 1.5 million inhabitants in 1914 to 3.5 million in 1935. Lacking in political experience, in contrast with the European immigrants who brought with them socialist and anarchist ideas, these new city dwellers would provide the social base, in the next decade, for Peronism.

The democratic liberal senator Lisandro de la Torre (founder in 1914 of the Democratic Progressive Party) denounced various scandals, directing an investigation on the meat trade starting in 1935. In the midst of the investigation, de la Torre's disciple, senator-elect Enzo Bordabehere, was murdered by Ramón Valdez Cora on the Senate floor, and the province of Santa Fe was intervened. The murder was depicted by Juan José Jusid's 1984 film, Asesinato en el Senado de la Nación. CHADE (Compañía Hispano Argentina de Electricidad, an offshoot of the Sofina multinational conglomerate) was also at the heart of an important political and financial scandal. The CHADE scandal, symbol of the Infamous Decade, led to investigations following the revolution of 1943 that deposed Ramón Castillo's government in a military coup, and to the subsequent Rodríguez Conde report on concessions given to the electrical companies.

In 1931, a year after the execution of the Italian anarchist Severino Di Giovanni and his comrade Paulino Scarfó—who had implemented a propaganda of the deed campaign aimed both at international support of the Sacco and Vanzetti case and at attacking Fascist Italy's interests in Argentina—three anarchists were given life sentences during a show trial in which they were tortured, on the charges of having assassinated family members of conservative politician José M. Blanch. Known as the "prisoners of Bragado" (presos de Bragado), the case raised international public indignation. Anarchists, who had created a solidarity network with comrades expelled under the 1902 Law on Residency which legalised the expulsion of immigrants who "compromise national security or disturb public order", were considered as public enemies by Uriburu's dictatorship. Prior to their execution, three anarchist bombs had detonated at three strategic places on the Buenos Aires railway network on January 20 1931, killing three and wounding 17. In 1942, Minister Solano Lima signed the prisoners' releases; their names were cleared by a 1993 law upheld by Socialist deputy Guillermo Estévez Boero. In 2003, a law granted a pension to the daughter of one of the anarchist victims of this show trial.

== Agustín P. Justo's presidency (1932–1938) ==
In 1933 Arturo Jauretche took part in a failed uprising, led by Col. Francisco Bosch and Col. Gregorio Pomar in Paso de los Libres, in the province of Corrientes. He was subsequently detained.

=== Political situation ===
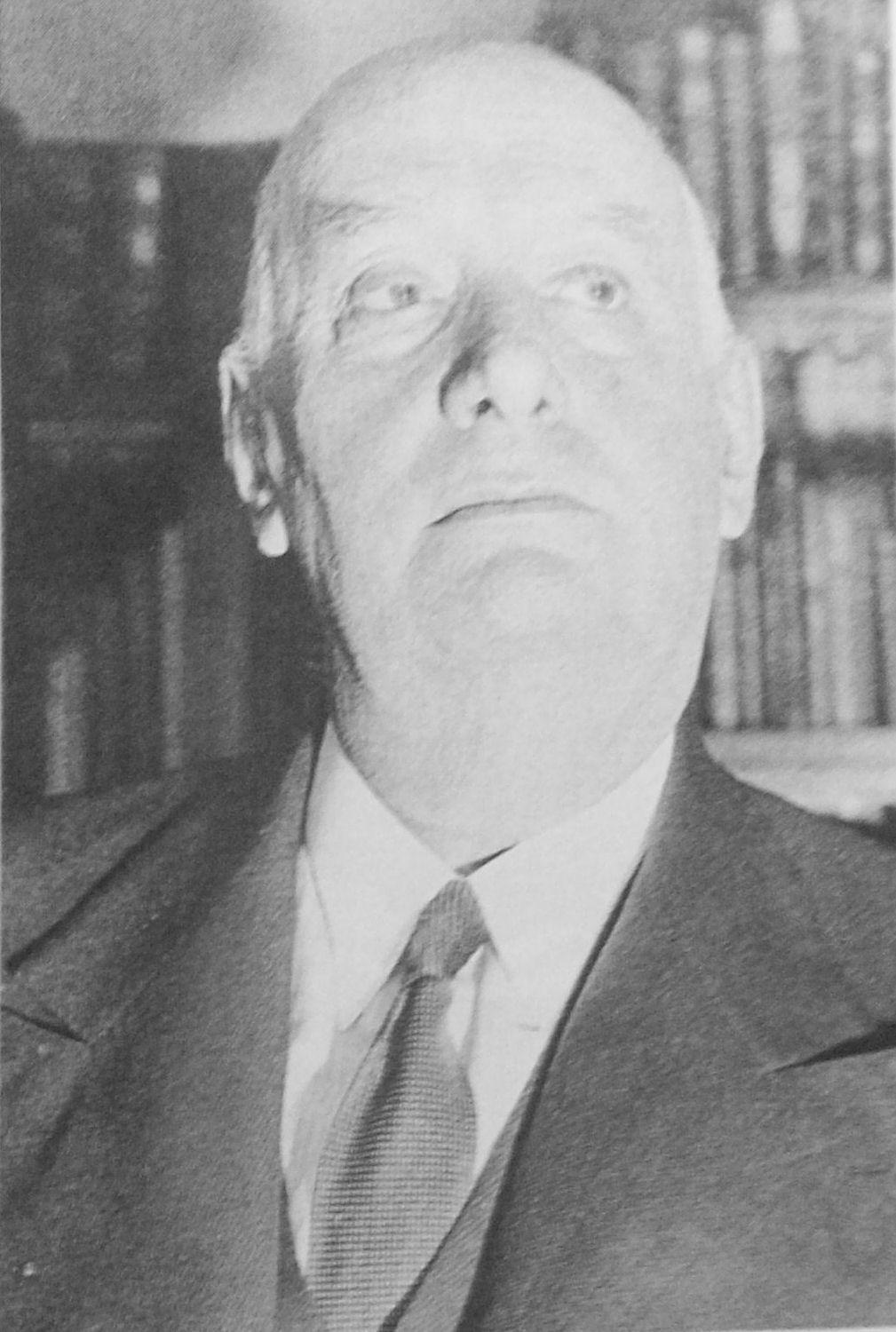
Alvear was the leader of radicalism during the Infamous Decade, and for this reason he was imprisoned on Martín García Island.

One of the most notorious corruption cases of the period was the CHADE (Compañía Hispano-Americana de Electricidad) scandal.

In 1936, divisions within radicalism deepened under the influence of the scandal over the concession of the Compañía Hispano-Americana de Electricidad (CHADE), which had been accused of bribing conservative and radical politicians to obtain the concession, including the then Minister of Finance and future president Roberto M. Ortiz.

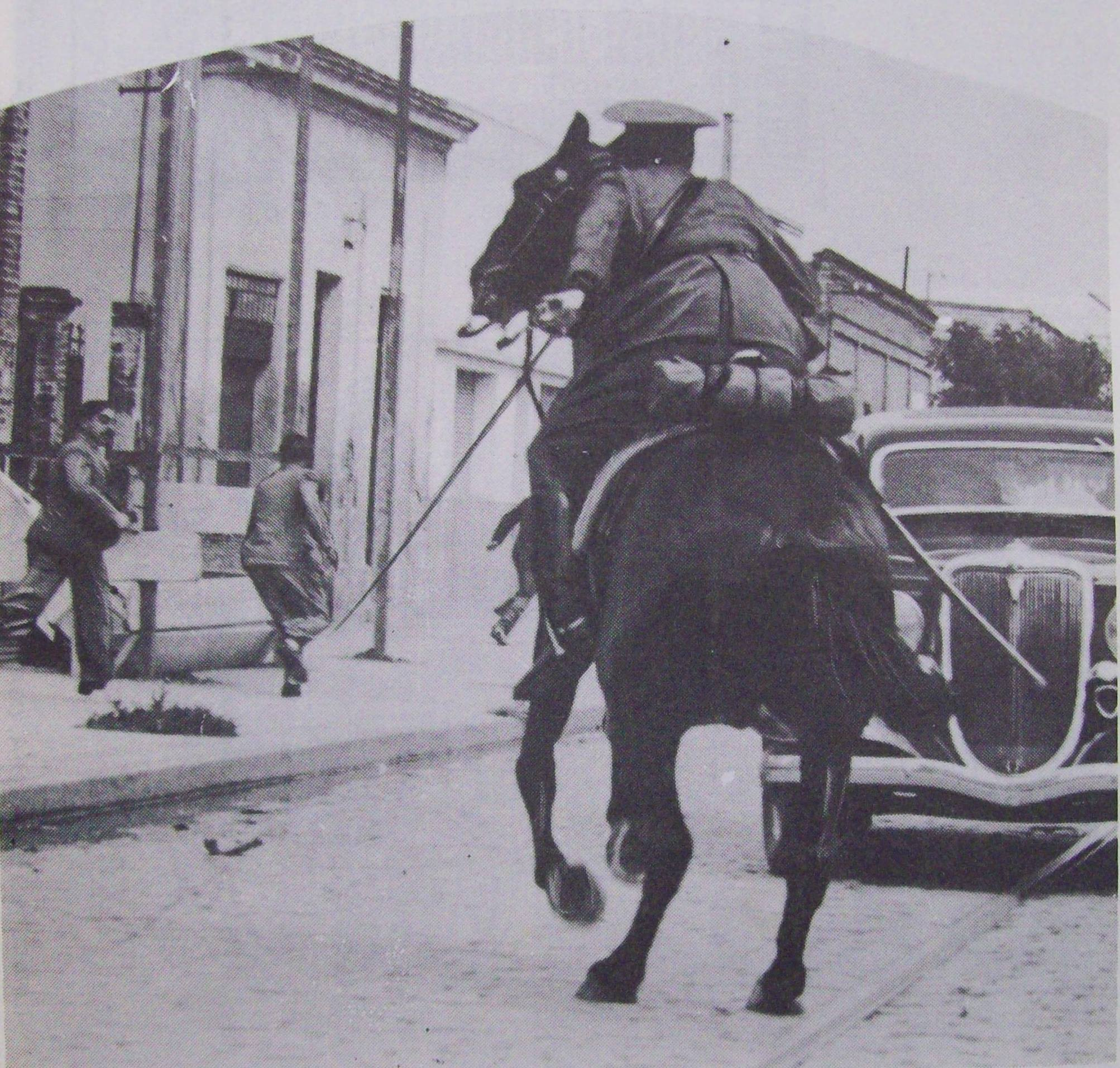
A mounted police officer chases supporters of radicalism.

Alvear said the following about the conservatives:

I have known that radicalism and the conservatives of Buenos Aires for fifty years, and let us agree that those conservatives have not improved in any way, they have done nothing for the benefit of the province. I have known them for fifty years, because I have been active there. They had thugs and double-bottom ballot boxes at their service. I broke one in Morón. Today they are preparing to use the same weapons.

— Marcelo T. de Alvear.

==== UCR uprisings ====
During his term, the Radical Civic Union opposition, which had declared electoral abstention due to the illegitimacy of the regime, was very pronounced. In 1933, radical uprisings took place in Buenos Aires, Corrientes, Entre Ríos and Misiones, resulting in more than a thousand detainees. Yrigoyen, gravely ill, was returned to Buenos Aires and kept under house arrest; he would die on 3 July, and his burial in La Recoleta Cemetery would be the occasion for a massive demonstration. In December, on the occasion of the meeting of the UCR national convention, a joint uprising of military personnel and politicians broke out in Santa Fe, Rosario and Paso de los Libres. José Benjamín Ábalos, former minister of Yrigoyen, and Colonel Roberto Bosch were arrested for the uprising, and the party's delegates and leaders imprisoned on Martín García. Alvear, a former political sponsor of Justo, went into exile, while others were held in the Ushuaia Prison.

=== Economic and social policy ===
Minister of Economy Hueyo was succeeded by the lawyer Federico Pinedo, a member of the Independent Socialist Party, who would mark a shift in government policy. State intervention in the economy became more pronounced, with the creation of the National Grain Board, the Meat Board, the Cotton Board, the Yerba Mate Board, the Wine Regulatory Board, and the Dairy Industry Board. In all cases, the policies implemented were aimed at protecting the interests of large producers at the expense of smaller ones.Sanguinetti 1977, p. 77-78

He also ordered the definitive closure of the Currency Board (Caja de Conversión), which until 1929 had exchanged paper money for gold. To replace it as a tool for exchange rate control, he consulted the Bank of England, which sent one of its directors, Otto Niemeyer, to Buenos Aires. Niemeyer drafted a proposal for the creation of the Central Bank of Argentina (Banco Central de la República Argentina), which was approved by Congress through Laws 12,155 to 12,160, enacted successively in March 1935;Sanguinetti 1977, p. 76-77 the Central Bank opened in June of that year, headed by Raúl Prebisch.

==== The Roca-Runciman Treaty ====
It was during Justo's term that Argentina signed the Roca-Runciman Treaty with the United Kingdom, which assured the UK a provision of fresh meat in exchange for important investments in the field of transportation in Argentina, given certain economic concessions from Argentina, such as giving control over the public transport in Buenos Aires to a British company, the Corporación de Transportes.

At the 1932 Ottawa Conference, the British had adopted measures that favored imports from its own colonies and dominions. The pressure from Argentine landowners for whom the government restored trade with the main buyer of Argentine grain and meat had been very strong. Led by the president of the British Trade Council, Viscount Walter Runciman, they were intense and resulted in the signing on April 27 of the Roca-Runciman Treaty.

The treaty created a scandal, because the UK allotted Argentina a quota less than any of its dominions—390,000 tons of meat per year were allotted to Argentina in exchange for many concessions to British companies, and 85% of exportation had to be arranged through British refrigerated shippers. In addition, the tariffs of the railways operated by the UK were not regulated, the treaty did not establish customs fees over coal, had given special dispensation to British companies with investments in Argentina and had reduced the prices of their exports.

The National Democratic Party, one of the parties that had supported the nomination of Justo for President, had split because of this controversy. Finally the Senate rescinded the treaty on July 28. Many workers strikes followed the deliberations, especially in Santa Fé Province, which ended with government intervention.

==== Import substitution industrialization and Pinedo's economic policies ====
On the other hand, the trade isolationism of the world powers ultimately prompted the beginning of Argentine industrial development via import substitution. Important firms, such as the Bunge & Born agribusiness food company and the Tornquist group, previously turned towards exports but began to diversify their activities and invest in national industries aimed at local consumption.

Under the direction of Minister of Economy Federico Pinedo, economic policy became interventionist, although still with a conservative aim. Pinedo created the Central Bank (BCRA), which was advised by Sir Otto Niemeyer, the director of the Bank of England. The BCRA's board of director was mainly composed of personalities tied to private banks. It had as its missions the managing of the peso and the regulation of interest rates. Writer and thinker Raúl Scalabrini Ortiz was a strong critic of British involvement in Argentina, of which the BCRA itself was the prime example.

The Juntas Reguladores Nacionales were also created during this period, aimed at developing private and state activities and controlling the quality of products, both for national consumption and for export. In order to support prices of products and avoid overproduction, the Juntas destroyed entire loads of corn, used as fuel for locomotives, despite popular hunger. Thirty million pesos per year were spent to destroy wine products.

Furthermore, Pinedo launched a national project of road construction, the national network reaching 30,000 kilometers in 1938 (although many remained without pavement). This competed with the railway system, in the hands of mostly British companies, and furthered the penetration of US firms selling motor vehicles in the Argentine market. US foreign direct investment (FDI) grew during this time, with companies such as the textile firms Sudamtex, Ducilo and Anderson Clayton establishing themselves in Argentina, as well as the tire companies Firestone and Goodyear, the electronics firm Philco and the chemistry firm Johnson & Johnson.

Notable exceptions to these conservative policies were the policies of Luciano Molinas, governor of the Santa Fe Province (1932–1936) and one of the leader of the Democratic Progressive Party, and of Amadeo Sabattini, Governor of Córdoba (1936–1940). The first act of governor Molinas, assuming office on February 20, 1932, was to re-establish the progressive Constitution of the Santa Fe Province established by the Constituent Assembly of 1921, which had been abrogated by the radical governor Enrique Mosca. He also ensured independence of the judicial system, tax equality, secular education, women's suffrage and right of foreigners' to vote for the election of communal authorities. Molinas' administration also created the Provincial Department of Labour, which ensured the observance of article 28 of the provincial Constitution, concerning the 8 hours day, minimum wages and regulation of child and female labour. Molinas also reduced his salary from 2,500 to 1,800 pesos, suspended payment of the external debt of the province, which permitted Santa Fe's budget to become positive. Henceforth, he subsidized public works under the impulsion of the minister Alberto Casella, leading to increased local employment. He also implemented moderate land reforms, harshly opposed by the conservative and Alvearist radicals, as well as the Sociedad Rural Argentina. Finally, he created the Experimental Institute of Agricultural Investigation, a predecessor of the National Agricultural Technology Institute (INTA).

However, fearing electoral defeats for the Concordancia both in Santa Fe and in the Electoral College, Justo ordered military intervention in the Santa Fe Province on October 3, 1935, sending the Colonel Perlinger and the minister Joaquín F. Rodríguez to take control of the local government. Armed resistance against the federal intervention occurred, but in order to avoid a bloodbath, Molinas and De la Torre rejected the resistance. Rodríguez soon abrogated again the 1921 Constitution and progressively dismantled Molinas' achievements.

Justo had already ordered intervention in the Provinces of San Juan and Tucumán in 1934, and ordered similar military interventions in Catamarca, Santa Fe and Buenos Aires in 1935 (the latter enabling the fraudulent election of Manuel Fresco as governor). Despite this federal intervention, Marcelo Alvear's Radical party (UCR) decided in 1935 to abandon its abstentionist policy protesting the fraud. Opposed to Alvear's turnaround, in 1935, young Yrigoyenistas from a nationalist background founded FORJA (Fuerza Orientadora Radical de la Juventud Argentina, Radical Orienting Force of Argentine Youth), which had as leaders Arturo Jauretche, Raúl Scalabrini Ortiz and Gabriel del Mazo. FORJA's motto was: "We are a colonial Argentina, we want to be a free Argentina." Among other things, FORJA denounced the silence of the government on many problems such as the creation of the Central Bank, "economic sacrifices imposed in benefices of foreign capitalism", "petroleum politics", "arbitrary military interventions", "restrictions to freedom of opinion", "incorporation to the League of Nations", "suppression of relations with Russia", "parliamentary investigations", "the Senate crime", etc.

=== The workers' movement ===
At the time of the 1930 coup, three trade unions existed in Argentina: the Confederación Obrera Argentina (COA, founded in 1926 and linked to the Socialist Party), the Unión Sindical Argentina (USA, anarcho-syndicalist) and the FORA V (dissolved by Uriburu). On September 20, 1930, the COA and the USA merged in the General Confederation of Labour (CGT), although the two rival tendencies remained.

Meanwhile, the syndicalist current of the CGT was discredited, because of its supporting alliance with the government in order to achieve social advances, while the socialist current proposed open opposition, tied to political support to the Socialist party. The syndicalist current was in particular affected by its agreements with the pro-fascist governor of Buenos Aires, Manuel Fresco (1936–1940). The latter, who had been elected during one of the "most burlesque" and "fraudulent" elections of the Infamous Decade (according to the words of the US ambassador,) commissioned the architect Francisco Salamone various buildings, which combined Art Deco, functionalism, Futurism and Fascist architectures.

Although the Great Depression and the subsequent rural exodus had brought many politically inexperienced workers to Buenos Aires, the spontaneous import substitution industrialization enabled, starting in 1935, coupled to the strengthening of trade unions, wages' increase. Henceforth, a 48-hour general strike was launched in January 1936 by workers' in construction, during which 3 workers and 3 policemen were killed.

=== Foreign policy ===
In 1933, Justo ordered Argentina's re-entry into the League of Nations. Foreign Minister Carlos Saavedra Lamas proposed and secured an Anti-war Treaty of Non-Aggression and Conciliation, with which he sought to halt the military escalation that was becoming evident in Europe.

Faced with the Chaco War between Bolivia and Paraguay, Justo's government, through his foreign minister Saavedra Lamas, attempted to mobilize the governments of the region against the Monroe Doctrine, promoted by the government of the United States. His initiatives led in 1933 to the signing of the so-called Anti-war Pact of Saavedra Lamas. After arduous and complex negotiations, on 7 June Bolivia and Paraguay finally signed two protocols ending the war, and in 1938 they signed the Treaty of Peace, Friendship and Boundaries. For his efforts in the conflict, Saavedra Lamas received the Nobel Peace Prize in 1936.

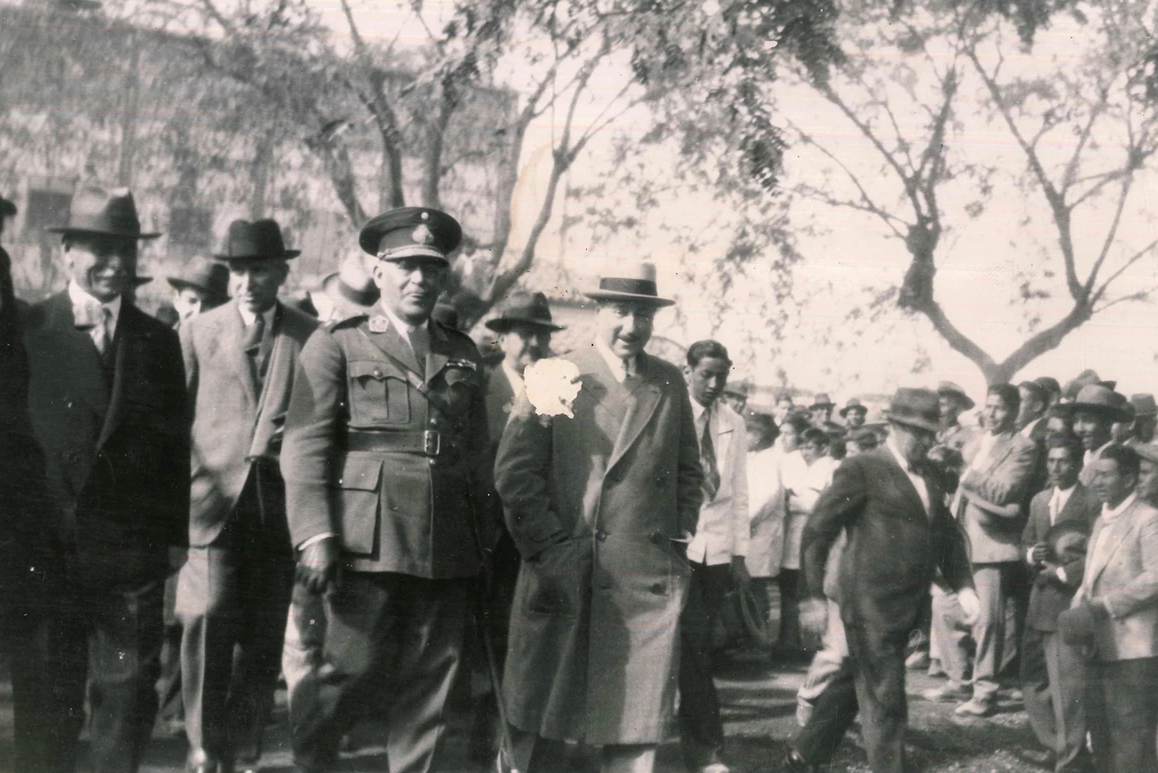
Robustiano Patrón Costas and the President of the Nation Agustín Pedro Justo at the Ingenio El Tabacal, 1934

These successes in foreign policy contrasted with the attitude of the president himself, who seemed to attach no importance to external affairs. Regarding the Chaco War, he had a clear preference—due to personal economic interests—in favor of Paraguay, to which he even sold some weapons. But he allowed Minister Saavedra Lamas to act and did not oppose his pacifist negotiations. Later, when the Spanish Civil War broke out, he did not even make a public comment.

== Roberto M. Ortiz presidency (1938–1940) ==
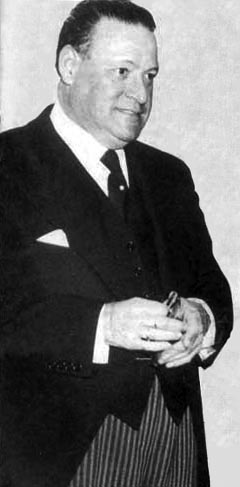
President Roberto M. Ortiz, of the Antipersonalist Radical Civic Union, was prevented from exercising the presidency from 1940 due to the diabetes he suffered from, dying in 1942 before completing his term.

Roberto Marcelino Ortiz and Ramón S. Castillo's candidacies, respectively as president and vice-president, for the 1938 elections were launched at the British Chamber of Commerce, and supported by its president William Mc Callum. Ortiz, a former Alvearista, was fraudulently elected, and assumed his new office in February 1938.

Immediately after Ortiz took office, elections for national deputies were held, and the PDN again prevailed thanks to massive fraud; in Ortiz's defense, it can be said that he had not had time to intervene in the electoral systems, which were controlled in each province by their governments and police. All parties had resorted to fraud and vetoes from their leadership during internal elections.

=== Against fraud: federal interventions ===
However, during the rest of the year provincial elections were held, and Ortiz's good intentions clashed with the methods already established by the government of Justo: for the most part, they were a scandal of fraud, tricks, pressure, and violence; in Santa Fe it was known that there was fraud in rural towns, but this time it was openly practiced in the centers of the provincial capital and Rosario. In Buenos Aires not only fraud and thuggery were displayed in full force—and secured Manuel Fresco a victory of 355,000 votes over 62,000 for the UCR—but the government even went so far as to move elected deputies from their original positions on the electoral list. The only clean elections were those in Córdoba and Tucumán—governed by radicals—and the Federal Capital, where fraud would have been excessively visible. Meanwhile, Ortiz limited himself to continuing to promise free and fair elections. Without much success, Ortiz attempted to clean up the country's corruption, ordering federal intervention in the Province of Buenos Aires, governed by Fresco, and cancelling the fraudulent elections which had been won by the conservative Alberto Barceló.

As part of his policy of democratic reform, he decreed federal intervention in several provinces where his own political coalition had prevailed through fraud, including Buenos Aires, Santiago del Estero, San Juan and Catamarca.

The case of Catamarca—home province of Vice President Castillo—was extreme: the elections of December 3, 1939, organized by governor Juan Gregorio Cerezo, surpassed all others of the period: polling authorities were manipulated, votes were added to ballot boxes, hundreds of citizens were prevented from voting while those of people brought in from Salta, Tucumán, and Santiago del Estero were accepted; when voters protested at being prevented from voting, they were repressed and sometimes arrested. Ortiz saw in that election the opportunity to demonstrate that he was willing to end such practices: ten days after the elections, the Minister of the Interior Diógenes Taboada demanded that Governor Cerezo annul the elections and call new ones, threatening federal intervention in the province. The president of the National Democratic Party, Alberto Arancibia Rodríguez, supported the governor, but Ortiz decided to wait until the Electoral College announced the victory of the official candidate; in February, the day after the announcement, Ortiz responded by decreeing federal intervention. He appointed General Rodolfo Martínez Pita, president of the Council of War for Chiefs and Officers, as federal interventor, with the order to dissolve the legislature and call elections "with all safeguards and guarantees of freedom for voters."

In Buenos Aires, the conservative Manuel Fresco governed; his ideas were closer to the far right than to conservatism. In February 1940 he organized elections to choose his successor, promoting the candidacy of the local strongman of Avellaneda, Alberto Barceló. Thanks to elections that were a model of all vices and frauds, Barceló was elected governor. Ortiz did the same as in Catamarca: he waited for the official proclamation and decreed federal intervention, taking care to act before the start of the ordinary sessions of Congress, which would have required him to secure its approval. The Buenos Aires ruling party did not even attempt to defend him: Fresco had implemented some measures in favor of workers, such as pressuring companies to raise wages or building affordable housing. Fresco was replaced by federal interventor Octavio R. Amadeo, who annulled the elections.

In Santiago del Estero, however, Ortiz had to face a crisis within the ruling party over the succession to the governorship between the candidate of Governor Pío Montenegro and his predecessor—Juan Bautista Castro, then a national senator, both antipersonalist radicals. Castro requested federal intervention and used his seat in Congress to level accusations of all kinds of crimes, including fraud and violence to win elections—which was true, but was exactly how Castro himself had reached the governorship, and how he had secured Montenegro's election. Provincial deputies refused to attend sessions and fled to Tucumán to avoid being compelled by the police. In September, the president presented the federal intervention bill in the Senate, where Montenegro had no one to defend him. A few days later, Congress approved the intervention and the new interventor took office in October; elections were held at the beginning of the following year and, under pressure from Ortiz, the candidates of Montenegro and Castro were excluded. The new governor was José Ignacio Cáceres, a personal friend of Ortiz, who would end up applying the same methods as his predecessors.

=== Foreign policy ===
In August 1938, the eighth Pan-American Conference was held in Lima. The Argentine delegation was led by José María Cantilo, Minister of Foreign Affairs. The United States promoted a collective security pact among the American states, in anticipation of the explosive global situation, but Argentina refused to support this view. This was partly due to a tradition of neutrality since the years of the First World War, when Yrigoyen had prioritized national interests, but especially due to the unusually compliant and submissive attitude of the Concordancia leadership toward the United Kingdom: the United States was not supported in order to remain fully dependent on Great Britain. The following year, Ortiz predicted that in the war, which everyone already considered inevitable, there could be no neutrals. But upon receiving news of the Molotov–Ribbentrop Pact and the invasion of Poland, Ortiz hastened to declare Argentine neutrality; he possibly feared the reaction of the Army if he did not do so.

Shortly thereafter, Argentina proposed and the United States convened an assembly of foreign ministers of all the Americas; at that meeting, the Argentine representative Leopoldo Melo appeared unexpectedly accommodating toward the United States, partly because it proposed joint actions against the danger of war, but at the same time pressed for neutrality.

One of the most controversial measures of his term was the secret antisemitic circular signed in 1938 by Foreign Minister, also an antipersonalist radical, José María Cantilo, which ordered Argentine consuls in Europe to deny visas to "undesirables or expelled persons," referring to Jewish citizens of that continent.

During World War II, Argentina maintained the same neutrality it had adopted during the first World War, which was advantageous for Great Britain. Although the USA attempted to push the country into the war, during the January 1942 Rio de Janeiro Conference, Argentina resisted, with support from the British. A few months later, in June 1942, Ortiz resigned because of his sickness, and died a month later.

Domestically, public opinion—the upper and middle classes, in reality—was divided between supporters of the Allies and supporters of the Axis; while nearly the entire ruling class and students supported the Allies, an impoverished and fearful middle class, and descendants of Germans and Italians fed the Axis camp. That sector was precisely the one predominant among Army officers, forcing the government to be very cautious. However, pro-Allied groups held noisy demonstrations in favor of the Allies and against Nazi brutality. The sinking of the Argentine ship Uruguay by a German submarine in June 1940 provided an excellent occasion for the upper classes to show their indignation and demand that the president declare war on the Axis. But Ortiz, who sympathized with that view, was no longer in a condition to take such measures.

=== Illness and Ortiz's leave: Castillo acting as president ===
When he was nominated as a presidential candidate, Ortiz already knew he suffered from diabetes; driven by optimism, he convinced himself it would not be serious, but he fainted in the middle of the electoral campaign, in front of thousands of people. Córdoba's own governor, Amadeo Sabattini, diagnosed that the illness was advancing just by seeing him during his visit to Córdoba. In March 1940 he also began to lose his eyesight, and in April his wife, María Luisa Iribarne, died. The president isolated himself for weeks, both due to mourning and blindness, and the government drifted.

In May the El Palomar lands scandal broke out, involving a land purchase for the Army at an inflated price, followed by commissions distributed among legislators, which quickly became a major political issue. In June, diabetes worsened Ortiz's living conditions, especially damaging his eyesight, so he requested leave from the presidency, which was assumed by Castillo.

In August of the same year, Ortiz—still on leave—unexpectedly submitted his resignation, which was rejected by the Senate. This was considered a consequence of the El Palomar lands scandal, and Ortiz interpreted the rejection as a vote of confidence.

== Ramón Castillo presidency (1940–1943) ==
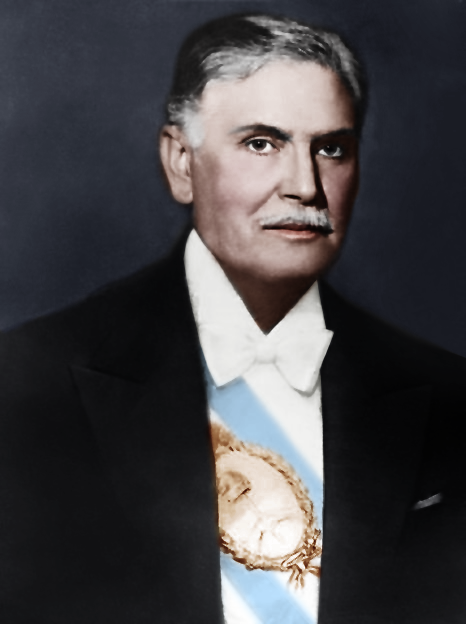
Ramón Castillo, the last ruler of the Infamous Decade. He was overthrown by a military coup on June 4, 1943.

Ortiz was replaced by his vice-president Castillo, who began to work to launch the candidacy of Robustiano Patrón Costas, vice-president of the Senate and sugar entrepreneur, who had supported him in 1938. Meanwhile, the Democratic Union political coalition (which included the Radical Civic Union, the Democratic Progressive Party, as well as the Socialist Party and the Communist Party) had been formed in 1942. Their electoral platform, aimed against endemic corruption, announced the needs to guarantee "freedom of thought and assembly" and "labor union rights", as well as vouching for "active solidarity with the people struggling against the Nazi-Fascist aggression".

In political matters, Castillo pursued an authoritarian policy, with severe repression and federal intervention in several provinces governed by the opposition. Although he was only acting as president, he changed almost his entire cabinet and pursued a policy that was in many ways the opposite of Ortiz's. He also dissolved the Deliberative Council of Buenos Aires, which had been discredited by numerous allegations of corruption.

=== The return of patriotic fraud ===
These first steps were followed by federal intervention in provincial governments of a political orientation opposed to the conservatives. His goal was to consolidate his power through the National Democratic Party as a conservative-leaning party base, dissolving the Concordancia, whose continuity was in doubt because of the policy of fighting electoral fraud carried out by President Ortiz. This latter political decision had been supported by the antipersonalist radicals, by the socialists and by the Radical Civic Union of the National Committee chaired by Marcelo T. de Alvear. Faced with this turn by the government, those parties began to seek common ground to fight the foreseeable return of electoral fraud as a political weapon.

More than a year after Alvear's death, the UCR finally found a leader: Amadeo Sabattini, former governor of Córdoba, took command of radicalism in its struggles against the government. In particular, with the approval of Pueyrredón and Emilio Ravignani, they completely opposed the economic policy of Federico Pinedo; he had sought the support of the radicals, who still held a majority in the Chamber of Deputies; faced with the refusal of the main radical leaders, he was forced to resign in March 1941.

As evidence that he would not continue his predecessor's moralizing policy, as soon as he was in government he ordered the elections in Buenos Aires and Catamarca to be delayed; in the latter province he replaced General Martínez Pita with the far-right writer Gustavo Martínez Zuviría, who organized elections full of irregularities, finally securing the election of Ernesto Andrada, the same man whose fraudulent victory had been annulled by Ortiz. In Mendoza as well, Democratic governors succeeded one another thanks to fraud and the persecution of the Lencinistas.

The advance of Castillo's policies of patriotic fraud even led the retired president Ortiz to release a letter to the press criticizing the abandonment of his aspirations for electoral purity. Considering Ortiz to be outside the framework of power, Castillo publicly answered the accusations, in an attitude that did him no favors. Worse still, he promoted a congressional investigation into Ortiz himself, to determine how far he was tainted by the El Palomar lands affair.

=== Economy ===
==== The Pinedo Plan ====
On September 2, 1940, Castillo had renewed his entire presidential cabinet; for the post of Minister of Finance he chose Federico Pinedo, who, as an Independent Socialist deputy, had criticized the Roca–Runciman Treaty as "a unilateral Argentine obligation". He had later been Justo's Minister of Finance, achieving a slight surplus in the national accounts.

Immediately after taking office in 1940, on 18 November he publicly presented the so-called "Pinedo Plan", or "Economic Reactivation Plan", which consisted of sustaining crop prices through selective state purchases, in principle an idea not very different from the IAPI that Peronism would create five years later. The Plan was to also implement some protectionist measures and building of social lodging in order to face the crisis. He also proposed the nationalization of the British railways, having agreed upon advantageous terms for their owners with them beforehand. However, the conservatives voted against his plan, which led him to resign. It also proposed stimulating public and private construction through 30-year loans from the Central Bank, reinforcing domestic demand for traditional products that could no longer be exported, stimulating industry and exporting to neighboring countries, such as Brazil, and to the United States. It also proposed promoting a customs union with Brazil and amortizing the United Kingdom's debt to Argentina through the transfer to the national state of the railways owned by companies of that origin.

The plan was submitted to the Chamber of Deputies for consideration, but the radicals announced in advance that they would not approve it, and Congress preferred not to waste its time considering a bill that would not be approved without radicalism. In addition, Pinedo was openly pro-Allied, which clashed with Castillo's refusals to enter the war.

In the summer of 1941, after a notorious electoral fraud in Mendoza Province, Pinedo traveled to Mar del Plata to hold several meetings with Marcelo T. de Alvear, to whom he proposed forming a coalition among radicals, democrats and part of the socialists, which would put together unity lists for each election, leaving Castillo and his allies isolated. Alvear accepted enthusiastically, and lavished praise on Pinedo and his economic plan in an article in the newspaper La Nación. However, the initiative was rejected by both conservative legislators and radical leaders. Pinedo resigned that same day.

Because of this kind of unilateral attitude, the Alvear line of radicalism fell increasingly into disrepute, and radicalism was defeated in several elections it had considered safe. Amid efforts to decide its future, Alvear died on March 23, 1942. From that moment, radicalism began a complete restructuring, which had not gone very far when, in June of the following year, the coup d'état broke out.

==== Industry and public companies ====
Without any doubt, the leaders who occupied the government through the coup d'état and fraud were liberals. But reality dragged them along and, following the principles of John Maynard Keynes, the policies of the New Deal of Franklin Delano Roosevelt in the United States, or through their own deduction, they reached the conclusion that only the state could lift the country out of the economic crisis. For that reason, from the middle of that decade onward, all national and provincial governments devoted themselves on a massive scale to carrying out large public works and created institutions intended for economic promotion and the economic rescue of the poorest. And this impulse went much further still during Castillo's government, because the World War forced the suspension of economic relations with the United States, which had reconfigured its entire industrial structure to support its war effort and, consequently, could not supply manufactured goods even to its allies; let alone to a country such as Argentina, which was a diplomatic rival for the northern country. Industry developed with great force, as had happened only during the First World War and under Yrigoyen's leadership.

Castillo's government also took other measures of a similar nationalist character, such as the creation of the Directorate of Military Manufacturing and the opening of Altos Hornos Zapla, the latter under pressure from the military, who feared falling behind in the provision of armaments, especially in relation to Brazil, which had declared war on the Axis and therefore had United States support.

=== Neutrality and the military ===
Castillo's response to the news of Japan's attack on the United States military base at Pearl Harbor, which occurred on December 1, 1941, was to declare a state of siege to prevent demonstrations and public activities by "pro-Allied" sectors, which questioned the continuation of the policy of neutrality.

In mid-February 1942, a military plot against the government nearly broke out; its initial leader was Admiral Abel Renard, an open Nazi sympathizer, and its operational leader was General Benjamín Menéndez. At the last moment, seeing that all those involved were hesitating at the same time, he aborted all the plans. Among those involved was General Pedro Pablo Ramírez, whom Castillo himself would appoint Minister of War in November.

=== More scandals ===
The state of social upheaval continued during 1942, when notorious scandals affecting state institutions, fanned by the sensationalist press, created in public opinion the perception of a state of generalized corruption and the decline of liberal democracy. One of the scandals that generated strong press campaigns was the "scandal of the child callers of the National Lottery", which broke out on September 4, 1942, when a group of the adolescents responsible for calling out the winning numbers in the National Lottery draw had planned a fraud in that day's drawing; it led to the creation of an investigative commission in the National Congress headed by the radical deputy from Santa Fe, Agustín Rodríguez Araya.

The other case, with greater social and journalistic impact, was the "cadet scandal", discovered in August 1942. It involved figures belonging to socially influential circles in Buenos Aires, among them the amateur photographer Jorge Horacio Ballvé Piñeiro, as well as Rómulo Naón Jr., son of the ambassador and former mayor of Buenos Aires Rómulo Naón, and the architect Jorge Duggan, who had been intimate with young cadets of the National Military College, having consensual sexual relations. A court case was opened that culminated in the expulsion of 20 cadets from the Military College, considered the most prestigious institution of the Argentine Army, and the arrest of several civilians, including those already mentioned, on charges of the crime of "corruption of minors". The press, led by the newspaper "Ahora", which was controlled by nationalist military officers, followed the event in a sensationalist tone, drawing parallels between the "moral depravity" of society and the moral decline of Castillo's fraudulent government, using it to attack not only the conservatives but democracy itself, identifying it with "decadence, corruption, collusion, concubinage, prostitution, sodomy and partying". The main target of the diatribes was Jorge Horacio Ballvé Piñero, whose photographs of male nudes—visible in the judicial file preserved in the National Archive—were not sex scenes, not even erections, and had nothing pornographic about them. The investigation was extended to other photographers who recorded male artistic nudes. Demaría says that one of the consequences of the "Scandal" was "a great homosexual hunt [that] was carried out during an extremely complex period: the transition between the end of the so-called Infamous Decade and the birth of Peronism... the dictatorship of President Ramírez—trained in Germany and sympathetic to Hitler—persecuted Jews and homosexuals. It was not remotely on the mass scale of the Third Reich, because the conditions for that did not exist. But the persecution existed."

=== Antarctic claims and formal possession of the continental Antarctic territory ===
On November 6, 1940, Chile established by decree the limits of its Antarctic claims. Argentina formally protested the Chilean decree by note of November 12, 1940, rejecting its validity and expressing a potential claim to the same area.

Argentina formally took possession of the continental Antarctic territory on Deception Island on November 8, 1942, by placing a cylinder containing a document and a flag left there by an expedition under the command of frigate captain Alberto J. Oddera. In January 1943, personnel from the British ship HMS Carnarvon Castle destroyed the evidence of the Argentine possession, planted the British flag and sent the document to Buenos Aires. On March 5 of that year, the Argentine ship ARA 1° de Mayo removed the British flag.

== The provincial administrations ==
=== Buenos Aires ===
With only two exceptions, Uriburu intervened in all the provinces at the time of the coup d'état. Buenos Aires was one of them; there, governor Nereo Crovetto had intervened in the municipalities where the conservatives or the antipersonalist radicals held control. He also enlarged the Superior Court of Justice, and placed in the new posts—four out of seven—jurists directly linked to himself.

Although he intended to impose a corporate regime, Uriburu had publicly committed himself to calling free elections as soon as possible; these took place in April 1931 and, to the surprise of the dictator's allies, gave victory to the Yrigoyenist radical Honorio Pueyrredón. Radicalism had clearly not disappeared, but the government had decreed its extinction, and therefore annulled the elections. After the outbreak and failure of a radical rebellion in Corrientes Province, it banned any Yrigoyenist candidacy; a large number of UCR leaders were banned, arrested—some ended up in the Ushuaia prison—or expelled from the country.

His government announced that it would restore the province's finances through drastic spending cuts, and the entire legislature agreed on making intense adjustments, but each legislator proposed reducing spending in other districts while increasing it in his own. As a result, the provincial government continued to accumulate deficits and cover them with public debt. Martínez de Hoz's prestige declined rapidly and he became increasingly isolated. In mid-1932 a conspiracy to overthrow him, led by the military officer Atilio Cattáneo, was discovered, but not even that managed to improve his image; almost the only people who supported him were the nationalists, a group to which Martínez de Hoz did not belong.

Martínez de Hoz had begun several public works, among them drainage canals in the east of the province. One of them benefited almost exclusively his own estate, for which he was accused of embezzlement and impeachment was requested. The Avellaneda strongman, Alberto Barceló, actively came out against him, and some provincial deputies appeared at Government House to demand the governor's resignation, threatening to bring in the police, who were under their control. Martínez de Hoz submitted his resignation, but a few hours later denounced it and requested federal intervention, which was granted: General Pascual Pistarini restored him to office. The legislature allowed the impeachment proceedings to go ahead and declared the governor suspended from office, while chaos increased in La Plata: nationalist groups occupied parts of the city and Government House, led by General Emilio Kinkelín, who organized clearly fascist demonstrations. That same day, March 15, 1935, Martínez de Hoz left La Plata, to which he never returned: he would die on August 9, but not before being removed from office by the legislature.

After Fresco's resignation and removal, Lieutenant Governor Raúl Díaz assumed the governorship of Buenos Aires Province, limiting himself to organizing the elections for his succession. These took place in the usual atmosphere of violence and electoral fraud and brought to the governorship the physician Manuel Fresco, at that time president of the National Chamber of Deputies and an ally of the Avellaneda strongman Alberto Barceló. He was a respected leader, but he had no political following of his own. During Uriburu's dictatorship and his tenure in the Chamber of Deputies, he became especially notable for repeatedly opposing electoral democracy as it was practiced in his time: he supported more paternalistic forms, in which the people had to be prevented from "making mistakes", for example through open voting systems.

During 1938 the province had to face serious financial problems, which increased the following year, leading to mass layoffs of personnel and salary cuts. Fresco avoided repression; he believed that the prevailing poverty could be fought only with full employment, and that in times of crisis it was the state's responsibility to provide employment directly. In this he followed Franklin Roosevelt: he built dozens of hospitals, municipal buildings, cemeteries, Catholic churches, schools, roads and paved highways.

These works followed specific architectural styles: a large number of towns in the interior of Buenos Aires Province, as well as some in Santa Fe and Córdoba, benefited from the monumental and spectacular architecture of the Art Deco and futurist buildings constructed by Francisco Salamone, with distant inspiration from the architecture of the fascist and Nazi regimes. Also notable were the works of the architect Alejandro Bustillo, who left his mark on the architecture of the San Carlos de Bariloche region and also on the Casino and the Hotel Provincial in Mar del Plata, designed for the city's growth as a new mass seaside resort.

His ideology was complex: he did not entirely reject democracy, but believed it was not being applied correctly. He praised the totalitarian regimes of Nazism and Italian fascism, whose busts adorned his office, and declared the Communist Party illegal. But he also proclaimed that his government was guided by the teachings of the Catholic Church through the encyclical Rerum Novarum. In line with that idea, he promoted the construction of affordable housing for workers, which mostly remained at the draft stage, and sought to force employers to pay better wages and a family wage.

In January 1940, with the agreement of the conservative leaders, Fresco named the local Avellaneda strongman Alberto Barceló as candidate for the governorship. The elections were not violent, but a finely tuned fraud machine led to a very broad conservative victory. Ortiz waited for the official proclamation and decreed federal intervention. As a result of his populist policy, the Buenos Aires ruling party did not even attempt to defend him.

Federal interventor Octavio R. Amadeo replaced Fresco and annulled the elections. Almost two years passed before a successor was chosen, and the office passed through the hands of Eleazar Videla, Enrique I. Rottjer and Dimas González Gowland, while the press mocked President Castillo, saying that he was looking for a candidate immoral enough to accept reaching the governorship through a new fraud. They finally found one: Rodolfo Moreno, who carried out the whole process, looked the other way when accusations of fraud mounted, and assumed the government in January 1942. Although his government carried out some works, his goal was nothing less than the presidency of the Nation. He sought to force Castillo to bless his candidacy, but all he achieved was to make an enemy of him. When he became convinced that he would not become president either with or against Castillo, he submitted his resignation in April 1943.

He was succeeded by Lieutenant Governor Edgardo J. Míguez, who barely had time to carry out any significant work or change: he was overthrown in June by the Revolution of 1943.

=== Córdoba ===
In Córdoba, Carlos Ibarguren, a conservative with some sympathy for Uriburu's corporatist ideas, was appointed de facto interventor; one year later he was replaced by Enrique Torino, a more classical liberal. Between them they expelled every radical they found from their posts or jobs. They also reduced the provincial budget from 14 to 12.6 million pesos, but by the end of their government a deficit of more than 7 million had already accumulated. As a result, Torino engaged in certain political heterodoxies, creating the Economic Council and the Economic Board. In the 1931 elections, the Emilio Olmos–Pedro J. Frías ticket prevailed, with almost 90% of the valid votes and radicalism abstaining.

Olmos died in April 1932, seventy days after taking office, without having achieved anything as governor. He was succeeded by Frías, who began an energetic government, benefiting workers through rent reductions, small farmers through differential taxes, and the unemployed, for whom he created a Labor Board responsible for carrying out some public works, the most notable of which was the road from the capital to Río Cuarto. During his government, the Catholic Church achieved a level of influence it had lost 50 years earlier: Catholic Action was founded, a Diocesan Eucharistic Congress was organized in preparation for the National Eucharistic Congress, and the diocese of Córdoba was promoted to the archdiocese of Córdoba, with the influential archbishop Fermín Lafitte in charge.

For the November 1935 elections, radicalism ended its abstention and won with its candidate Amadeo Sabattini, despite the violence deployed against him by the government supporters, the police and the Civic Legion, a fascist-style organization. Some conservatives wanted to annul the elections, but the attitude of the defeated candidate, José Aguirre Cámara, who showed himself willing from the first moment to accept defeat, dissuaded them. Sabattini, the best heir to the Yrigoyenist tradition, assumed the governorship in May. Among his first actions, he dismissed numerous conservatives from their public posts, although he kept most of them. He promoted tourism as one of the most productive activities in a climate of recession, supported the creation of the road from Córdoba to Buenos Aires, now National Route 9, and supported the national government in the initiatives it had planned for the province, such as the National Gunpowder and Explosives Factory and the Military Factory for Small-Arms Ammunition. Work began on large dams: La Viña, Cruz del Eje and San Roque.

President Ortiz pressed for the next elections: three days before they were held, Buenos Aires Province was placed under federal intervention due to the evident use of fraud. The elections were the cleanest of the decade and resulted in the victory of Santiago del Castillo, who took office in May 1940. His government did not have the brilliance of his predecessor's, but it continued his public works and political program. He was overthrown by the Revolution of 1943.

=== Santa Fe ===
The governor elected in 1928 in Santa Fe, Pedro Gómez Cello, did not have major conflicts with his opponents; nevertheless, he was not forgiven for having taken control of the province from them. On the day of the coup d'état, thousands of people celebrated in the streets, especially university students.

The successive federal interventors, Diego Saavedra, Guillermo Rothe and Alberto Arancibia Rodríguez, did everything possible to secure a conservative victory in the 1931 elections; but it was not enough: the candidate of the Democratic Progressive Party, Luciano Molinas, won comfortably. Among his government measures, he restored the provincial constitution of 1921, which had been rejected that same year by the radical governor. In 1933, a small group of revolutionaries led by the military officer Gregorio Pomar—who attempted the same and failed in Corrientes—tried to seize police headquarters; they were suppressed within minutes and left several dead. Otherwise, Molinas's government was among the best that could be achieved amid the economic crisis. Nevertheless, President Justo was not willing to tolerate an opposition government in a province as important as Santa Fe, so he requested and obtained from Congress federal intervention in the province. The government was taken over by the politically versatile engineer Manuel Ramón Alvarado, who throughout the decade held several federal interventions and ministerial posts; in Santa Fe he organized elections, while the Democratic Party organized blatant fraud, which resulted in the election of Manuel María de Iriondo, who assumed office in April 1937, more than a year and a half after Molinas's overthrow.

Iriondo was an aristocrat of radical origin, who had participated in the founding of the Argentine Patriotic League, which operated as a paramilitary group against trade unions. He was an ally of President Justo and had served as his Minister of Finance; he focused his efforts on balancing provincial and municipal accounts: by reducing spending in less visible areas, such as public employees' salaries, he achieved a fiscal surplus and also carried out public works, such as several provincial roads, municipal parks and hospitals. His successor, Joaquín Argonz, was a physician who created the Ministry of Public Health and Labor, promoted education, and established a type of pension fund for social assistance "for old age, disability, mothers and orphans", reflecting his concern for the social conditions of the poorest.

Provincial politics did not attract national attention until Iriondo was proposed as vice-presidential candidate on the ticket promoted by Castillo's government, which, in the view of the opposition and the Army, guaranteed the continuation of electoral fraud; this event precipitated the 1943 revolution, through which Argonz was deposed.

=== Tucumán ===
In Tucumán, the Yrigoyenists were also in power in 1930, when Governor José Graciano Sortheix was deposed. Federal interventors included Ramón S. Castillo, the future president, and Horacio Calderón. During their administrations, a decree by Uriburu was approved establishing variable tariffs on imported sugar, a measure that helped prevent a collapse in local prices of Tucumán's main product.

In the elections at the end of 1931, the leader of the Bandera Blanca party, Juan Luis Nougués, the respected last mayor of the capital before the coup, was elected. His term as governor was marked by conflicts with sugarcane growers, who—desperate over falling prices—violently opposed sugar taxes, reference prices, and marketing conditions. Market gardeners, students and trade unions also mobilized against him, managing to paralyze the city for three days. Increasingly isolated from Tucumán society, he also rejected measures passed by the National Congress, losing national support. In April 1934, conservatives bribed two Bandera Blanca legislators, securing enough seats to initiate impeachment proceedings against the governor. Two days later, President Justo requested and obtained federal intervention in the province.

For the following elections, the UCR again called for abstention, but a significant group of radicals refused, organized the Concurrencista UCR and ran with former governor Miguel Mario Campero as candidate, who narrowly won. Months later, radicalism ended abstention at the national level. Among his first measures was the transfer of the National University of Tucumán to national administration. Convinced that full employment was necessary to resolve the province's economic crisis, he enthusiastically promoted public works: he built 234 km of roads—considerable in such a small province—several bridges, some hospitals, forty-four schools, and initiated tenders for the El Cadillal Dam and the Escaba Dam. He attempted to regulate sugar production, which brought him considerable criticism. In 1938 he organized gubernatorial elections, which resulted in the election of Miguel Critto.

Critto continued the wave of public works: particularly notable was the road from Acheral to Amaicha del Valle via Tafí del Valle, a route that previously could only be traversed on muleback through the Quebrada del Portugués. He faced opposition from an electricity company, whose contract he declared void; the company appealed in court and obtained a ruling overturning the measure. The province responded by fining it for each verified tariff increase.

At the end of 1942, gubernatorial elections resulted in a virtual tie: Campero, seeking a third term, obtained 25 electors; the conservative Adolfo Piossek obtained 26; and the UCR National Committee obtained 2. Instead of quickly reaching an agreement with the latter, the two main candidates spent months disputing the quorum required in the Electoral College and challenging each other's electors, inflaming tensions and preventing a solution. President Castillo decided on federal intervention and, since no successor had been chosen when Critto's term ended, interventor Alberto Arancibia Rodríguez assumed control of both the governorship and the legislature.

Arancibia Rodríguez managed to call new elections and took no other administrative measures. On June 3, 1943, he boarded a train to Buenos Aires after handing over the intervention to his minister Forn. Upon arriving at Retiro station, however, he learned that the 1943 revolution had broken out and that Castillo had been deposed.

=== Entre Ríos ===
San Luis and Entre Ríos were the only provinces whose authorities were not overthrown by the 1930 coup: both were governed by conservative parties. In Entre Ríos, the antipersonalist radical Eduardo Laurencena governed, and his successor, Herminio Quirós, had already been elected. The coup and economic crisis prevented him from demonstrating his governing capacity during his eleven-month term, which ended with his death. The legislature then appointed its own authorities and called elections, resulting in the election of Luis Etchevehere, who took office on December 29, 1931; six days later, the Kennedy brothers attempted a Yrigoyenist uprising in La Paz and Concordia, quickly suppressed. During Etchevehere's term, the last vineyards in the province—once a successful industry—were eliminated and replaced with citrus plantations. The Bank of the Province of Entre Ríos was founded, and the provincial constitution was reformed, establishing women's suffrage, direct election of the governor, and the secular nature of the provincial state.

In the national elections of 1937, Entre Ríos was one of the provinces where electoral fraud was most blatant and violent. In the election for the successor to Governor Eduardo Tibiletti, who had replaced Etchevehere in 1935, fraud again prevailed; nevertheless, the opposition radical Enrique Mihura managed to win. During his administration, he promoted poultry farming, rice cultivation, and dairy production. He could not benefit from national industrial and public works programs, as President Castillo offered no cooperation to opposition governments. When the coup of June 4, 1943 broke out, he waited a week before handing over power to General Juan Carlos Sanguinetti; instead of simply stepping down, he barricaded himself in Government House, forcing troops to break in with axes to reach his office. He refused to sign the transfer document and was arrested for a few days.

=== Corrientes ===
Corrientes Province had been under federal intervention by President Yrigoyen since 1929; in reality, the deposed governor had done nothing to deserve it other than not being a radical. The dictatorship's intervention first passed through a lawyer named Gómez, and then to a young lawyer who had opposed the University Reform and would remain active in politics until the dictatorship of Eduardo Lonardi, named Atilio Dell'Oro Maini. He had to confront the uprising of Lieutenant Colonel Gregorio Pomar, which had been planned nationwide but succeeded only briefly in Corrientes: the military group occupied the capital and the nearby city of Resistencia, and during a dispute the leader himself killed a superior officer. With popular support, he held power for two days before fleeing to Paraguay.

Dell'Oro Maini organized elections, but these were canceled after Honorio Pueyrredón's victory in Buenos Aires; the dictatorship did not want surprises. When elections were finally held without radical participation, the Electoral College became entangled in conspiracies, making it impossible to elect a governor due to lack of quorum; only two and a half months after the first attempt was the goal achieved: the new governor was Pedro Numa Soto, from the antipersonalist radical faction.

Soto's term had to contend with chronic lack of funds. In 1933, an uprising of armed civilians broke out in Paso de los Libres; they were quickly surrounded and fled across the river into Brazil; among the participants was the intellectual Arturo Jauretche. Not all escaped: 40 dead and several wounded remained on the field. The next governor, Juan Francisco Torrent, an Autonomist with strong ties in Buenos Aires, implemented a successful public works policy: more than one thousand kilometers of roads were built with bridges, the Paso de los Libres–Uruguaiana international bridge was initiated in the presence of Brazilian president Getúlio Vargas, and telephone lines were extended throughout the province. While effective in infrastructure, he was far from democratic politically: he controlled elections through fraud, punished striking teachers severely—including imprisonment—and dismissed many of them.

Pedro Numa Soto was elected again as his successor, and spent his three-year term dealing with opposition attacks of all kinds: armed uprisings, bombings, press campaigns, and demands for federal intervention... ultimately he was removed through the latter means; in October 1942, federal interventor Francisco Ramón Galíndez, a compatriot and friend of President Castillo, took office. Less than a year later, both were overthrown by the Revolution of 1943.

== Political activity ==
The so-called "Infamous Decade" was a period of intense political activity. Clearly defined parties participated in elections, confronting one another and only occasionally cooperating. There was also strong activity by pressure groups, propaganda organizations and action groups, occupying positions across the ideological spectrum. This suggests that, although the coup reflected a significant portion of society's disillusionment with electoral democracy as it had functioned during the early radical governments, it did not resolve that discontent: intellectuals, activists and many ordinary citizens continued seeking alternative ways to reorganize the Argentine nation.

=== Political parties ===
Among the political parties, the one that set the political tempo and maintained the initiative was the National Democratic Party –the former conservatives– which was the party in the national government even though two of the presidents considered themselves antipersonalist radicals, and also held the vast majority of provincial governments. It was not a homogeneous party, but rather a sum of tendencies belonging to the conservative right, organized as an alliance among provincial forces. It was, above all, a party of notable figures, whether for their wealth, influence, or prestige; the president was a primus inter pares, even though Uriburu and Justo made a great effort to concentrate all power in themselves. The PDN formed a permanent alliance called Concordancia with the Antipersonalist Radical Civic Union and the Independent Socialist Party, two conservative liberal groups that exerted influence exclusively through the prestige of their leaders, and which never risked running in elections without the conservative umbrella.

In second place, the Radical Civic Union, which continually seemed on the verge of proving that it was a national majority, but in reality never achieved it: it came close in 1931 with the Buenos Aires election of Pueyrredón, and on some occasions defeated the machinery of fraud, such as in Córdoba and Tucumán. But of the several times it had the opportunity to run in elections without bans or arrests of its candidates, it only occasionally achieved victory, and never seriously threatened the regime. Moreover, the party was organized on a yrigoyenist basis with a few antipersonalist leaders at the top, beginning with Alvear.

Behind the two parties competing for power, the Socialist Party achieved some good electoral results and significant participation in Congress –it reached 43 deputies– but this only lasted while the radicals maintained abstention; once they returned to the electoral arena, voters preferred to vote for the UCR. The Democratic Progressive Party had presented itself as a liberal option to the conservatives in the 1910s, but quickly became focused on the province of Santa Fe; in the 1930s they followed the same path once again, and barely stood out slightly more for having –on a single occasion– won the governorship, and for the outstanding performance of De la Torre in the Senate. The Communist Party, on the other hand, which did not have comparable political activity and limited itself to following the directives of the Communist Party of the Soviet Union, had almost no electoral participation.

Outside the national parties, some provincial parties managed to transcend. This was not the case for the Lencinist Radical Civic Union in Mendoza, which lost influence and gradually faded away, unable to rival the democrats. By contrast, the Bloquist Radical Civic Union managed to install two governors in San Juan and carry out a progressive social and infrastructure policy –for example, they had the first woman legislator in the country's history– before the democrats burdened them with fraud, pressure, and violence, preventing them from accessing government. La Bandera Blanca, in Tucumán, had carried out an excellent municipal government before the economic crisis and the coup d'état, but when it had the opportunity to repeat this at the provincial level it did not know how to manage the economic crisis.

=== Ideological movements ===
Among ideological groups, one must first mention the groups within the Argentine University Federation, where those who wished to continue the University Reform under the conditions in which the country found itself had to confront those who argued that such Reform made no sense unless it was preceded by or led to a comprehensive reform of society; this group included, for example, Héctor P. Agosti and Ernesto Sábato. Outside both groups, the Frente de Afirmación del Nuevo Orden Espiritual sought a spiritualist solution to the crisis; among its members were Saúl Taborda, Carlos Astrada, José Babini, José Luis Romero, Jorge Romero Brest, Jordán Bruno Genta and Alberto Baldrich, each of whom later pursued different intellectual paths.

On the left, outside party structures and focused on intellectual production, Deodoro Roca and Saúl Taborda stood out, carrying out all the intellectual work that the Communist Party refused to do.

Perhaps the most influential intellectual group was the Fuerza de Orientación Radical de la Joven Argentina (FORJA), initially part of the UCR and later becoming independent to form within a non-fascist nationalism and participate in all the debates of the following four decades; among its members were Raúl Scalabrini Ortiz, Homero Manzi, Gabriel del Mazo, Luis Dellepiane, Héctor Maya, Atilio García Mellid and Arturo Jauretche.

The far right, which had its moment during Uriburu's presidency, was initially more identified with the dictatorship of Miguel Primo de Rivera in Spain than with fascism and Nazism. The most important groups were the Argentine Civic Legion and the Alianza de la Juventud Nacionalista. However, fascism and Nazism advanced slowly throughout the entire period, and only became more cautious with the outbreak of the Second World War. Basically, they were composed of a narrow intellectual leadership –drawn equally from all political parties– and a large universe of activists devoted to parades with uniforms and insignia and to street fighting, which became all too frequent.

=== Pressure groups ===
Among pressure groups, trade unionism must be mentioned first: a few days after the coup d'état, the General Confederation of Labour (CGT) was founded, with the aim of replacing all workers' centers, which it eventually achieved. Nevertheless, the labor movement remained divided into two major groups: the socialists –very active and successful in the labor field, but whom the PS always prevented from competing against the party leadership, composed mainly of lawyers and doctors– and the former anarchists, who had evolved into a "syndicalist" movement, that is, centered on labor demands and without political ambitions. When the socialists attempted to take over the CGT, the latter re-founded the Unión Sindical Argentina (USA).

A second fundamental pressure group in this period was the Catholic Church, which reached its highest level of influence since colonial times and defended the so-called "myth of the Catholic nation", convinced that the definitive victory over secularism was within reach. Although the founding of the Acción Católica Argentina seemed to invite laypeople to take charge of defending the Church, all visible Catholic action was in the hands of a clergy with internal prestige far superior to its predecessors: bishops such as Gustavo Franceschi and Santiago Copello, or priests such as Leonardo Castellani and Julio Meinvielle were true stars of Catholic intellectual life.

The third major pressure group was the Argentine Army, and almost exclusively the Army: the influence of the Navy had declined considerably, because it had a blindly Anglophile training, and because the political action of its officers was not considered necessary by the United Kingdom, which controlled the head of state. In contrast, Army officers, who for decades had been inspired by German military academies, oscillated between the largely Anglophile stance of the upper classes, professional militarism—largely abandoned after the coup—and nationalism. Within the nationalist sector, there was a sizeable minority inclined toward the far right, including sympathies for fascism, Francoism and the most extreme Nazism. The Army, which had proclaimed for decades its absolute political neutrality and professionalism, had fully entered politics with the 1930 coup and remained a pressure group to be reckoned with. Some active officers formed far-right pressure groups, such as generals Juan Bautista Molina, Juan Carlos Sanguinetti and Emilio Kinkelín. Among senior officers with a lesser degree of sympathy for the far right—but undoubtedly admirers of its external forms, rhetoric and parades—were General Pedro Pablo Ramírez and Lieutenant Colonel Juan Domingo Perón. More than the generals, who had purely political concerns and interests, a generation of mid-ranking officers had emerged dissatisfied with the institutional degradation of the Army and the State, and deeply concerned about the prevailing corruption and fraud, and about the possibility that Argentine governments, uncritically following British and U.S. interests, might drag Argentina into a war in which they argued the country had no interest. In March 1943, a group of colonels and lieutenant colonels, including Perón, founded the GOU –which could stand for either Grupo de Oficiales Unidos or Grupo Obra de Unificación– and which would play a leading role in the coup d'état less than three months later and in the dictatorship that emerged from it.

== June 1943 coup ==
On 4 June 1943, the nationalist faction of the army, gathered around the Grupo de Oficiales Unidos (GOU, formed in March 1943) opposed both to corruption and to the Conservative government, overthrew Castillo in a coup. Composed under the initiative of the colonel Miguel A. Montes and Urbano de la Vega, the GOU included as main members the colonel Juan Domingo Perón and Enrique P. González. Sympathisers of Nazi Germany and Fascist Italy, the GOU established General Pedro Ramírez as chief of state, despite a short attempt by General Arturo Rawson to claim the office.

== Presidents of the Infamous Decade ==
- José Félix Uriburu (1930–1932)
- Agustín Pedro Justo (1932–1938)
- Roberto Marcelino Ortiz (1938–1940)
- Ramón S. Castillo (1940–1943)

== Art, music and literature ==
=== The golden age of tango ===
The year 1930 finds Carlos Gardel at the height of his fame, which largely overshadowed other tango musicians; his death in an air accident during an international tour was a great loss, but allowed the "new guard" of tango to become visible, which in a few years would reach its "golden age", with the definitive consecration of Francisco Canaro and other renowned bandleaders, beginning with Julio de Caro, the renovator of the 1920s, who would still introduce new sounds and compositional styles, and Osvaldo Fresedo, whose popularity did not decline. Larger orchestras also appeared, with new creative turns, such as those of Juan D'Arienzo, Juan de Dios Filiberto, and—above all—Aníbal Troilo. From the late 1930s and early 1940s, Osvaldo Pugliese and Ángel D'Agostino joined. There was also the consecration of singers such as Agustín Magaldi and Ignacio Corsini.

It was also the time of great poets such as Enrique Santos Discépolo and Homero Manzi, who not only gave great depth to tango lyrics but were also politically engaged figures, as well as Pascual Contursi and Homero Espósito. The popularity of female performers also grew: Sofía Bozán continued her successful career begun in the previous period, joined by Azucena Maizani, Tania, Libertad Lamarque, Tita Merello, Ada Falcón, Juanita Larrauri and Nelly Omar.

This entire explosion was only possible due to the widespread use of radio. Radio stations typically broadcast three types of programs, alternating airtime: radio drama, music—almost exclusively tango and milonga—and news bulletins, the latter much more concise than in later years. Outside radio, cinema emerged as a new medium of diffusion, which had already developed abroad for decades, but in Argentina produced its first sound feature film in 1933, which—significantly—was simply called ¡Tango!.

Returning to 1935, the funeral of Carlos Gardel reached epic proportions, and—together with the Eucharistic Congress—initiated the large mass gatherings that would characterize popular mobilization for the next half century.

Meanwhile, in the interior provinces, folk music had already taken its first steps in local dissemination and stylistic organization through Andrés Chazarreta, but it would take some time for its renewal and national diffusion. However, toward the end of the period the first folk stars emerged, with Atahualpa Yupanqui, the Ávalos brothers and Buenaventura Luna, who took refuge in Buenos Aires after fleeing a prison in San Juan Province.

=== Literature ===
During most of the period, literature was divided into two literary movements; some testimonies claim that the formation of these movements was more of a joke or irony about the abundance of rival movements in Europe. But the division that officially took place in Argentina—more specifically in Buenos Aires—had a real basis: the Florida Group was composed of upper-class writers more interested in form than message, and who looked more toward Europe than toward their country's social reality. The Boedo Group, on the other hand, was composed of writers from the middle class, who were more concerned with social denunciation than aesthetic formalism.

The Florida Group, which published its works and opinions in Martín Fierro magazine—and its aesthetic successors after the group dissolved and the magazine ceased publication—included authors such as Ricardo Güiraldes, Jorge Luis Borges, Adolfo Bioy Casares, Manuel Mujica Láinez, Oliverio Girondo, Leopoldo Marechal, Raúl González Tuñón, Conrado Nalé Roxlo, Abelardo Arias and Silvina Bullrich. In general, they supported the Concordancia governments and Argentina's entry into the war on the side of the Allies. After Lugones's suicide in 1938, this group hastened to consecrate Borges as the most prominent living writer.

The Boedo Group, which published through Editorial Claridad, included among its members Leónidas Barletta, César Tiempo, Elías Castelnuovo, Raúl González Tuñón, Roberto Mariani, Álvaro Yunque, Roberto Arlt—who died in 1942—Enrique Amorim and Eduardo Mallea.

At the beginning of the period, Horacio Quiroga, Lugones, Ezequiel Martínez Estrada and Gustavo Martínez Zuviría were still active, the latter perhaps the most prominent of the antisemitic and pro-fascist writers.

=== Visual arts ===
Despite the death of artists as renowned as the Córdoba landscape painter Fernando Fader, the period was especially rich and full of renewals and changes. Among painters, the Paris Group, formed in the previous period, reached its creative peak; its members included Emilio Pettoruti, Juan del Prete and Xul Solar, continuing the surrealist work of the Catalan Juan Batlle Planas. Outside this group, Raúl Soldi, Lino Enea Spilimbergo, Raquel Forner and Antonio Berni were already established artists, but reached stylistic maturity in this period. Later, the Orion Group appeared, with neo-romantic painters with surrealist details, such as Vicente Forte and Bruno Venier.

This was also a period in which socially inspired painting gained new strength, with works inspired by the social conditions of the poorest, especially notable in Antonio Berni, and to a lesser extent in Spilimbergo. Among illustrators of this trend, Juan Carlos Castagnino began to stand out, who also engaged in painting, and especially Benito Quinquela Martín, the painter of the neighborhood and port of La Boca, and of workers at their jobs.

Among non-figurative painters, those dedicated to geometric forms predominated, such as Arden Quin and Gyula Kósice.

Among sculptors, the figure of Rogelio Yrurtia had no equal, despite the importance of the works of José Fioravanti, Alberto Lagos and Pablo Curatella Manes.

== Bibliography ==
- Aguinaga, Carlos; Azaretto, Roberto (1991). Ni Década Ni Infame, del 30' al 43'. Buenos Aires: Baudino. p. 303. ISBN 9509974838.
- Gisela Cramer, "Argentine Riddle. The Pinedo Plan of 1940 and the Political Economy of the Early War Years", Journal of Latin American Studies, 30 (October 1998), pp. 519–550
- Gisela Cramer, "Pre-peronist Argentina and the Origins of IAPI", in: Iberoamericana Vol. 2, No. 5 (2002), pp. 55–78.
- Ferrero, Roberto A. (1976). Del fraude a la soberanía popular. 1938-1946. Memorial de la Patria. La Bastilla.
- Ferrero, Roberto A. (1980). Historia crítica del movimiento obrero argentino. La Bastilla.
- Jauretche, Arturo (1983) [1977]. FORJA y la Década Infame. Peña Lillo.
- Nállim, Jorge. "Between the Local and the Transnational: New Historiographical Approaches on Argentine Political History, 1930 to 1943." Estudios Interdisciplinarios de América Latina y el Caribe 25.1 (2014): 103–120.
- Juan José Llach, "El Plan Pinedo de 1940, su significado histórico y los orígenes de la economía política del peronismo", Desarrollo Económico (January–March 1984)
- Pigna, Felipe (2006). Los Mitos de la Historia Argentina (3rd ed.). Planeta.
- Potash, Robert A. (1986) [1969]. El Ejército y la política en la Argentina. Hyspamérica.
- Sanguinetti, Horacio (1977). La democracia ficta. 1930-1938. Memorial de la Patria. La Bastilla.
- Torres, José Luis (1973) [1945]. La Década Infame. Freeland.
