= Arturo Jauretche =

Argentine writer and politician (1901-1974

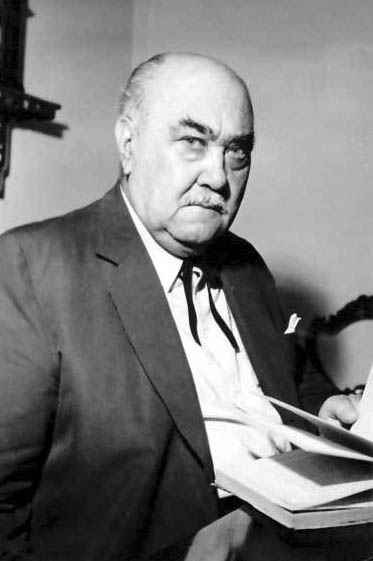
- Born: November 13, 1901
- Died: May 25, 1974 (aged 72)
- Occupations: writer, politician, and philosopher

Arturo Martín Jauretche (Lincoln, Buenos Aires, November 13, 1901 – Buenos Aires, May 25, 1974) was an Argentine writer, politician, and philosopher.

== Early years ==
Jauretche spent his childhood and adolescence in the city of Lincoln before moving to Buenos Aires. He sympathized with the new model of social integration promoted by the Radical Civic Union and allied himself with the radical faction of Hipólito Yrigoyen, the so-called personalistas. He was influenced by the poet and Tango lyricist Homero Manzi, whose working-class appeal struck Jauretche, himself of rural origin, as a positive political strategy.

In 1928, when Yrigoyen assumed his second mandate following the interlude of Marcelo T. de Alvear, Jauretche was appointed to the civil service, though it was not long before the Argentine army unseated Yrigoyen in a coup, setting off the Década Infame. Jauretche joined the armed struggle against the coup, and subsequently opposed the regime with intense political action. In 1933, in the province of Corrientes, he took part in a failed uprising led by Colonels Francisco Bosch and Gregorio Pomar.

Jauretche was imprisoned for his role in the uprising. In prison, he wrote a poetic account of the episode in the gauchesque style, titling the work Paso de los Libres. It was published in 1934 with a prologue by Jorge Luis Borges, with whom Jauretche differed markedly in political matters.

== FORJA ==
Jauretche's clash with Alvear's leading faction quickly radicalized him. When Alvear decided in 1934 to abandon the UCR's policy of abstentionism, a significant portion of the left split from the party. Along with Manzi, Luis Dellepiane, Gabriel del Mazo, Manuel Ortiz Pereyra and others, Jauretche founded FORJA (an acronym for Fuerza de Orientación Radical de la Joven Argentina), which pursued a democratic nationalist ideology equally opposed to conservative nationalism and to the economic liberal policies of Agustín P. Justo. Marginalized by the partisan political system, FORJA expressed its positions mainly through street demonstrations and self-published literature known as Cuadernos de FORJA, or FORJA Notebooks.

In them, FORJA criticized the government's measures, beginning with the Roca-Runciman Treaty. They argued that the Central Bank had been founded to solidify British control of the Argentine monetary and financial system, and that the Transport Corporation had been established to allow British railways to operate without competition. FORJA opposed the breaking off of relations with the Soviet Union, on the basis that the Soviet bloc was a major potential market for Argentine agricultural exports. They alleged that Justo's government had abused the policy of federal intervention to punish provinces where anti-government parties had enjoyed electoral success, and blamed Justo for dropping wages and rising unemployment. One of FORJA's fundamental principles was the maintenance of Argentine neutrality in the run-up to the Second World War, and it was the only party to adopt this position.

Around 1940 Jauretche broke with Dellepiane and del Mazo, who realigned themselves with the UCR. FORJA became further radicalized, and shifted towards more nationalistic positions. Raúl Scalabrini Ortiz, who had always shared a similar ideology, affiliated himself with the party, and along with Jauretche formed a double leadership. He departed in 1943, leaving Jauretche in control. He vehemently opposed the government of Ramón Castillo. Although he was skeptical of the motives of the coup that unseated Castillo, his firm neutrality with regard to the war led him to welcome the government of Pedro Pablo Ramírez. When the Grupo de Oficiales Unidos unseated Ramírez after he severed relations with the Rome-Berlin-Tokyo Axis, Jauretche allied himself with the up-and-coming Colonel Juan Domingo Perón.

== Perón's government ==
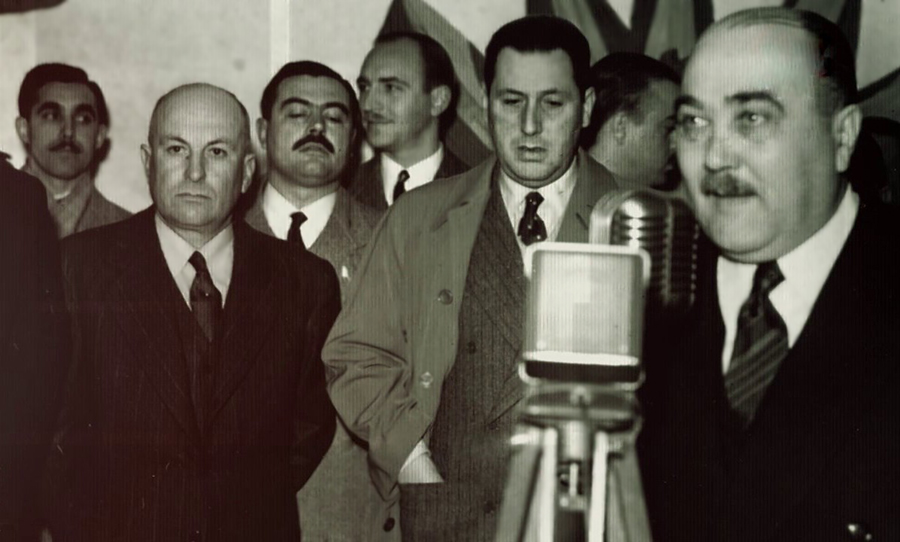
Jauretche (right) with Juan Perón

Though he was always critical of it, Jauretche supported Peronism after October 17, 1945. With the support of Domingo Mercante, governor of Buenos Aires Province, he was named president of the Bank of the Province of Buenos Aires in 1946. He would hold the position until 1951, when Mercante's falling out with Perón led Jauretche to abandon it.

== Opposition to Aramburu and exile ==
Jauretche did not return to the public scene until 1955, when the Revolución Libertadora led to Perón's ouster. Having been out of government for a few years meant that, for once, he was able to avoid political persecution. He founded the periodical El Líder and the weekly El '45 to defend what he called "the ten years of popular government", and to excoriate the political, economic, and social activities of the de facto regime. In 1956 he published the essay El Plan Prebisch: retorno al coloniaje ("The Prebisch Plan: a return to colonialism"), refuting the report written by Raúl Prebisch, secretary of the Economic Commission of Latin America, at the behest of Pedro Eugenio Aramburu. The harshness of his opposition led him to be exiled to Montevideo.

There in 1957 he published Los profetas del odio (The prophets of hate), a polemical study of class relations in Argentina since the rise of Peronism. In it he criticized various conceptions of Argentine political history which had enjoyed favor, in particular that of Ezequiel Martínez Estrada. Estrada had previously subjected Argentine history to a bio-sociological analysis in his Radiografía de la pampa, which resembled Sarmiento's Facundo, in its suggestion that the Argentine geography had imposed upon its inhabitants a life disconnected from the flow of history. In his subsequent work ¿Qué es esto? he presented a devastating critique of Peronism, in which he portrayed Perón as a "snake charmer" whose political movement had instigated the "low passions of the populace", corruption, and "pornocracy". Jauretche criticized these allusions as the prejudices of a middle class sensibility irritated by the eruption of new participants in a political environment which had been exclusively run by the bourgeoisie since the generación del '80. Although bourgeois material interests had been advanced by the development of a dense layer of consumers, they nevertheless remained reticent towards the habits of the working classes, a "myopia" which Jauretche would criticize frequently. He also challenged, in a friendly letter to the scientist and writer Ernesto Sábato, the notion that the middle classes had embraced Peronism out of resentment towards the wealthy:

What drove the masses to Perón was not resentment, but hope. Recall the crowds in October of '45, who took over the city for two days, who didn't break a single window and whose greatest crime was washing feet in the Plaza de Mayo... Recall those crowds, even in tragic times, and you will recall that they always sang together — something very unusual for us — and they remain such singers today, but have been banned by decree from singing. They were not resentful. They were happy criollos because they were willing to throw away their sandals to buy shoes and even books and records, to take vacations, to meet in restaurants, to be sure of bread and a place to live, to live something like the "western" life which was denied to them even then.

— Jauretche, Los profetas del odio

Jauretche's proposal was one of integration, whereby the common interest of the bourgeoisie and proletariat would be served by the development of a solid national economy. This position, which was difficult to reconcile with the populism of Peronism, attracted the enmity both of economic liberals and the justicialist leadership. In Los profetas del odio, Jauretche identified the chief enemies of national development as the liberal and cosmopolitan intelligentsia, whose fascination with European culture led them to apply European solutions uncritically to Argentine problems, without consideration for historical differences and the continents' distinct places in the international community.

== Jauretche and revisionism ==
Jauretche combined his own interpretation of contemporary reality with the nascent techniques of historical revisionism. Although revisionist authors had been advocating a reinterpretation of Argentine history — in opposition to the canonical vision of Bartolomé Mitre and Sarmiento which had represented the nation's development in terms of a clash between civilization and barbarism — since at least the 1930s, it was not until the Revolución Libertadora that major parallels began to be drawn between Perón and Juan Manuel de Rosas. When Aramburu's supporters declared the coup against Perón "a new Caseros", the revisionists rose to the challenge, portraying Caseros as the beginning of a historical disaster that the government of Rosas had kept at bay through a policy that united the interests of disparate social classes.

In previous decades, when the national identity had been based on the simultaneous opposition to British capital and European immigration, historical revisionism had been allied with the conservative nationalism of the creole aristocracy. The upper classes soon came to adopt a liberal economic and social outlook, and the work of Jauretche and the Forjistas proved pivotal in realigning historical revisionism with populism, taking in the struggle the labor movement and the montonera tradition. In Perón's government, this spirit of reform was stifled by pragmatic considerations, a situation predicted by José María Rosa and others. Subsequently the politicization of historical interpretation would become more evident, in keeping with the profound cultural and political radicalization that characterized the period.

In 1959 Jauretche published National Policy and Historical Revisionism, in which he elaborated on his own place at the center of the deeply divided revisionist movement, speaking as much about the grass-roots movement he made possible as about actual historical questions. Though he painted a fairly sympathetic portrait of Rosas, described as the only "possible synthesis" of the problems facing his time, Jauretche was fairly critical of the federal caudillos of the interior; in this analysis, Jauretche distinguished himself from the position of Jorge Abelardo Ramos, Rodolfo Puiggrós, and Rodolfo Ortega Peña, who were at the time critical of Rosas's ideology, which they understood as an attenuated version of Porteño centralism, and deeply fearful of the atavistic foundations of traditional nationalism, in which they perceived no small similarities with Fascism. In the struggle between revisionism and anti-revisionism, which in a large part was a division between left and right, Jauretche left no doubt as to his allegiance with the former.

Meanwhile, in pursuit of whatever means would most quickly bring about the end of the Revolución Libertadora, Jauretche broke with Perón one last time and endorsed the candidacy of Arturo Frondizi, whereas Peronists adopted abstentionism, the technique traditionally used by the Radical Civic Union. Nevertheless, after Frondizi's election, Jauretche was severely critical of his development program and his pursuit of foreign investment, particularly with respect to petroleum. In 1961, during a bitterly contested election in which the Peronist vote was divided among various candidates, Jauretche endorsed the socialist Alfredo Palacios.

== Writing ==
When his political career was cut short, Jauretche returned to literature. During the 1960s he published frequently and prolifically, contributing to journals and periodicals as well as releasing highly successful collections of essays. In 1962 he published Forja y la Década Infame, two years later Filo, contrafilo y punta, and in 1966 El medio pelo en la sociedad Argentina, a probing inquisition of the role of the middle class which immediately elicited a strong reaction. A supporter of the Confederación General del Trabajo de los Argentinos, he took part in the syndicate's Comisión de Afirmación Nacional.

== Works ==
- 1934: El Paso de los Libres. Prologue by Jorge Luis Borges. Republished in 1960 with a prologue by Jorge Abelardo Ramos.
- 1956: El Plan Prebisch: retorno al coloniaje.
- 1957: Los profetas del Odio y la Yapa.
- 1958: Ejército y Política.
- 1959: Política Nacional y Revisionismo Histórico.
- 1960: Prosas de Hacha y Tiza.
- 1962: Forja y la Década Infame.
- 1964: Filo, Contrafilo y Punta.
- 1966: El Medio Pelo en la Sociedad Argentina.
- 1968: Manual de Zonceras Argentinas.
- 1969: Mano a Mano entre Nosotros.
