= Robustiano Patrón Costas =

Argentine politician and businessman

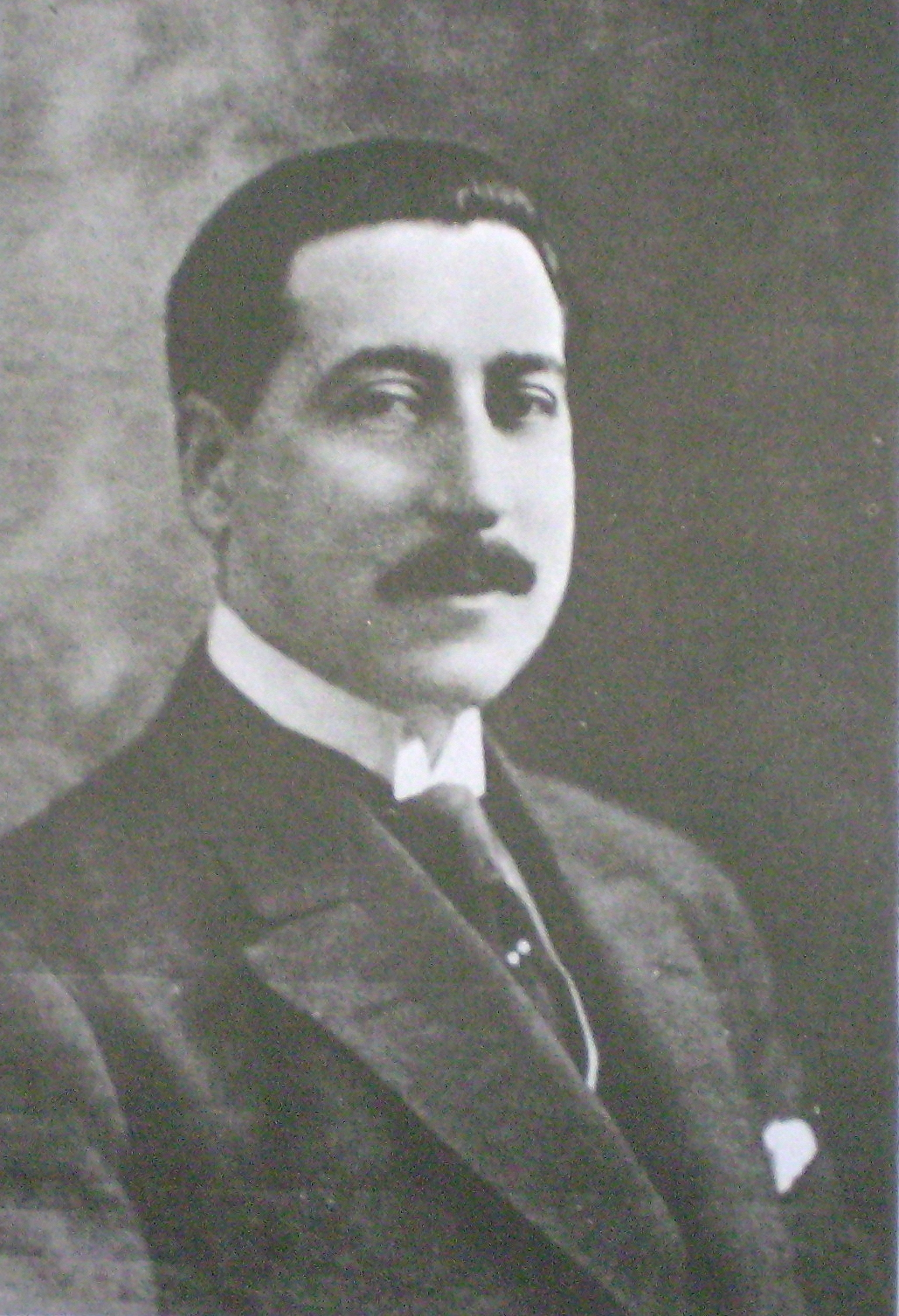
Robustiano Patrón Costas

Robustiano Patrón Costas (August 5, 1878 – September 24, 1965) was an Argentine politician and businessman who served as Governor of Salta Province. He led the National Democratic Party.

== Biography ==
Patrón Costas was born in Salta to Francisca Costas Figueroa and Robustiano Patrón. He studied law at the University of Buenos Aires, receiving his doctorate in 1901.

The following year, Patrón Costas was appointed minister of works for Salta Province by Governor Ángel Zerda, and in 1912, he served as the head of government for Governor Avelino Figueroa. He was appointed to complete Figueroa's term as governor from 1913 to 1916. In 1916, Patrón Costas was elected as a National Democrat to the Argentine Senate, serving until 1925, when he returned to Salta's provincial legislature as president of the Senate. He was re-elected to the national Senate in 1932 and again in 1938. As the Provisional President of the Senate he briefly served as interim president of Argentina in the early 1940s.

He was close to President Ramón Castillo and a leading figure in the governing Concordancia. In 1942 he was announced as the government's candidate to succeed the president. His candidacy proved widely unpalatable, however: the wealthy Patrón Costas was a synonym for the staunchly conservative provincial aristocracies that maintained Northern Argentina in a quasi-feudal state, and there were widespread rumors that the government planned a massive fraud to install him as president, as part of a trend that had started in 1931. A coup in 1943 put an end to Castillo's government and Patrón Costas' candidacy.

As a businessman, Patrón Costas' name is often associated with the sugar industry. In 1918 he and his brother founded the sugar refinery Ingenio San Martín de Tabacal in Orán Department which at one time was one of the largest in the Western hemisphere. The company is owned by the Seaboard Corporation.

Patrón Costas worked with the Archbishop of Salta, Roberto Tavella, to establish the Catholic University of Salta, a private university. He was awarded a knighthood in the Pontifical Order of St. Gregory the Great by Pope Paul VI.
