= Atilio Cattáneo =

20th century Argentine politician and political activist

Atilio Esteban Cattáneo
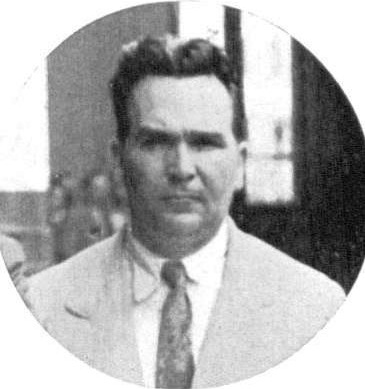

Deputy in the Chamber of Deputies
- In office 4 June 1946 – 12 December 1949

Personal details
- Born: 15 October 1889 Lobos, Buenos Aires Province, Argentina
- Died: 22 June 1957 (aged 67) Buenos Aires, Argentina
- Party: Radical Civic Union
- Education: Colegio Militar de la Nación
- Profession: military, aviator, political activist

Atilio Esteban Cattáneo (15 October 1889 – 22 June 1957) was an Argentine soldier and politician, a pioneer of aviation in his country and who served as a national deputy in opposition to Peronism.

== Biography ==
=== Education and early career ===
Cattáneo was born on 15 October 1889, in Lobos, Argentina and graduated from Argentina's officers' college in 1910 as a Communications Engineer. Shortly after graduating as a military aviator, he was a pilot for Brazilian aviation pioneer Alberto Santos-Dumont during his 1916 visit to Argentina. After joining the Army General Staff, he joined Argentina's Military Geographic Institute (Instituto Geográfico Nacional).

=== Political activism ===
He identified with the Radical Civic Union at the start of Hipólito Yrigoyen's second presidency in 1928 and took part in the army's reorganisation. Cattáneo tried to defend Yrigoyen during the 1930 Argentine coup d'état, which led to him being discharged from the military when José Félix Uriburu came to power.

In December of the following year, Lieutenant Colonel Gregorio Pomar organised a revolution attempt. This was followed by a second attempt to recover democracy in 1932, led by Cattáneo and Major Regino Lascano, spurred on by election fraud and the banning of some political activity. The plans were discovered two days before they were expected to start, leading to the arrest of Cattáneo, deposed president Yrigoyen, and others. Most of the political leaders were shortly released, but Cattáneo was given a long prison sentence. During this period, Cattáneo authored two books, which were released in 1935 and 1939. In 1937, he was part of the Argentine League for the Rights of Man, which sought constitutional legality.

When the 1943 Argentine coup d'état broke out, Cattáneo asked to be reinstated into the army with simultaneous retirement. Initially, he aligned with the new dictatorship, which he identified as being responsible for ending the Infamous Decade. Refusing to abandon radicalism and being opposed to Juan Perón, he was elected to the Argentine Chamber of Deputies in 1946 as part of the Block of 44 radicals. At the end of 1949, Cattáneo accused Perón of lying about his assets, offering to buy the president's house for the value that was declared. In response, Cattáneo was expelled from the Chamber of Deputies and was stripped of his military status.

=== Retirement ===
Following his expulsion from the Chamber of Deputies, Cattáneo retired from political activity and devoted himself to literature and playwriting. He died in Buenos Aires on 22 June 1957. Several schools and streets in Argentina are named for him.
