= Raúl Scalabrini Ortiz =

Argentine writer, journalist, and essayist

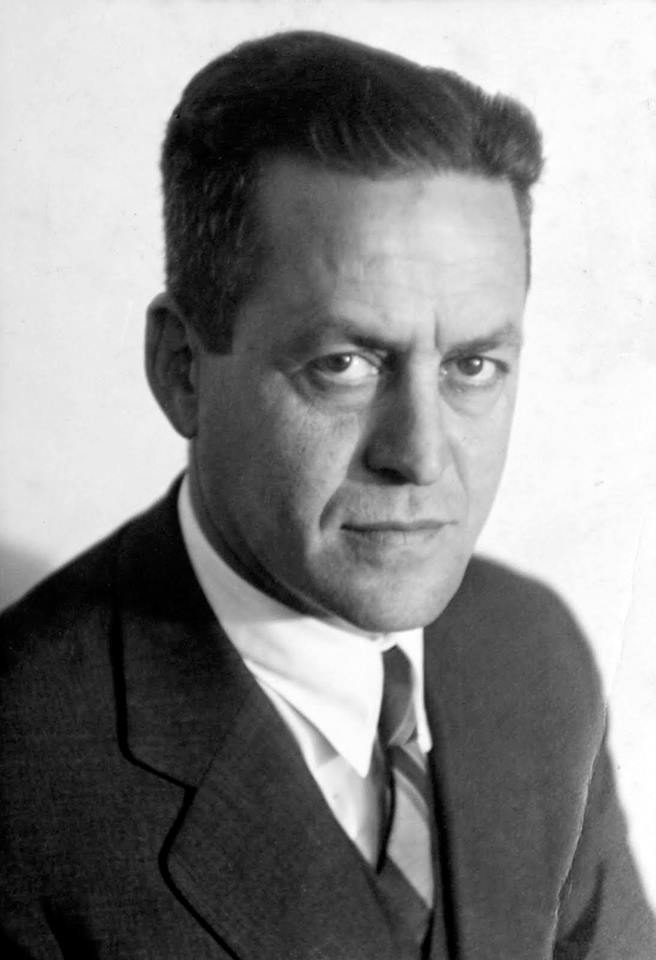
- Born: February 14, 1898; Corrientes, Argentina
- Died: May 30, 1959 (aged 61); Buenos Aires, Argentina
- Occupations: writer, journalist, essayist, poet

Raúl Scalabrini Ortiz (February 14, 1898 – May 30, 1959) was an Argentine writer, philosopher, journalist, essayist and poet, friend of Arturo Jauretche and Homero Manzi, and loosely associated with the political group Fuerza de Orientación Radical de la Joven Argentina (FORJA).

Scalabrini Ortiz was born in Corrientes, the son of the naturalist Pedro Scalabrini, who was the director of the museum of the city of Paraná, Entre Ríos. He studied at the University of Buenos Aires in the Faculty of Exact Sciences and became a land surveyor; then he moved to Buenos Aires and got involved in the literary conflicts of the Boedo and Florida groups. In 1923 he started writing short stories, collected in a book, La Manga; he was then a journalist for the newspapers La Nación, El Mundo and Noticias Gráficas, and founded and directed Reconquista.

In his youth, Scalabrini Ortiz participated in a Marxist group called Insurrexit; he also travelled to several provinces for work reasons, and at 26 he visited Paris, France, from where he returned disappointed by the xenophobic attitude of its citizens. Like everyone in Argentina, he felt the effects of the Great Depression, and then saw the coup d'état against president Hipólito Yrigoyen that began the Década Infame, marked by conservative rule perpetuated by electoral fraud.

During the 1930s he wrote to denounce the exploitation of Argentina for the benefit of the oligarchy and foreign interests. From its foundation in 1935 onwards, he was linked to FORJA (Fuerza de Orientación Radical de la Joven Argentina, "Force of Radical Orientation of the Young Argentina"; the acronym also means "forge" in Spanish), an internal offshoot of the Radical Civic Union.

Together with Arturo Jauretche, Scalabrini Ortiz is considered a pioneer of historical revisionism in Argentina, a fervently nationalistic and anti-liberal current of historiography that became especially influential in the 1960s.

By 1942, Scalabrini Ortiz was jobless. He had to resort to a newspaper classified ad to earn a living, noting that he possessed an ample general culture, experience and knowledge in many fields. He finally returned to his original occupation as a surveyor, and continued working when he died in Buenos Aires in 1959, at the age of 61. He is buried in the Recoleta Cemetery. An avenue in the city of Buenos Aires is named in his honor.

== Works and quotes ==
Perhaps the work that better defines Scalabrini Ortiz is the "Five principles of inner cooperation" (Cinco principios de cooperación interna). These principles he describes in the following manner:

1. Principle of the collective man, because the will of the number, which is like the surname of the collectivity, must be above the individuality. Not the wealth nor the wit or wisdom have the right to silent or mock the great voice of the necessity of the each collective group, which is the voice that best approximates the will of destiny.
2. Principle of the man's comprehension, for this complex unity to be always present with its biological, moral, intellectual and spiritual necessities, and for the human reality never to be sacrificed to an abstract norm or a scheme without life.
3. Principle of the protection of the weakest, to abolish the 'Law of the Jungle' and establish a real possibility of equality. Everything that is not legislated, is implicitly legislated in favour of the strong. The theoretical equality is a practical inequality in favour of the powerful.
4. Principle of natural resources, because the property is a delegation of the power of a collective organization that made it possible and supports it.
5. Principle of the collective utility of the profit, so that nobody has the right to obtain benefits of activities to the detriment of or useless to the society, and therefore all profit or benefit of the product of somebody else's mind or the fruitless retention of a good, must be considered null and illicit since they don't originate in the own work nor genius.

In his journalistic articles and flyers, Scalabrini Ortiz tried to show the general public what he had learned by investigating. In one article he advised the reader:

"These matters of economy and finance are so simple that they are within reach of any child. They only require knowledge of addition and subtraction. When you do not understand something, ask until you do understand. If you do not understand, it is because they are trying to steal from you. When you understand that, you will already have learned how to defend the motherland on the immaterial order of economic and financial concepts."

== Bibliography ==
- La Manga, 1923 (stories)
- El hombre que está solo y espera, 1931
- La Gaceta de Buenos Aires, 1934 (newspaper articles)
- Señales, 1935 (newspaper articles)
- Política Británica en el Río de la Plata, 1936 (FORJA notebook)
- Los ferrocarriles, factor primordial de la independencia nacional, 1937 (flyer)
- El petróleo argentino, 1938 (FORJA notebook)
- Historia del Ferrocarril Central Córdoba, 1938 (FORJA notebook)
- Historia de los Ferrocarriles, 1938 (Servir magazine)
- Historia del Primer Empréstito, 1939 (FORJA notebook)
- Reconquista, 1939 (newspaper articles)
- Política británica en el Río de la Plata, 1940
- Historia de los Ferrocarriles Argentinos, 1940
- La gota de agua, 1942 (flyer)
- Los ferrocarriles deben ser del pueblo argentino, 1946
- Defendamos los ferrocarriles del Estado, 1946 (flyer)
- Tierra sin nada, tierra de profetas, 1946 (poetry and essays)
- Yrigoyen y Perón, identidad de una línea histórica, 1948 (flyer)
- El capital, el hombre y la propiedad en la vieja y la nueva Constitución Argentina, 1948 (flyer)
- Perspectivas para una esperanza Argentina, 1950 (flyer)
- El Líder, El Federalista, De Frente, 1955/56 (newspaper articles)
- Aquí se aprende a defender a la Patria, 1957 (flyer)
- Qué, 1957/58 (newspaper articles)
