= Emar Acosta =

Argentinian lawyer (1900–1965)

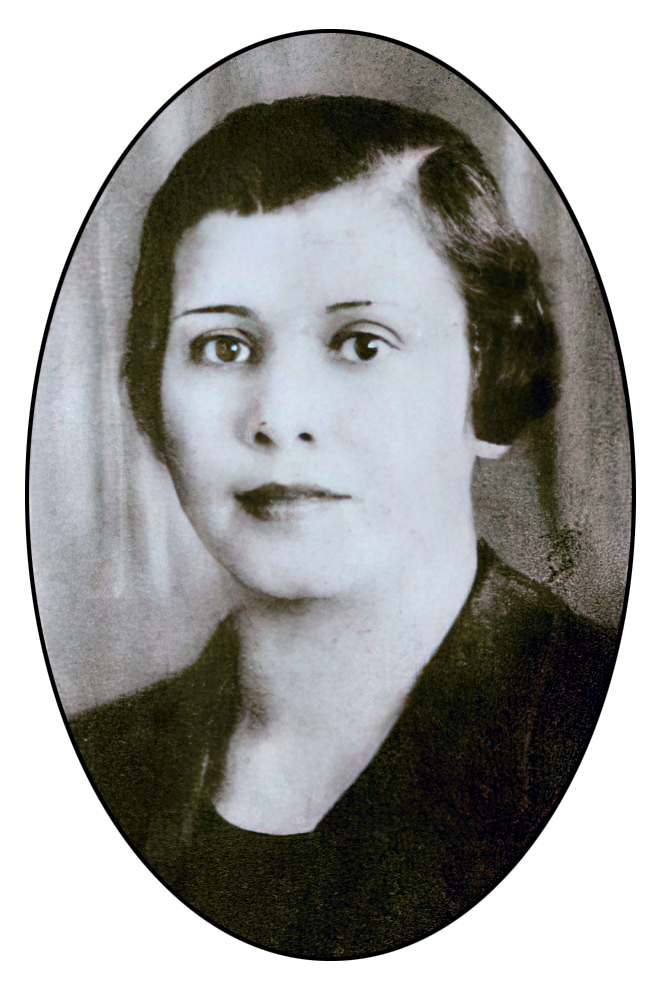
Emar Acosta

Emar Acosta (La Rioja, August 20, 1904 - San Juan, October 24, 1965) was an Argentine lawyer and politician who served as a judge and provincial legislator and was the first woman to be elected to a political role in Latin America. Her political involvement and views caused controversy, and she was arrested several times, despite her parliamentary immunity. Throughout her life, she fought for the rights of women and the poor, thus founding the Association of Civic Culture of San Juan Women.

== Early life and education ==
Acosta was born on 20 August 1904 in La Rioja, Argentina. She relocated to the capital to study law at the University of Buenos Aires. After graduating in 1926, Acosta moved to the province of San Juan, where she became a public defender in 1927, appointed by Aldo Cantoni, governor of San Juan, and became the first woman to hold the position.

Following a conflict with the Cantoni family, she resigned from her position. Then, she taught at Liceo Nacional de Señoritas and Colegio Nacional San Juan. Additionally, she organized the provincial bar association and association of civic political culture.

After a 1933 reform in San Juan that granted women the right to hold public office, she was elected deputy to the Chamber of Deputies of San Juan for the Democratic Party in 1934. In the first term, she successfully established the Board of Prisoners and Released Persons, the Board of Minors, and mobile medical clinics for rural areas. Additionally, she championed wage protections, workers' housing, and soup kitchens to combat the great depression. After completing her term in 1938, she was re-elected in 1941.

== Personal life ==
She has two sisters: Genoveva Acosta, who became the first female dentist in San Juan and La Rioja, and Leticia, who became the first female doctor in San Juan.
