= Ezequiel Martínez Estrada =

Argentine writer

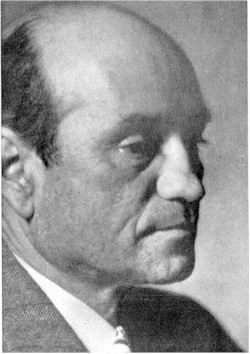
Ezequiel Martínez Estrada.

Ezequiel Martínez Estrada (September 14, 1895 – November 4, 1964) was an Argentine writer, poet, essayist, and literary critic. An admired biographer and critic, he was often political in his writings, and was a confirmed anti-Peronist. While in his middle years he was identified with the ideas of Nietzsche or Kafka, in his last years he was closely identified with the Cuban revolution and Fidel Castro.

== Life ==
Originally from rural Argentina, Martínez Estrada was born in San José de la Esquina, in Santa Fe Province and grew up until the age of twelve there and in Goyena, a village in the southern reaches of Buenos Aires province. (In 1937, he would buy a farm in Goyena). In 1907, his parents separated, and he went to live with his aunt Elisa in Buenos Aires, and to study at the Colegio Avellaneda. It appears that his formal studies were cut short due to poverty. By 1914 he was working at the central post office in Buenos Aires; he would remain in Buenos Aires until retiring in 1946.

Within a few years, he began to establish a reputation as a poet; he also published a few short essays. In 1921 he married the Italian-born artist Agustina Morriconi, who definitely subordinated her career and unquestioned talents to his; she was, by all accounts, the muse of much of his poetry.

Beginning in 1924, Martínez Estrada taught literature at the Colegio Nacional of the Universidad Nacional de La Plata. He would continue this for decades, losing the job only when Juan Domingo Perón rose to power in 1945 (and returning briefly after Perón fell from power in 1956).

In 1933, responding to the 1930 Argentinian coup by José Félix Uriburu, Martínez Estrada published Radiografía de la pampa, the first of a series of rather pessimistic sociological-psychological-historical essays that would make his reputation. That year, Martínez Estrada received the first of what were to be a series of national literary prizes. It is also about that time that he began travelling abroad; his generally favorable impressions during a U.S.-government-sponsored 1942 visit to the United States are recounted in his posthumously published Panorama de los Estados Unidos; his impressions on this visit apparently contrasted sharply with his earlier and later anti-Americanism.

In 1946 Martínez Estrada became a regular contributor to the Argentine magazine Sur, edited and published by Victoria Ocampo. His contributions to Sur included poems, essays, and Kafkaesque short stories.

During the Perón years, Martínez Estrada suffered from an extremely disabling form of neurodermatitis, quite possibly psychosomatic. After the fall of Perón, his health recovered, but still feeling himself a bit of a voice crying in the wilderness, he embarked on a series of writings he called his "catilinarias" (after Cicero's Catiline Orations), a series of acerbic writings directed at the Argentine elite, both in government and among the intellectuals, predicting that Argentina faced a century of "Pre-Peronism, Peronism, and Post-Peronism." During this time, he returned briefly to the Colegio Nacional, then was appointed as an Extraordinary Professor at the Universidad Nacional del Sur, in Bahía Blanca.

Beginning in mid-1959, Martínez Estrada began what became a semi-exile lasting nearly to the end of his life. First he went on a lecture tour of Chile, then to a peace conference in Vienna, where he met the Cuban poet Nicolás Guillén. In September 1959, he went on to Mexico, where he remained for a year at the Institute of Political Science at the Universidad Nacional Autónoma de México and wrote Diferencias y semejanzas entre los países de América Latina (Differences and resemblances among the Latin American countries), a long essay even broader than its title might suggest, in that it also drew parallels to Asia and Africa, and generally cast his lot with the emerging Third World-ist view, condemning imperialism and colonialism and expressing his admiration for the revolution then in progress in Cuba, which proved to be his next destination (although with some brief trips back to Argentina).

From September 1960 until November 1962, Martínez Estrada served as director of the Center for Latin American Studies of Cuba's Casa de las Américas. There, he became very much a part of the heady intellectual atmosphere of the first years of the revolution: above all, he studied the life and works of José Martí. He also edited two books of Fidel Castro's speeches, and numerous writings and pamphlets including El nuevo mundo, la isla de Utopía y la isla de Cuba (The New World, the Island of Utopia, and the Island of Cuba), in which he saw Cuba as having a manifest destiny, under which the indigenous Taínos of Cuba were linked to the "Amaurotos" of Thomas More's Utopia and Castro's Cuba to the ideal Cuba of Martí.

Martínez Estrada left Cuba shortly after the Cuban Missile Crisis. With his health beginning to fail, with Cuba expelled from the OAS, and with a need to attend to his own economic affairs, he decided that he "would better serve the revolution from abroad." After a brief stop in Mexico he returned to Argentina, to Bahía Blanca, and to his status as a voice in the wilderness. He completed his three books on Martí (none of which were published in his lifetime and one of which remains unpublished as of 2001), wrote a work on Balzac, and continued to write poems (notably his Tres poemas del anochecer -- Three Poems at Dusk—the last work he published in Sur). He spoke of returning to Cuba; it is not entirely clear whether his failure to do so was entirely a matter of his health or related to traces of disillusionment with the revolution that are evidenced in his correspondence. He died November 4, 1964, in Bahía Blanca.

== Works ==
The themes of Martínez Estrada's work can largely be gleaned from his choices of whom to write about. The names Nietzsche, Montaigne, and Kafka presumably speak for themselves, but there is also a specifically Latin American theme of skepticism about certain aspects of modernity to be found in his writings. In looking at the works of Domingo Sarmiento, he picked up Sarmiento's themes of "civilization" and "barbarism", but with a greater ambivalence about the virtues of civilization than were found in the earlier writer. Writing about 19th-century naturalist Guillermo Enrique Hudson, Martínez Estrada showed himself to be in sympathy with the idea of a return to a more paradisical natural world. He shared with his older contemporary Horacio Quiroga a concern for the mediocrity, injustice, and dehumanization of contemporary industrial / technological society. Like Sarmiento and José Martí, he believed that as a writer he could not only comment upon the world, but influence it. Towards the end of his life, this led to his support for the Cuban revolution and to his "catilinarias", acerbic writings on Argentine politics and culture.

Bibliography
Year	Work	Comments
1918	Oro y piedra (Gold and Stone)	Poetry
1922	Nefelibal	Poetry
1924	Motivos del cielo (The Motives of Heaven)	Poetry
1927	Argentina	Poetry
1929	Humoresca (Humoresque)	Poetry
1929	Títeres de pies ligeros (Light-footed marionettes)	A verse puppet play
1933	Radiografía de la pampa (An X-ray of the Pampa)	The first of a number of book-length sociological-psychological-historical essays
1940	La cabeza de Goliath (Goliath's Head)	Book-length essay
1944	La inundación (The Flood)	Short stories
1945	Autobiographical "letter" to Victoria Ocampo	Martínez Estrada's only autobiographical writing
1946	Sarmiento	Book-length essay
1946	Panorama de las literaturas (Panorama of Literature)	A reworking of his lectures on literature at the Colegio Nacional
1947	Poesía (Poetry)	Collected poetry
1947	Los invariantes históricos en el Facundo (Historic Invariants in Facundo)	Book-length essay on Sarmiento's Facundo: Civilization and Barbarism
1947	Nietzsche	Biography / literary criticism
1948	Muerte y transfiguración de Martín Fierro (Death and Transfiguration of Martín Fierro)	Two-volume essay on the poem Martín Fierro by José Hernández
1951	El mundo maravilloso de Guillermo Enrique Hudson (The marvelous world of Guillermo Enrique Hudson)	Biography / literary criticism
1956	Cuadrante del pampero (Portrait of the Pampas-dweller)	"Catilinarias"
1956	¿Qué es esto? (What is this?)	"Catilinarias"
1956	Examen sin conciencia	Short stories
1956	Sábado de gloria (The Glorious Saturday)	Short stories
1956	Tres cuentos sin amor (Three Stories Without Love)	Short stories
1956	La tos y otros entretenimientos ("The Cough" and other Amusements)	Short stories
1957	Tres dramas: Lo que no vemos morir. Sombras. Cazadores (Three plays: What We Don't See Die, Shadows, The Hunters)	Plays
1957	El hermano Quiroga (Brother Quiroga)	Biography / literary criticism
1957	Exhortaciones (Exhortations)	"Catilinarias"
1957	Las 40 (The 40)	"Catilinarias"
1958	Heraldos de la verdad (Heralds of Truth)	Biography / literary criticism: studies of Montaigne, Nietzsche, and Balzac
1959	Coplas de ciego (Blind Man's Rhymes)	Poetry
1959	Otras Coplas de ciego (More Blind Man's Rhymes)	Poetry
1960	Análisis funcional de la cultura (A Functional Analysis of Culture)	Essays
1962	Diferencias y semejanzas entre los países de América Latina (Differences and resemblances among the Latin American countries)	Essay
1963	En Cuba y al servicio de la Revolución Cubana (In Cuba, and At the Service of the Cuban Revolution)	Political writing.
1963	El verdadero cuento del tío Sam (The True Story of Uncle Sam)	Political writing in Spanish, English, and French, illustrated by Siné.
1963	El nuevo mundo, la isla de Utopía y la isla de Cuba (The New World, the Island of Utopia, and the Island of Cuba)	Political writing
1964	Realidad y fantasía en Balzac (Reality and fantasy in Balzac)	Literary Criticism
1964	Tres poemas del anochecer (Three Poems at Dusk)	Poetry
Posthumous publications
1966	La poesía afrocubana de Nicolás Guillén (The Afro-Cuban poetry of Nicolás Guillén)	Literary criticism.
1966	Martí: el héroe y su acción revolucionaria (Martí: The Hero and his Revolutionary Action)	Biography / literary criticism.
1966	Poesía de Ezequiel Martínez Estrada (The Poetry of Ezequiel Martínez Estrada)	Collected poetry
1967	Martí revolucionario (Martí as Revolutionary)	Biography / literary criticism.
1967	En torno a Kafka y otros ensayos ("On Kafka" and other essays)	Essays, literary criticism.
1967	Para una revisión de las letras argentinas (For a Revision of Argentine Letters)	Essays, literary criticism.
1968	Cuatro Novelas (Four Novels)	
1968	Leopoldo Lugones: retrato sin retocar (Leopoldo Lugones: an Unretouched Portrait)	Biography / literary criticism
1968	Meditaciones sarmientinas (Meditations After Sarmiento)	Biography / literary criticism
1969	Leer y escribir (Reading and Writing)	Essays, literary criticism.
1975	Cuentos completos (Complete Stories)	Stories, edited by Roberto Yahni
1985	Panorama de los Estados Unidos (Panorama of the United States)	Travelogue, believed written shortly after his 1942 visit to the U.S
(unpublished)	La doctrina, el apóstol (The doctrine, the Apostle)	An unpublished third book on José Martí.

== Honors ==
- 1933-(Argentine) National Prize for Literature (for his poems)
- 1933 - 1934—President of the Argentine Society of Writers (SADE)
- 1937-(Argentine) National Prize for Letters for Radiografía de la pampa
- 1942 - 1946—President of SADE, again
- 1948—SADE's highest honor, the "Gran Premio de Honor"
- 1949—SADE puts forward his name as a candidate for a Nobel Prize, but he does not receive it.
- 1957—President of the Argentine League for Human Rights ("Liga Argentina por los Derechos del Hombre")
