= Fernando Demaría =

Argentine poet, philosopher and classical scholar

Fernando Demaría (born in Buenos Aires, July 19, 1928) is an Argentine poet, philosopher and classical scholar.

Demaría studied at Buenos Aires’ Colegio Champagnat, run by the priests of the Marian Order, whose dedication and rectitude represent a cornerstone in the poet’s life. He then graduated in Philosophy at the University of Buenos Aires under the guidance of such humanists as Guillermo Thiele y Carlos Astrada, who made a decisive contribution towards defining his intellectual vocation.

Demaría's urban and academic formation, however, finds an indispensable complement in his deep-rooted contact with the land and the rural environment. He believes that a writer of our time should write few and brief works in order to grant the reader the time to familiarize with the many other authors of value.

Demaría was among the personal friends of Argentine writer and poet Leopoldo Marechal, who dedicated him the Alegropeya of his Heptamerón series.

Under the guidance of Guillermo Thiele, Demaría published a translation of Heraclitus' Fragments in 1957 for the Universidad Nacional del Litoral. This work was republished in 1972 with the illustrations of Uruguayan artist Lincoln Presno, whose 40 meter memorial monument to John F. Kennedy in the vast pampa region near Quemú Quemú, a town founded by the poet's grandparents, was built upon the poet's request.

Demaría's study of philosophy led him to the conviction that man's deepest conscience responds to sentiment and feeling rather than to ideas and rationality. His reflections on this aspect of human experience and his own personal quest for clarification resulted in his Treatise on Sentiment or Tratado del Sentimiento, published in 1970 by the Ediciones del Hombre Nuevo, founded among others by his friend Rafael Squirru.

Among Demaría’s other works: Máximas para la Vida or Maxims for Life, a work in constant re-elaboration.

Regarding his poetry, it has been condensed under the common title of Pampa Roja, elaborated in three stages of his life. The first edition was the result of the visits to La Pampa together with his friend, the painter Perez Celis. Editorial Dunken published the third and final part in 2007 under the name Tierra de Elegía, or Land of Elegy, a collection of love sonnets. The first two editions of Pampa Roja’s first part were illustrated by Argentine artist and personal friend Pérez Celis. At the end of his life, in absence of readers, he compiled his last poems under the title "Pampa de Estrellas" dedicated to "The Invisibles".
