= Aesthetic atrophy =

Aesthetic atrophy is the diminished capacity to appreciate new or unfamiliar music or other sensory stimuli. It is typically accompanied by the sufferer's retreat to familiar and comfortable works.
