= Art criticism =

Discussion or evaluation of visual art

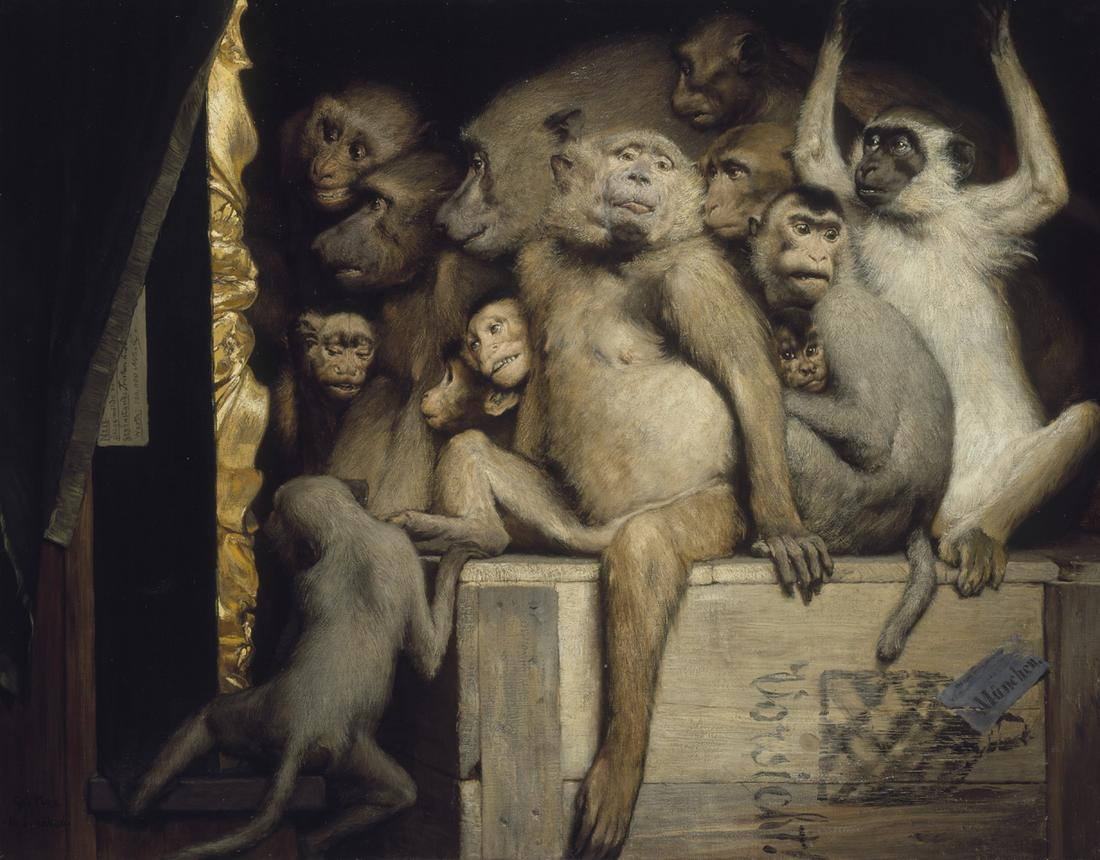
Monkeys as Judges of Art, 1889, Gabriel von Max

Art criticism is the discussion or evaluation of visual art. Art critics usually criticize art in the context of aesthetics or the theory of beauty. A goal of art criticism is the pursuit of a rational basis for art appreciation but it is questionable whether such criticism can transcend prevailing socio-political circumstances.

The variety of artistic movements has resulted in a division of art criticism into different disciplines which may each use different criteria for their judgements. The most common division in the field of criticism is between historical criticism and evaluation, a form of art history, and contemporary criticism of work by living artists.

Despite perceptions that art criticism is a much lower risk activity than making art, opinions of current art are always liable to drastic corrections with the passage of time. Critics of the past are often ridiculed for dismissing artists now venerated (like the early work of the Impressionists). Some art movements themselves were named disparagingly by critics, with the name later adopted as a sort of badge of honour by the artists of the style (e.g., Impressionism, Cubism), with the original negative meaning forgotten.

Artists have often had an uneasy relationship with their critics. Artists usually need positive opinions from critics for their work to be viewed and purchased; unfortunately for the artists, only later generations may understand it.

There are many different variables that determine judgment of art such as aesthetics, cognition or perception. Art is a human instinct with a diverse range of form and expression. Art can stand alone with an instantaneous judgment, or be viewed with a deeper knowledge. Aesthetic, pragmatic, expressive, formalist, relativist, processional, imitation, ritual, cognition, mimetic and postmodern theories, are some of many theories to criticize and appreciate art. Art criticism and appreciation can be subjective based on personal preference toward aesthetics and form, or it can be based on the elements and principle of design and by social and cultural acceptance.

== Definition ==
Art criticism has many and often numerous subjective viewpoints which are nearly as varied as there are people practising it. It is difficult to come by a more stable definition than the activity being related to the discussion and interpretation of art and its value. Depending on who is writing on the subject, "art criticism" itself may be obviated as a direct goal or it may include art history within its framework. Regardless of definitional problems, art criticism can refer to the history of the craft in its essays and art history itself may use critical methods implicitly. According to art historian R. Siva Kumar, "The borders between art history and art criticism... are no more as firmly drawn as they once used to be. It perhaps began with art historians taking interest in modern art."

== Methodology ==
Art criticism includes a descriptive aspect, where the work of art is sufficiently translated into words so as to allow a case to be made. The evaluation of a work of art that follows the description (or is interspersed with it) depends as much on the artist's output as on the experience of the critic. There is in an activity with such a marked subjective component a variety of ways in which it can be pursued. As extremes in a possible spectrum, while some favour simply remarking on the immediate impressions caused by an artistic object, others prefer a more systematic approach calling on technical knowledge, favoured aesthetic theory and the known sociocultural context the artist is immersed in to discern their intent.

== History ==
Critiques of art likely originated with the origins of art itself, as evidenced by texts found in the works of Plato, Vitruvius or Augustine of Hippo among others, that contain early forms of art criticism. Also, wealthy patrons have employed, at least since the start of Renaissance, intermediary art-evaluators to assist them in the procurement of commissions and/or finished pieces.

=== Origins ===
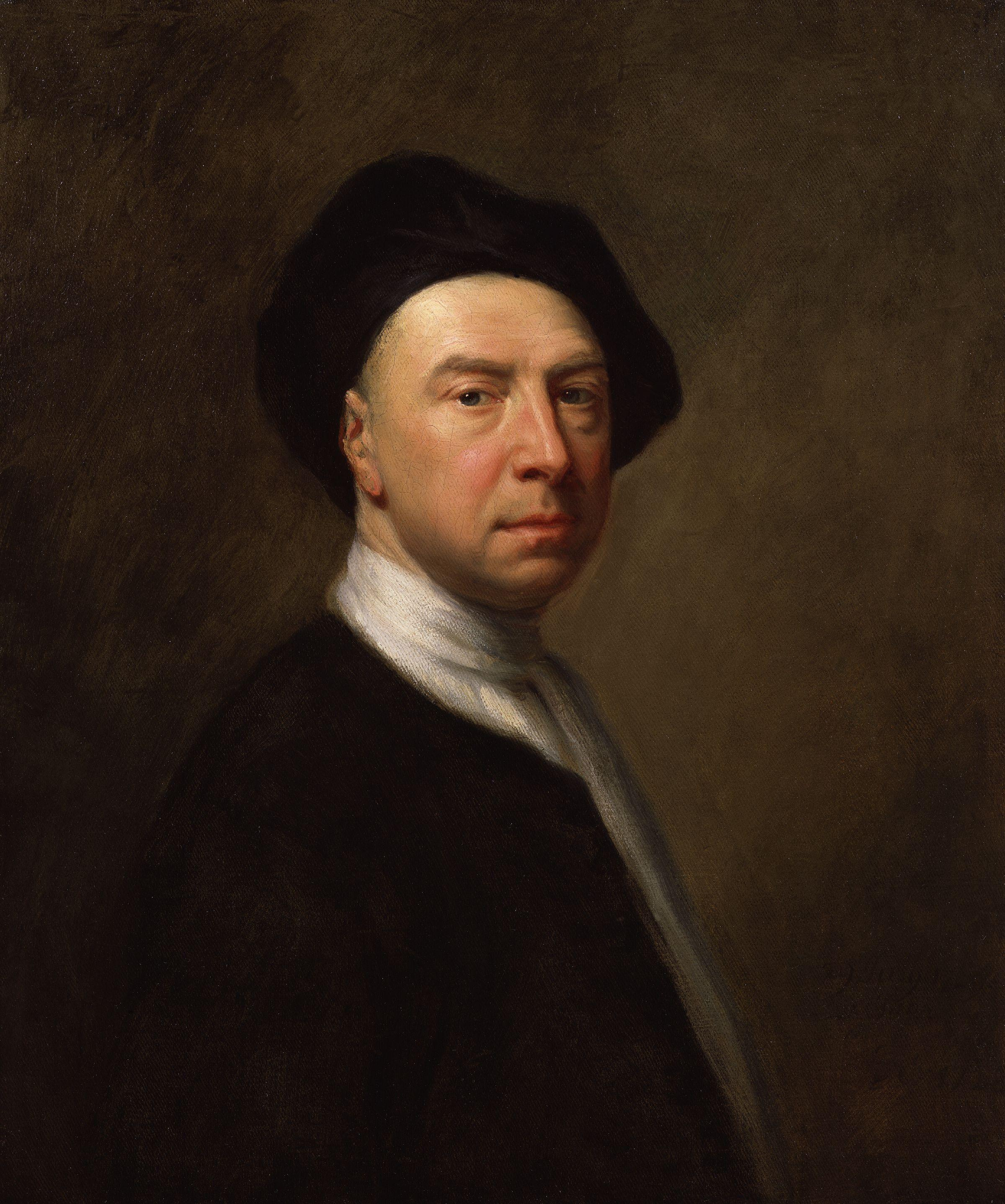
Jonathan Richardson coined the term 'art criticism' in 1719.

Art criticism as a genre of writing, obtained its modern form in the 18th century. The earliest use of the term art criticism was by the English painter Jonathan Richardson in his 1719 publication An Essay on the Whole Art of Criticism. In this work, he attempted to create an objective system for the ranking of works of art. Seven categories, including drawing, composition, invention and colouring, were given a score from 0 to 18, which were combined to give a final score. The term he introduced quickly caught on, especially as the English middle class began to be more discerning in their art acquisitions, as symbols of their flaunted social status.

In France and England in the mid-1700s, public interest in art began to become widespread, and art was regularly exhibited at the Salons in Paris and the Summer Exhibitions of London. The first writers to acquire an individual reputation as art critics in 18th-century France were Jean-Baptiste Dubos with his Réflexions critiques sur la poésie et sur la peinture (1718) which garnered the acclaim of Voltaire for the sagacity of his approach to aesthetic theory; and Étienne La Font de Saint-Yenne with Reflexions sur quelques causes de l'état présent de la peinture en France who wrote about the Salon of 1746, commenting on the socioeconomic framework of the production of the then popular Baroque art style, which led to a perception of anti-monarchist sentiments in the text.

The 18th-century French writer Denis Diderot greatly advanced the medium of art criticism. Diderot's "The Salon of 1765" was one of the first real attempts to capture art in words. According to art historian Thomas E. Crow, "When Diderot took up art criticism it was on the heels of the first generation of professional writers who made it their business to offer descriptions and judgments of contemporary painting and sculpture. The demand for such commentary was a product of the similarly novel institution of regular, free, public exhibitions of the latest art".

Meanwhile, in England an exhibition of the Society of Arts in 1762 and later, in 1766, prompted a flurry of critical, though anonymous, pamphlets. Newspapers and periodicals of the period, such as the London Chronicle, began to carry columns for art criticism; a form that took off with the foundation of the Royal Academy in 1768. In the 1770s, the Morning Chronicle became the first newspaper to systematically review the art featured at exhibitions.

=== 19th century ===
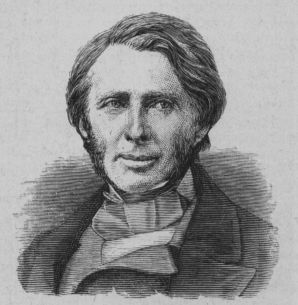
John Ruskin, the preeminent art critic of 19th century England

From the 19th century onwards, art criticism became a more common vocation and even a profession, developing at times formalised methods based on particular aesthetic theories. In France, a rift emerged in the 1820s between the proponents of traditional neo-classical forms of art and the new romantic fashion. The Neoclassicists, under Étienne-Jean Delécluze defended the classical ideal and preferred carefully finished form in paintings. Romantics, such as Stendhal, criticized the old styles as overly formulaic and devoid of any feeling. Instead, they championed the new expressive, Idealistic, and emotional nuances of Romantic art. A similar, though more muted, debate also occurred in England.

One of the prominent critics in England at the time was William Hazlitt, a painter and essayist. He wrote about his deep pleasure in art and his belief that the arts could be used to improve mankind's generosity of spirit and knowledge of the world around it. He was one of a rising tide of English critics that began to grow uneasy with the increasingly abstract direction J. M. W. Turner's landscape art was moving in.

One of the great critics of the 19th century was John Ruskin. In 1843 he published Modern Painters, which repeated concepts from "Landscape and Portrait-Painting" in The Yankee (1829) by first American art critic John Neal in its distinction between "things seen by the artist" and "things as they are." Through painstaking analysis and attention to detail, Ruskin achieved what art historian E. H. Gombrich called "the most ambitious work of scientific art criticism ever attempted." Ruskin became renowned for his rich and flowing prose, and later in life he branched out to become an active and wide-ranging critic, publishing works on architecture and Renaissance art, including the Stones of Venice.

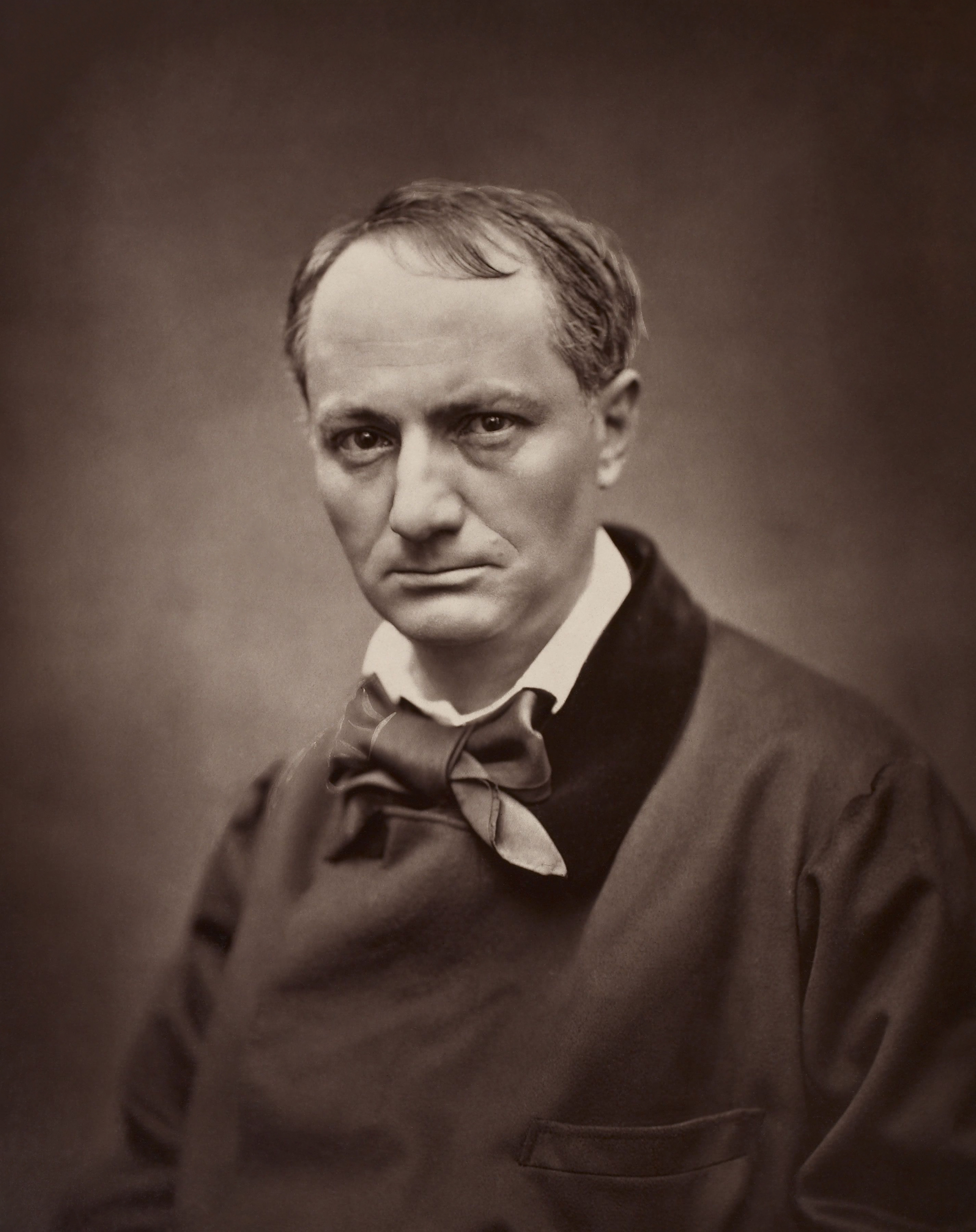
Charles Baudelaire's Salon of 1845 art review shocked its audience with its ideas.

Another dominating figure in 19th-century art criticism, was the French poet Charles Baudelaire, whose first published work was his art review Salon of 1845, which attracted immediate attention for its boldness. Many of his critical opinions were novel in their time, including his championing of Eugène Delacroix. When Édouard Manet's famous Olympia (1865), a portrait of a nude courtesan, provoked a scandal for its blatant realism, Baudelaire worked privately to support his friend. He claimed that "criticism should be partial, impassioned, political— that is to say, formed from an exclusive point of view, but also from a point of view that opens up the greatest number of horizons". He tried to move the debate from the old binary positions of previous decades, declaring that "the true painter, will be he who can wring from contemporary life its epic aspect and make us see and understand, with colour or in drawing, how great and poetic we are in our cravats and our polished boots".

In 1877, John Ruskin derided Nocturne in Black and Gold – The Falling Rocket after the artist, James McNeill Whistler, showed it at Grosvenor Gallery: "I have seen, and heard, much of Cockney impudence before now; but never expected to hear a coxcomb ask two hundred guineas for flinging a pot of paint in the public's face." This criticism provoked Whistler into suing the critic for libel. The ensuing court case proved to be a Pyrrhic victory for Whistler.

=== Turn of the twentieth century ===
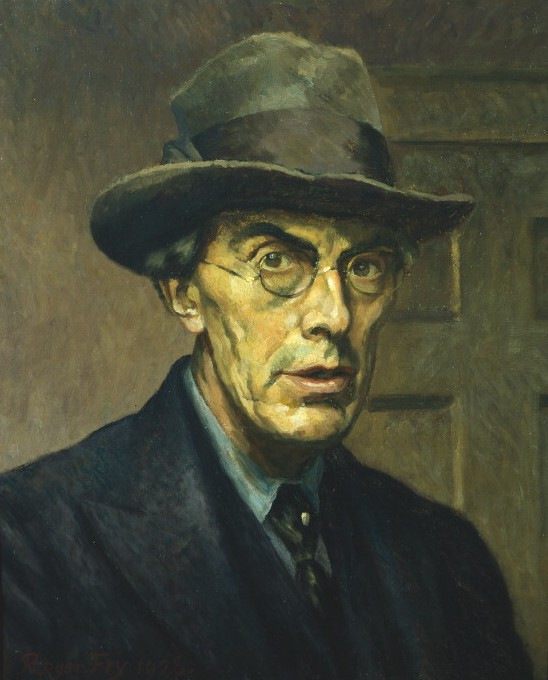
Self portrait of Roger Fry, described by the art historian Kenneth Clark as "incomparably the greatest influence on taste since Ruskin... In so far as taste can be changed by one man, it was changed by Roger Fry".

Towards the end of the 19th century a movement towards abstraction, as opposed to specific content, began to gain ground in England, notably championed by the playwright Oscar Wilde. By the early twentieth century these attitudes formally coalesced into a coherent philosophy, through the work of Bloomsbury Group members Roger Fry and Clive Bell. As an art historian in the 1890s, Fry became intrigued with the new modernist art and its shift away from traditional depiction. His 1910 exhibition of what he called post-Impressionist art attracted much criticism for its iconoclasm. He vigorously defended himself in a lecture, in which he argued that art had moved to attempt to discover the language of pure imagination, rather than the staid and, to his mind, dishonest scientific capturing of landscape. Fry's argument proved to be very influential at the time, especially among the progressive elite. Virginia Woolf remarked that: "in or about December 1910 [the date Fry gave his lecture] human character changed."

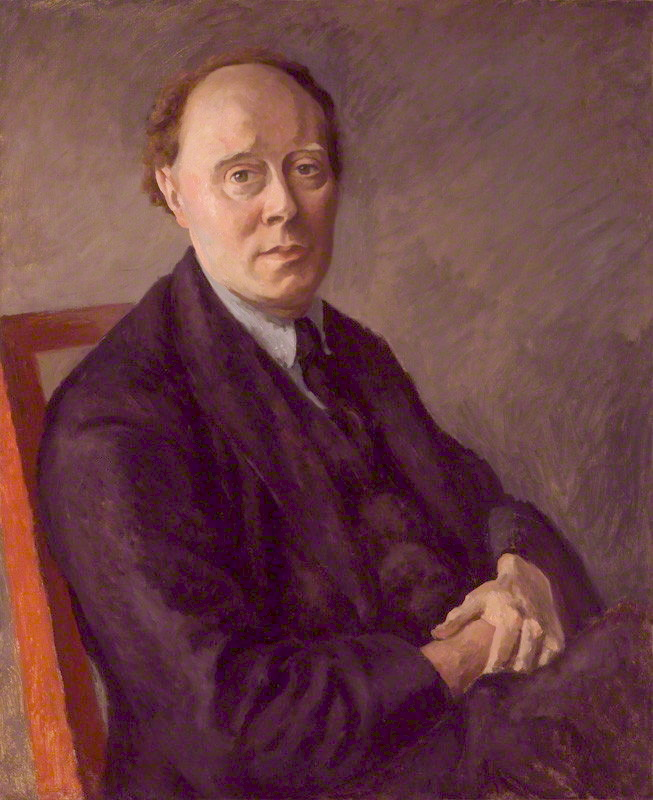
Clive Bell by Roger Fry, 1924, oil on canvas. National Portrait Gallery, London. NPG 4967.

Independently, and at the same time, Clive Bell argued in his 1914 book Art that all art work has its particular 'significant form', while the conventional subject matter was essentially irrelevant. This work laid the foundations for the formalist approach to art. In 1920, Fry argued that "it's all the same to me if I represent a Christ or a saucepan since it's the form, and not the object itself, that interests me." As well as being a proponent of formalism, he argued that the value of art lies in its ability to produce a distinctive aesthetic experience in the viewer. an experience he called "aesthetic emotion". He defined it as that experience which is aroused by significant form. He also suggested that the reason we experience aesthetic emotion in response to the significant form of a work of art was that we perceive that form as an expression of an experience the artist has. The artist's experience in turn, he suggested, was the experience of seeing ordinary objects in the world as pure form: the experience one has when one sees something not as a means to something else, but as an end in itself.

Herbert Read was a champion of modern British artists such as Paul Nash, Ben Nicholson, Henry Moore and Barbara Hepworth and became associated with Nash's contemporary arts group Unit One. He focused on the modernism of Pablo Picasso and Georges Braque, and published an influential 1929 essay on the meaning of art in The Listener. He also edited the trend-setting Burlington Magazine (1933–38) and helped organise the London International Surrealist Exhibition in 1936.

=== Since 1945 ===
As in the case of Baudelaire in the 19th century, the poet-as-critic phenomenon appeared once again in the 20th, when French poet Apollinaire became the champion of Cubism. Later, French writer and hero of the Resistance André Malraux wrote extensively on art, going well beyond the limits of his native Europe. His conviction that the vanguard in Latin America lay in Mexican Muralism (Orozco, Rivera and Siqueiros) changed after his trip to Buenos Aires in 1958. After visiting the studios of several Argentine artists in the company of the young Director of the Buenos Aires Museum of Modern Art, Rafael Squirru, Malraux declared the new vanguard to lie in Argentina's new artistic movements. Squirru, a poet-critic who became Cultural Director of the OAS in Washington, D.C., during the 1960s, was the last to interview Edward Hopper before his death, contributing to a revival of interest in the American artist.

In the 1940s there were not only few galleries (The Art of This Century) but also few critics who were willing to follow the work of the New York Vanguard. There were also a few artists with a literary background, among them Robert Motherwell and Barnett Newman who functioned as critics as well.

Although New York and the world were unfamiliar with the New York avant-garde, by the late 1940s most of the artists who have become household names today had their well established patron critics. Clement Greenberg advocated Abstract Expressionist and color field painters like Jackson Pollock, Clyfford Still, Mark Rothko, Barnett Newman, Adolph Gottlieb and Hans Hofmann. Harold Rosenberg seemed to prefer the action painters such as Willem de Kooning and Franz Kline. Thomas B. Hess, the managing editor of ARTnews, championed Willem de Kooning.

The new critics elevated their protégés by casting other artists as "followers" or ignoring those who did not serve their promotional goal. As an example, in 1958, Mark Tobey "became the first American painter since Whistler (1895) to win top prize at the Biennale of Venice. New York's two leading art magazines were not interested. Arts mentioned the historic event only in a news column and Art News (Managing editor: Thomas B. Hess) ignored it completely. The New York Times and Life printed feature articles".

Barnett Newman, a late member of the Uptown Group wrote catalogue forewords and reviews and by the late 1940s became an exhibiting artist at Betty Parsons Gallery. His first solo show was in 1948. Soon after his first exhibition, Barnett Newman remarked in one of the Artists' Session at Studio 35: "We are in the process of making the world, to a certain extent, in our own image". Utilizing his writing skills, Newman fought every step of the way to reinforce his newly established image as an artist and to promote his work. An example is his letter to Sidney Janis on 9 April 1955:

It is true that Rothko talks the fighter. He fights, however, to submit to the philistine world. My struggle against bourgeois society has involved the total rejection of it.

The person thought to have had most to do with the promotion of this style was a New York Trotskyist, Clement Greenberg. As long time art critic for the Partisan Review and The Nation, he became an early and literate proponent of Abstract Expressionism. Artist Robert Motherwell, well-heeled, joined Greenberg in promoting a style that fit the political climate and the intellectual rebelliousness of the era.

Clement Greenberg proclaimed Abstract Expressionism and Jackson Pollock in particular as the epitome of aesthetic value. Greenberg supported Pollock's work on formalistic grounds as simply the best painting of its day and the culmination of an art tradition going back via Cubism and Cézanne to Monet, in which painting became ever "purer" and more concentrated in what was "essential" to it, the making of marks on a flat surface.

Jackson Pollock's work has always polarised critics. Harold Rosenberg spoke of the transformation of painting into an existential drama in Pollock's work, in which "what was to go on the canvas was not a picture but an event". "The big moment came when it was decided to paint 'just to paint'. The gesture on the canvas was a gesture of liberation from value—political, aesthetic, moral."

One of the most vocal critics of Abstract Expressionism at the time was New York Times art critic John Canaday. Meyer Schapiro and Leo Steinberg were also important postwar art historians who voiced support for Abstract Expressionism. During the early to mid sixties younger art critics Michael Fried, Rosalind Krauss and Robert Hughes added considerable insights into the critical dialectic that continues to grow around Abstract Expressionism.

=== Feminist art criticism ===
Feminist art criticism emerged in the 1970s from the wider feminist movement as the critical examination of both visual representations of women in art and art produced by women.

== Today ==
Art critics today work not only in print media and in specialist art magazines as well as newspapers. Art critics appear also on the internet, TV, and radio, as well as in museums and galleries. Many are also employed in universities or as art educators for museums. Art critics curate exhibitions and are frequently employed to write exhibition catalogues. Art critics have their own organisation, the International Association of Art Critics, which is affiliated with UNESCO and has around 76 national sections and a politically non-aligned section for refugees and exiles.

=== Art blogs ===
Since the early 21st century, online art critical websites and art blogs have cropped up around the world to add their voices to the art world. Many of these writers use social media resources like Facebook, Twitter, Tumblr and Google+ to introduce readers to their opinions about art criticism.

== See also ==
- Art history
- Art critic
- Documenta 12 magazines (contemporary examples of art criticism)
