= Helmets for Peace =

Helmets for Peace is a work of art by Batuz, consisting of military helmets and attached to them shields made of dyed paper pulp, straw and various other materials. The work of art aims to raise awareness among people about the important role of the peacekeeping missions of the United Nations.

General Hans-Peter von Kirchbach (former General Inspector of the Bundeswehr) inspired Batuz to create a permanent installation from the helmets and the attached to them shields, which should turn into a symbol of peace to be followed by many armies around the world. In the summer of 2007 Batuz finished assembling the first installation of the work which was called "Helmets for Peace". It was exhibited in an abandoned hall in Chemnitz. The work included 167 helmets and was 5,50 meter high and 11,30 meter wide.

The shields, which were used as vital parts of the artwork "Helmets for Peace", have been painted five years earlier by dozens of international artists in another project – the "border crossing" at the Neisse River at the border between Germany and Poland in 2002, in which the Bundeswehr played a significant role.

In 2012 "Helmets for Peace" was vandalized and a few weeks later disassembled and stored away.

With the support of General Hans-Peter von Kirchbach and Minister Christian Schmidt (at that time Parliamentary State Secretary in the German Federal Ministry of Defence) "Helmets for Peace" found a new home in the Militärhistorisches Museum der Bundeswehr. The exhibition opening took place on March 2, 2015.

Prof. Dr. Dieter Ronte acknowledges the importance of "Helmets for Peace", drawing similarities to Picasso's artwork Guernica.
