= Batuz =

German artist

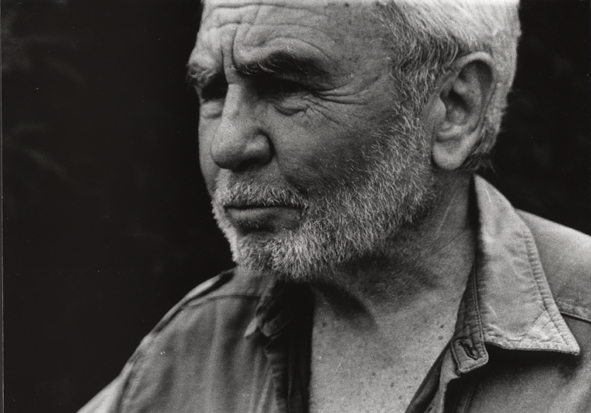
A portrait of Batuz

Batuz (born May 27, 1933) is an artist, philosopher and cultural activist. He is the founder of the Société Imaginaire, an undertaking that strives for cultural dialogue. Batuz' ideas are carried out through the support of his foundations – Batuz Foundation USA and Batuz Foundation Uruguay, as well as Helmets for Peace e.V.

== Philosophy ==
As an artist Batuz developed over the last decades with great consistency works in which a line becomes a mental barrier and acquires a vital function within the picture. Batuz works with many different media, what remains the same is his vision of a co-existing world that acts as a possible community in which everyone can communicate with everyone else; the intellectuals amongst themselves but also with all others. High and low has no meaning. What's important is to create a peaceful world. The works of art are agents in this world.

Batuz works out of an abstract, conceptually philosophical world that he consistently wants to convey into practical results. Not to remain as an image but to give the visual world a new reality. He wants to overcome boundaries, to visually annul the differences between people.

== Life and work ==
=== Early life (1933-1963) ===
Batuz spent his childhood at the country estate of Matraderecske, Hungary that belonged to the family for generations. Batuz’ life changed abruptly when the front lines of World War II approached the area. The family looked for temporary refuge from the horrors of the war and moved to Austria, never to return. The family in their escape underwent wandering, starvation, and refugee camps. The contact with people under these circumstances gave him another dimension of life. He worked hard to help to maintain the family. In 1949 the family emigrated to Argentina. During a heart ailment that incapacitated him for a year, Batuz started to paint in a naturalistic style.

Batuz was completely self-taught in art; an entirely autodidact. He also pursued studies in esthetics and philosophy. He was perpetually moved between the balance of the artistic world and that of the social. Such writers as Ortega y Gasset would greatly influence his work. He shared wide humanistic interests with groups of friends. His painting moved from a figurative style and became more personal.

=== Villa Gesell, Argentina (1964-1972) ===
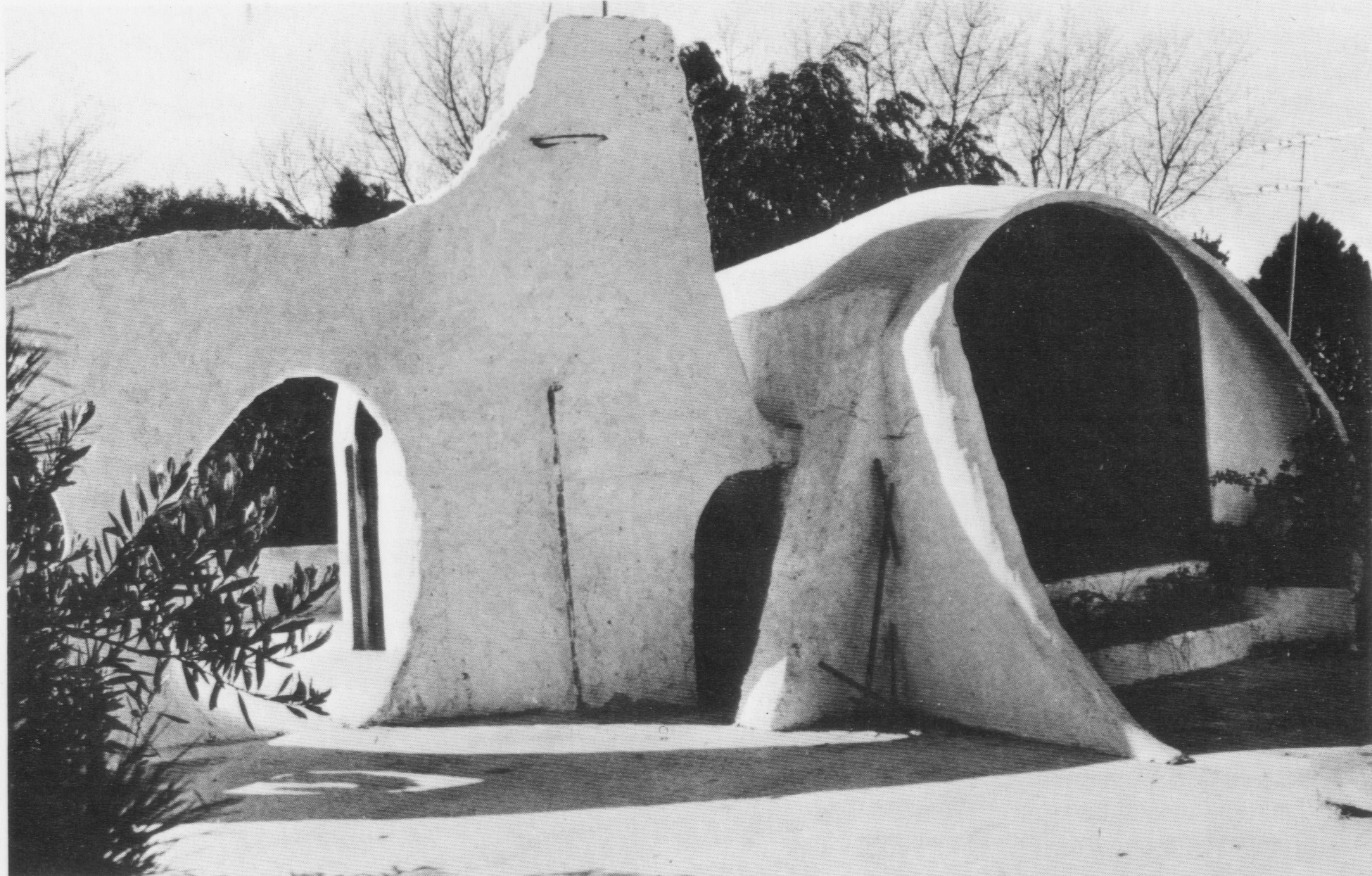
The atelier of Batuz in Villa Gesell

Batuz abandoned business in 1964 and dedicated himself exclusively to painting. Batuz moved to Villa Gesell, a solitary place by the sea, where he spent eight years in complete dedication to his work. The bright and hard sunshine on this vast extension of sea and sand dunes together with the spaces created by dark bushes, as a consequence to a preconceived notion, influenced his forms and colors. He turned more and more towards abstraction. This realization became the leitmotif for his entire lifework; the ‘Interrelation of Forms’.

In 1969 Batuz built his atelier, approaching it like an organic sculpture without previous plans. He completed the entire construction himself. Met Leopoldo Presas, the beginning of a lifelong friendship and a year later Batuz met Rafael Squirru with whom began a great collaboration.

Through the generous donation by Carlos Idaho Gesell, in 1971 Batuz founded the Artist Center in Villa Gesell to bring together painters, writers, sculptors and musicians. Already burgeoning in his mind was the idea to bring together like-minded people, a concept he would only years later realize with his Société Imaginaire.

In 1972 Batuz published his first portfolio of serigraphs with text by Rafael Squirru. The flat-even surface of silkscreen printing was a revelation to Batuz. Simplification of his work followed. John Davis Lodge, at this time the American Ambassador to Argentina, became interested in Batuz’ work. It was the beginning of a valued friendship. With the sponsorship of the Argentine Government initiated by the Ministry of Culture, Batuz left for an exhibition tour to the United States.

=== USA (1973-1983) ===
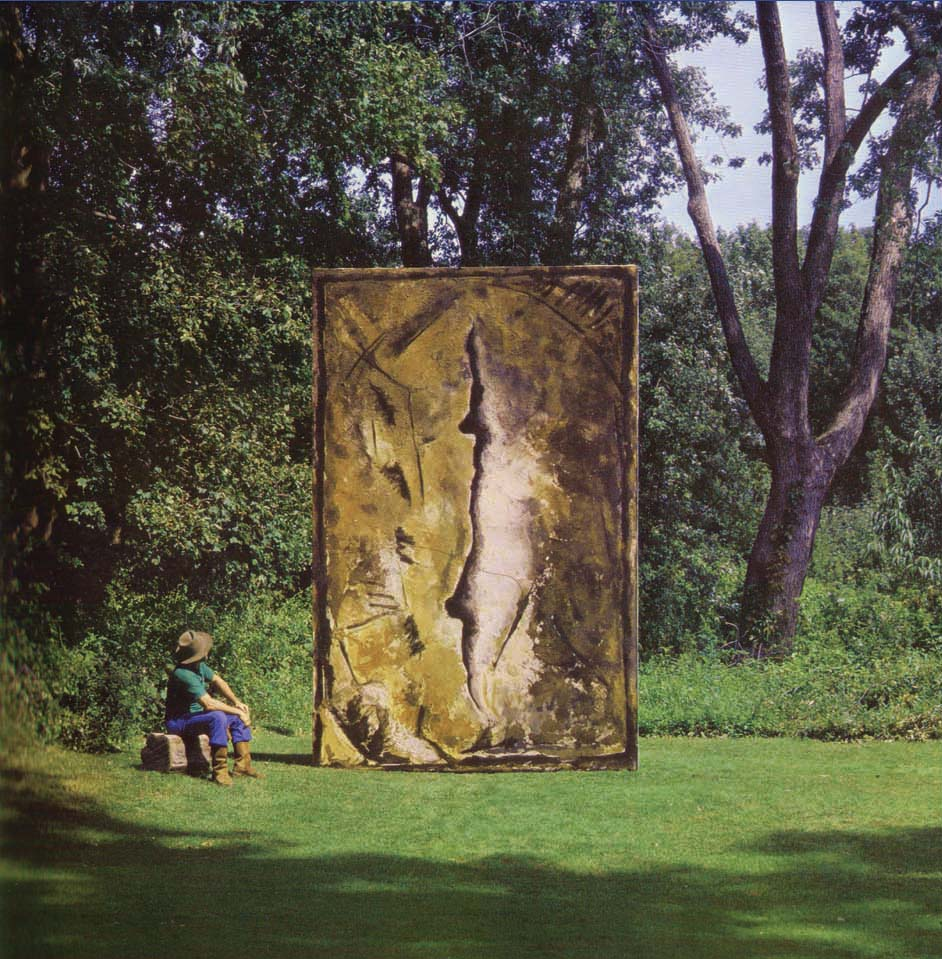
One of the works of Batuz

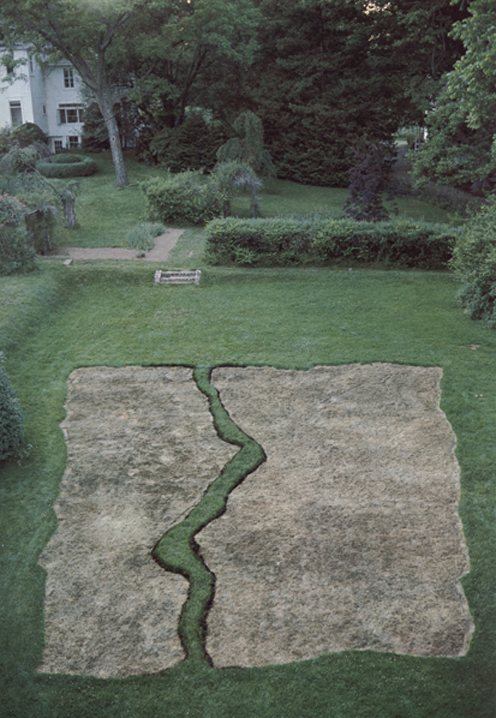
A painting made on grass. First covering the grass for a long time with an opaque material and then burning the dried grass with gunpowder.

One-man show at the Organization of American States in Washington DC. Several galleries in New York City begin to handle his work.

Batuz was invited to lecture at The Arts Students League of New York City by Vaclav Vytlacil. Several one-man shows in museums and universities in the United States followed. Batuz turns more and more toward the source and origin of forms.

In 1975 Batuz published his portfolio ‘Forms in Tension’. The portfolio is yet another decisive step towards his study on the ‘Interrelation of Forms’.

Joseph and Olga Hirshhorn visit his studio on several occasions. Their interest in Batuz’ work along with their personal friendship was of great encouragement.

Batuz travels through several South American countries for three months. In Argentina he had two memorable dialogues with Jorge Luis Borges where they considered the function of ‘Form’ in painting and literature.

In 1976 Batuz accepted an invitation to exhibit in West Germany. The occasion provided the opportunity to visit friends, some not seen for 30 years. Visited Oskar Kokoshka at his home in Villeneuve. First meeting with Dieter Ronte, lifelong friend and collaborator.

Published his portfolio ‘Hommage to America’. Another step towards his becoming a cultural activist, Batuz founded the International Cultural Program to aid Latin-American artists arriving in the United States. H.H. Arnason visits Batuz at his Beachside studio in Greens Farms and writes text to the portfolio ‘Grey Botonds’.

Purchased Franton Court, former estate of Baroness Hilla von Rebay where artists like Wassily Kandinsky and Marc Chagall visited. The place breathed creativity and the open natural setting cultivated with many gardens was ideal. Batuz introduces other mediums into his work, making collages using pasted paper and canvas on wood. Published portfolio ‘Polyphormic’. Several large scale paintings followed. His works were shown at the new acquisition shows at the Hirshhorn Museum and Sculpture Garden, Washington DC and at the Kunsthalle, Nuremberg, West Germany.

Batuz had one-man shows at the Museu de Arte de São Paulo in Brazil and the Phillips Collection in Washington DC. His book ‘Interrelation of Forms’, with texts by Rafael Squirru, Frank Getlein, Dieter Ronte, and Joseph H. Hirshhorn, also serves as catalogue for these shows. Experiments in the handmade paper workshop of John Koller, where he did a series of works by hydraulic press. Begins to work with pulp in his own studio in a free manner. Completes his large work, ‘Omen’, in September. Travels to Europe, where he is invited to exhibit by several museums.

In 1980 Batuz creates several large works in paper. Film by Rawn Fulton on his life and work starts in April and continues during the following eight months, becoming an important document on the process of his work at all stages. Makes his landscape work in grass on the abandoned tennis court of his home. Works on maquettes for ceramic, stone, wood, and metal sculptures as further development of his search for form relationships.

Together with Dieter Ronte visits Inge Morath and Arthur Miller in Roxbury. Through the next twenty years of friendship, until her death, Morath created the ‘Portrait Gallery’, documenting the Société Imaginaire.

From January to April 1982 works in isolation on huge paintings in Blanton (Dade City), Florida.

In 1983 Michel Butor visits Batuz in Greens Farms. Beginning of the ‘Meditacion sur la Frontier’. It marks the beginning of a continued collaboration which studies the line as a border and markedly exposes the applicability of the ‘Interrelation of Forms’ on a social dimension.

=== Schloss Schaumburg, Germany (1984-1989) ===
Begins notes on the Société Imaginarie.

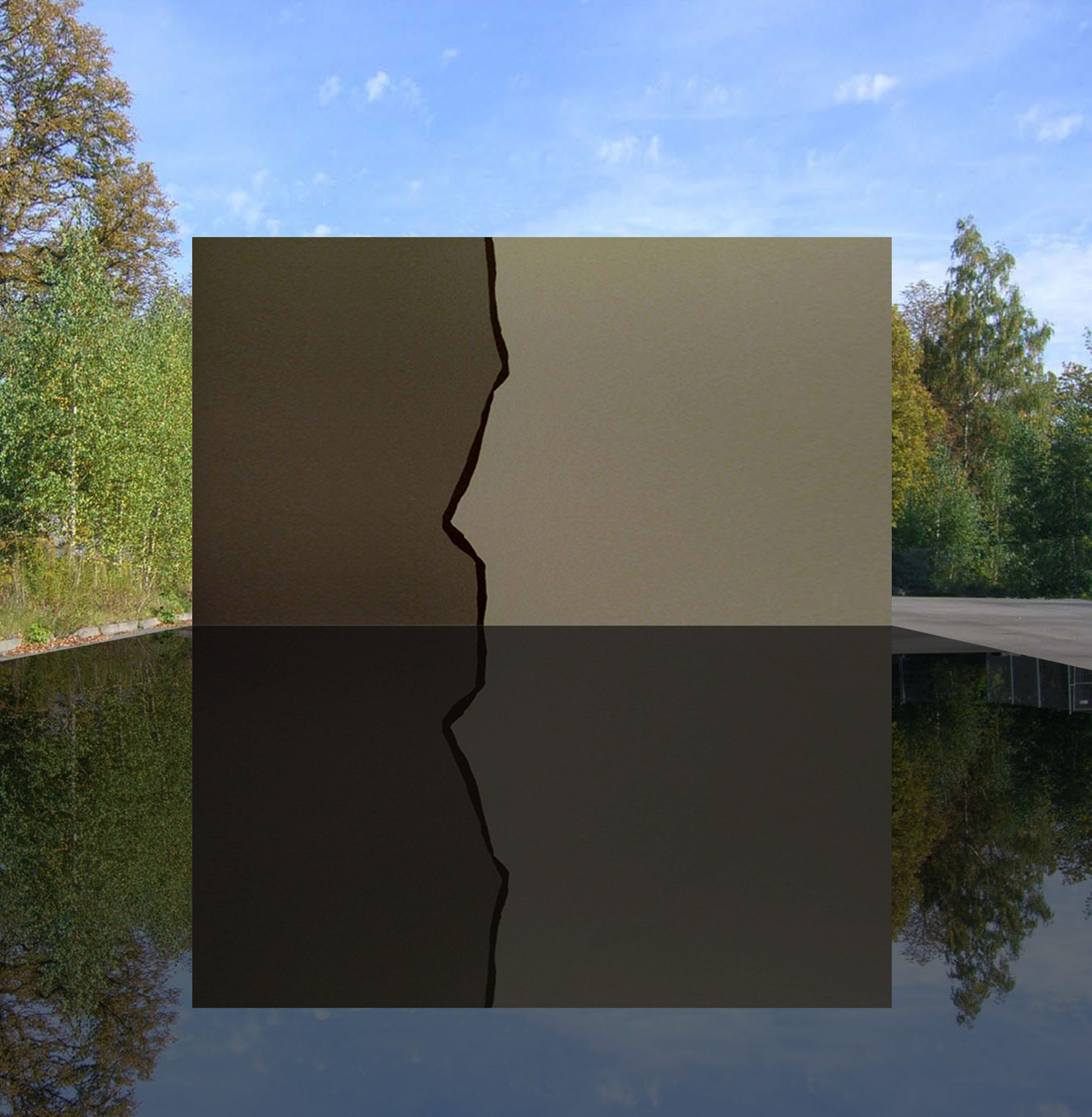
The Anti-Wall for Berlin. A Project of Batuz using one of his works. Wall and site design: Prof. Stanford Anderson with Wenjun Ge.

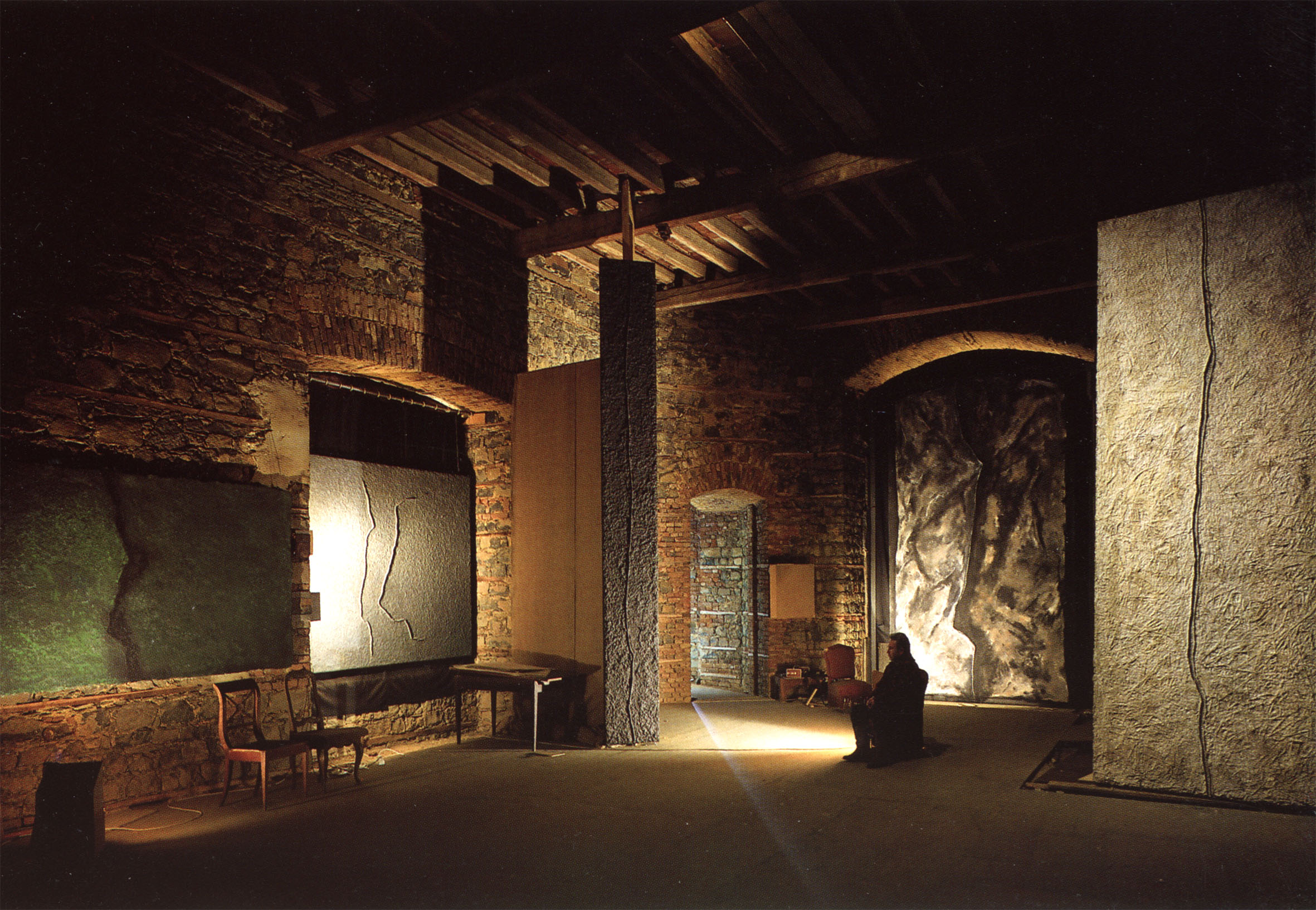
Batuz among his paintings in the Schaumburg castle

Through the intervention of the cultural authorities in West Germany, Schloss Schaumburg becomes his working and living facilities during his stay in Europe. He creates a large series of new works, between them one of the most important; the ‘Lahnthal’ painting. He is invited by the Senate of W. Berlin to create a project for a monumental sculpture for the Ernst Reuter Platz of that city. Made from living plants he decided to call it ‘The Living Wall’ and preceded in his efforts to initiate what later Ronald Reagan would proclaim with “this wall must come down”. The presentation of this working model takes place in Bad Ems in October. Michel Butor, having been present, later wrote from this experience a declarative text on illumination.

Pierre Restany visits Batuz in Schaumburg.

Batuz travels throughout the Americas meeting with his peers and begins to further formulate his idea for the Société Imaginaire. His trip starts with a stop in Mexico City with Octavio Paz, who calls him “the president of our Société Imaginaire” and ends in Buenos Aires with Enrique Molina.

In 1990 one of the first formal meetings of the Société Imaginaire is organized in Berlin and is attended by numerous illustrious members who contribute texts that form the formative principles of the undertaking. Batuz begins to paint less and concentrates his efforts on the undertaking which will remain his main priority for the remainder of his life. Butor writes that Batuz “no longer paints with brushes but with people”.

As a consequence to bringing together like-minded people he creates in collaboration with different artists the ‘Argentine Portfolio’ in 1991. It is the first of many portfolios that will consequently follow and which become the physical documentations of his endeavors that bring together people from various parts of the world. The written contributions from these participants illustrated by others become the contents of the portfolios.

A further initiative to consolidate the efforts of the members spread across the world, Batuz begins the project ‘Correspondence’. He has authors undergo a long-standing exchange of letters which would in their end create a mutual understanding through the illumination of their different perspectives. Enrique Molina exchanged with Miklos Meszöly and Alvaro Mutis with Michel Butor. Their examples would later be followed by future members and participants of the Société Imaginaire.

Batuz leaves Schloss Schaumburg and begins searching for his next headquarters. Association with leading professors from institutes such as Harvard, MIT, and Georgetown begins. Stanislaw Baranczak, Seamus Heaney, Edward O. Wilson, Leo Marx, Stanford Anderson are but a few who became members of the Société Imaginaire. Meeting with Stratis Haviaras, former editor of the Harvard Review. Reporting on the happenings of the Société Imaginaire, Haviaras begins to include individual chapters in each edition for the next coming years.

=== Altzella, Germany (1993-2005) ===
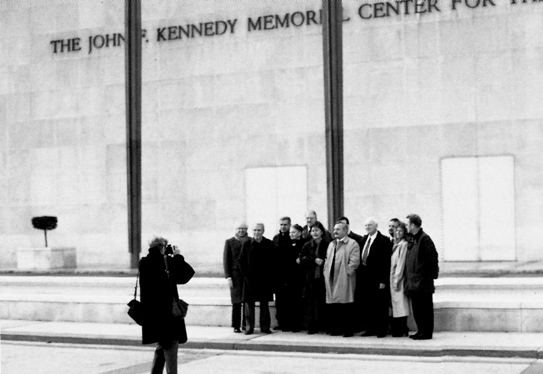
Gathered in front of Kennedy Center

The Kennedy Center on its 25th anniversary honors Batuz by inviting him and the Société Imaginaire to hold their meetings at the center for the duration of one week. Batuz is given the Kloster Park Altzella as a place to establish working centers. A publication illustrating the grounds, workshops, programs and opportunities created by Batuz at Altzella is published. Artists, professors, and students of all kinds from around the world are invited to participate in these workshops.

Throughout the next upcoming years Altzella serves as a laboratory for several cultural experiments. Implementing the methods of the Société Imaginaire into myriads of projects, Batuz extends its ideals to thousands of participants in cooperation with various institutions. Apropos to these projects, portfolios are continually created which include works from heads of states, such as Richard von Weizsäcker, Julio Maria Sanguinetti, Michal Kovac, Pastrana Borrero, from artists and writers such as Czeslaw Milosz, Alvaro Mutis, Arthur Miller, Hans Magnus Enzensberger, Seamus Heaney, Mark Strand, Raul Lozza, Michael Morgner, to name but a few, together with people from all sectors of life. The National Gallery of Art in Washington DC under the direction of Henry A. Millon becomes a permanent repository of all portfolios and creates a separate archive in its library for these works.

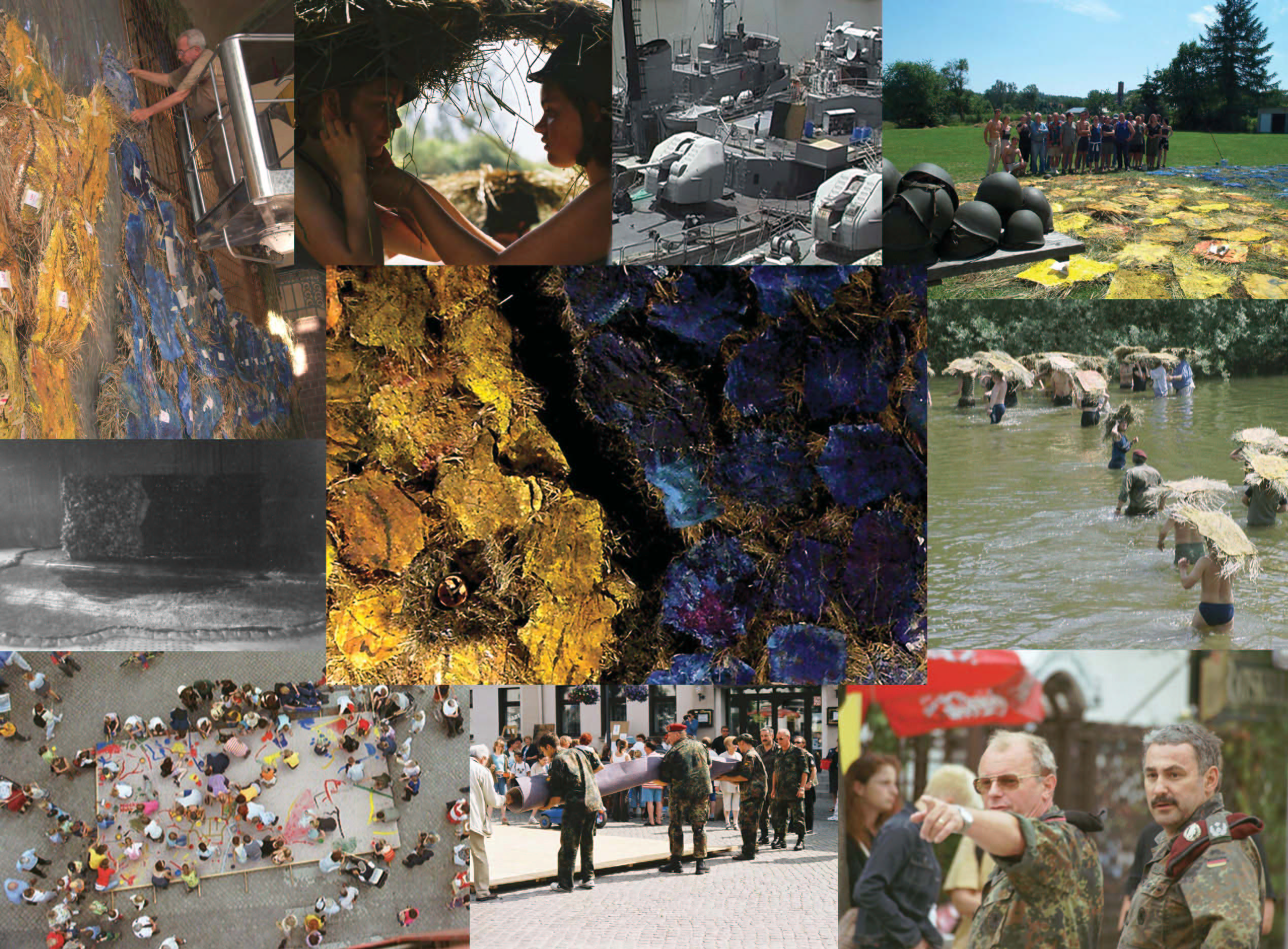
Creating a living peace of art. People visualize the artwork.

Though forever formative, and the Société Imaginaire being nothing other than a social representation of his study on the ‘Interrelation of Forms’, Batuz begins to integrate his artistic works directly into upcoming projects. The ongoing project ‘no más fronteras’ is implemented in the year 2004 on the German-Polish border in the river Neisse together with the cooperation of former General Inspecteur Hans-Peter von Kirchbach. The border between the two nations becomes symbolically overcome in the act. With civilians and members of the military of both countries standing together in the middle of the river, a physical representation of one of Batuz’ painting is composed to symbolize this mutual will.

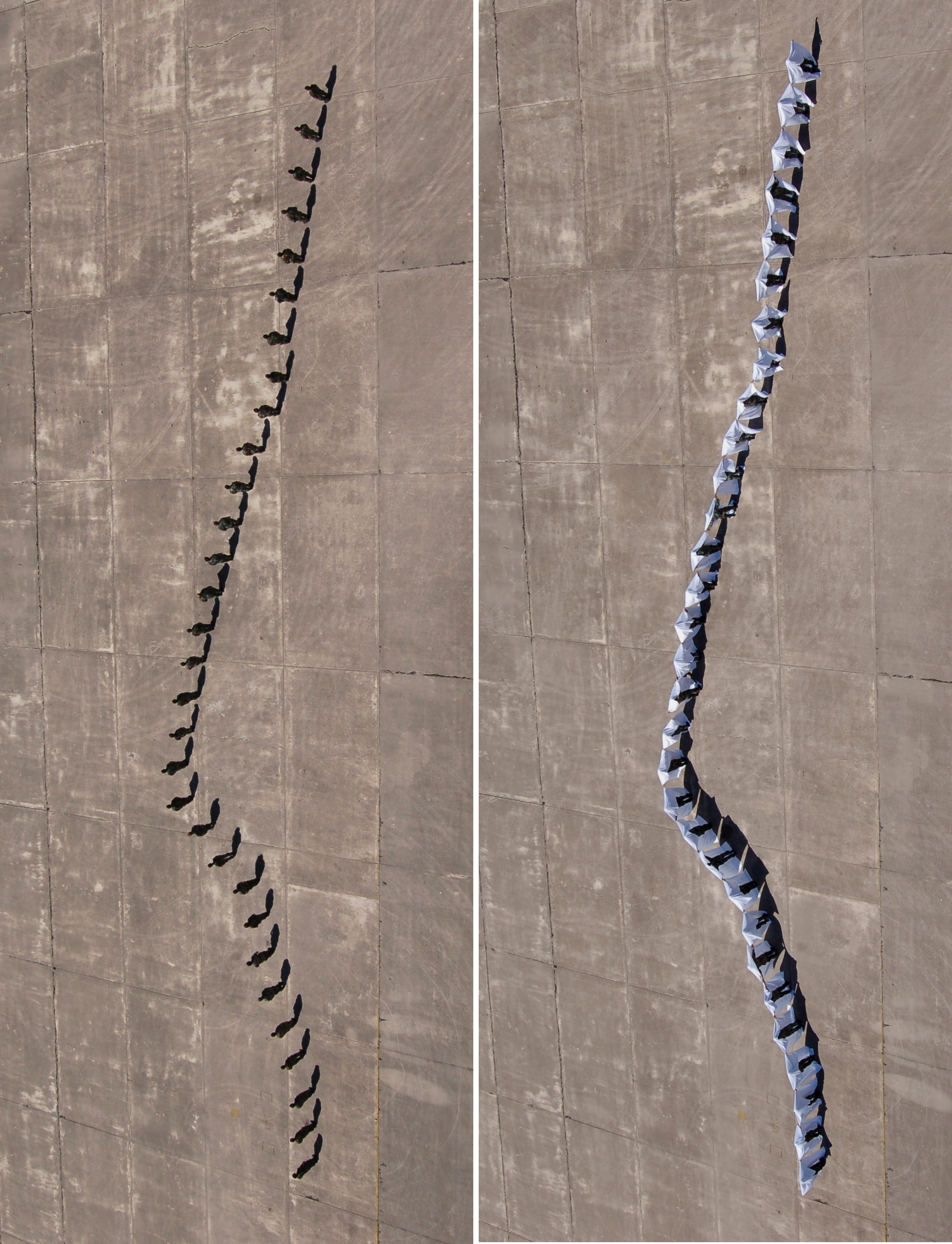
A human chain. Preparation for the Batuz' project "no mas fronteras" in Antarctica. Instead of using brushes Batuz "paints" with people.

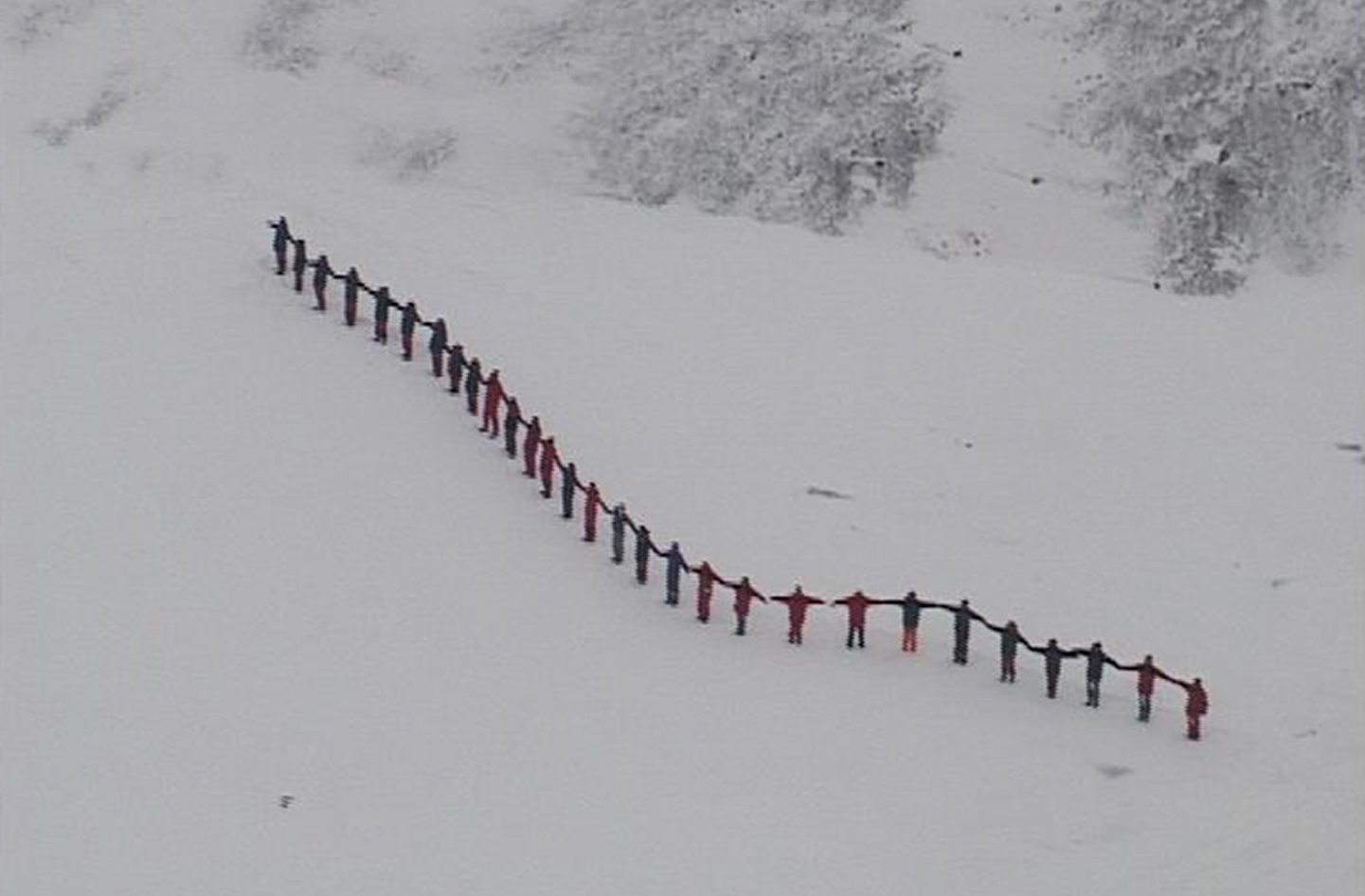
Batuz created his famous "border" in Antarctica

In 2006, together with support from the Uruguayan government and military, Batuz goes to Antarctica and realizes, with scientists from different nationalities posted throughout the continent together with members of the military, his project ‘no mas fronteras en la Antartida’. Along the endless background of snow and ice, aerial documentation is taken of the participants forming a line that reenacts the image of his painting held in the collection of the Guggenheim museum.

With a change of government in Saxony, Batuz is forced to leave Altzella and reestablishes his headquarters in the newly acquired Villa X. Therein the archive of the Société Imaginaire is created together with a private exhibition.

In 2009, the preliminary enactment of ‘no mas fronteras en Afghanistan’ is made possible through the support of 200 soldiers of the Panzergrenadierbrigade 37 of Frankenberg in conjunction with local civilians. It would finally be implemented in Afghanistan, through the support of the German Minister of Defense Karl-Theodor zu Guttenberg, in the fall of 2010 when Batuz’ visits and promotes the project in cooperation with members of the international joint armed forces and various Afghanistan locals.

== Société Imaginaire ==
In the ominous year 1984 Batuz founded the Société Imaginaire. It is “an undertaking that strives for cultural dialogue. It has applied itself through multifarious projects, continuously aiming at the same goal but doing so through different means. The great ambition of all the undertakings projects, no matter in what form its method is applied, continuously aims towards the same ideal. Overcoming borders, whether they are the physical ones that are imposed between regions, or even the imperceptible ones that arise socially, the projects bring together the various peoples divided and by having them communicate through art, they virtually overcome these conflicts by exposing a common desire that is shared individually yet globally.”

Mark Strand once wrote that the Société Imaginaire “is always being born, always in the act of becoming, and cannot be pinned down. In this it resembles most a work of art, but one in which we are offered the possibility of living.”

Many prominent personalities joined the Société Imaginaire. Some of them are: Stanford Anderson, Patricio Aylwin, Misael Pastrana Borrero, Michel Butor, Lucio Cáceres, Fernando Henrique Cardoso, Javier Carrau, Hans Magnus Enzensberger, Alberto Guani, Toshio Hara, Seamus Heaney, Olga M. Hirshhorn, Bruce Kaiser, Timothy Keating, Hans-Peter von Kirchbach, John C. Kornblum, Oscar P. Landmann, Arthur Miller, Henry A. Millon, Czesław Miłosz, Enrique Molina, Inge Morath, Alvaro Mutis, Octavio Paz, Nazir Peroz, Dieter Ronte, Julio María Sanguinetti, Hans Ulrich Spohn, Mark Strand

== Helmets for Peace ==
Initiated by Batuz and overseen by an organization bearing the same name, Helmets for Peace is “a multifaceted project, an application and representation of the method of the Société Imaginaire. The project, focusing on the armed forces as an organized institution whose members worldwide experience and share vast similarities, brings participants together by exercising the method of the SI of providing direct communication. Through this direct communication where members of the armed forces worldwide, together with those participating from the civilian sector, contribute a message of adherence to the principle ‘no mas fronteras’, voicing this common desire of overcoming borders through the artwork they help to produce together.”

== Publications ==
=== Catalogues ===
- Schloß Schaumburg 1988
- Schaumburg Edition I
- Schaumburg Edition II
- Schaumburg Edition III
- Batuz In Schaumburg
- Berlin Meeting 1991
- Budmerice Meeting 1993
- Altzella Plannung
- Liptov
- Société Imaginaire St. Augustin
- Société Imaginaire
- Kennedy Center 1995
- Lozza/Glöckner
- Société Imaginaire Chemnitzer Rathaus
- Inge Morath and the Société Imaginaire
- Altzella I
- Testoni
- Pascale
- Altzella II
- Premio Schering
- Falkland Island-Tucuman
- no más Fronteras
- Communication Through Art
- no más fronteras OAS
- Project For Berlin 1984
- Gulbenkian
- Caixa
- Phillips Collection

=== Books ===
- Batuz: Works in Paper by Rafael Squirru, D. Ronte, R. A. Kuchta e C. Heigl, New York, Rizzoli International Publications, 1981.
- A Book On My Own (in progress)

=== Articles in Harvard Review ===
- Fall 1992
- Spring 1994
- Fall 1994
- Spring 1995
- Fall 1995
- Spring 1996
- Fall 1996
- Spring 1997
- Fall 1997
- Spring 1998
- Fall 1998
- Spring 2000

== Works in public collections ==
- Albright-Knox Gallery, Buffalo, New York, U.S.A.
- Caixa de Pensions, Barcelona, Spain
- Bayerische Staatsgemäldesammlungen, Munich, Germany
- Solomon R. Guggenheim Museum, New York, U.S.A.
- Kunsthaus Zurich, Switzerland
- Pan American Union, Washington D.C., U.S.A.
- Musee des Beaux Arts, Zürich, Switzerland
- The Hirshhorn Museum & Sculpture Garden, Washington, DC, U.S.A.
- Wallraf-Richartz-Museum & Museum Ludwig, Cologne, Germany
- Museu de Arte de São Paulo, Brazil
- Museu de Arte Moderno, Rio de Janeiro, Brazil
- Museo de Bellas Artes, Caracas, Venezuela
- Kunsthalle, Nuremberg, Germany
- Museo de Arte Contemporäneo, Madrid, Spain
- Museo de Arte Moderno, Buenos Aires, Argentina
- The Metropolitan Museum, Miami, Florida, U.S.A.
- Museo Nacional de Bellas Artes, Montevideo, Uruguay
- The Litchfield Historic Museum, Connecticut, U.S.A.
- The Bruce Museum, Greenwich, Connecticut, U.S.A.
- Museum of Art, Science & Industry & Planetarium, Bridgeport, Connecticut, U.S.A.
- The New Brunswick Museum, Saint John, Canada
- Museo de Bellas Artes, Santiago de Chile
- The Phillips Collection, Washington, DC, U.S.A.
- Indianapolis Museum of Art, Indianapolis, Ind. U.S.A.
- Everson Museum of Art, Syracuse & Onondaga County, NY, U. S.A.
- Nationalgalerie, Staatliche Museen Preussischer Kulturbesitz, Berlin, Germany
- Museum Moderner Kunst, Vienna, Austria
- Fundação Calouste Gulbenkian, Lisboa, Portugal
- Hara Museum of Contemporary Art, Tokyo, Japan
- National Gallery of Art, Washington D.C., U.S.A.
