= Leonardo Castellani =

Argentine Catholic priest, essayist, novelist, poet and theologian

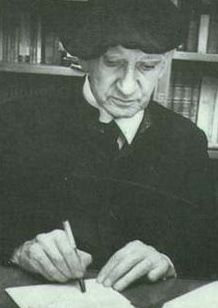
Leonardo Castellani

Leonardo Castellani (November 16, 1899 – March 15, 1981) was an Argentine priest, essayist, novelist, poet and theologian.

Born in Reconquista, Santa Fe, Castellani was ordained as a Jesuit priest in 1930, he studied Philosophy and Theology in Rome. Back in his country, he worked in the Catholic press and went into politics as a representative of Catholic nationalism. He was among the candidates of the Alianza Nacionalista party for a seat in Congress in the 1946 elections. Between 1946 and 1949 he clashed with his own Society of Jesus, who promptly sent him to a two-year confinement in Manresa (Spain). After his petition to attend his brother's funeral was refused, Castellani escaped from Manresa returning to Argentina. He was then expelled from the order and suspended from his functions as a priest, which were repristinated in 1966.

Castellani has left a considerable bulk of essays, novels, tales and poetry. Among the wide range of subjects he tackled, his religious writings deserve a special place, especially his sermons on the gospels and his exegesis of John's Apocalypse. His prolific intellectual production includes a commented edition of St. Thomas Aquinas’ Summa Theologica. One of his last books is dedicated to Søren Kierkegaard, for whom he nurtured a great admiration. Father Castellani's style is forceful, lively and of an acute intelligence.

Considering his right wing sympathies earned him the dislike of the progressive left wing intelligentsia on the one hand while his conflicts with the Jesuit order spawned the mistrust of weighty sectors of the Catholic world, it is no surprise that Castellani's work has never reached the position it deserves among Argentine letters. Apart from a restricted group of fervent admirers such as Argentine writers Rafael Squirru and Sebastian Randle (author of a voluminous biography of the priest published by Vortice in 2003) and Cardinal Antonio Quarracino who consider him one of the most significant Argentine intellectuals of the twentieth century, Castellani's work is rather unknown in his own country, especially outside Catholic and Traditionalist circles.

== Main Works ==
=== Essay ===
Religion:

- Cristo ¿vuelve o no vuelve? (1951)
- El ruiseñor fusilado (El místico) (1952)
- El Evangelio de Jesucristo (1957)
- Las parábolas de Cristo (1959)
- Doce parábolas cimarronas (1960)
- El Apokalypsis de San Juan (1963)
- Domingueras prédicas (1997)
- Domingueras prédicas II (1998) id.
- Cristo y los fariseos (1999)

Philosophy, Psychology:

- La catharsis catholique dans les exercises spirituels d'Ignace de Loyola (1934)
- Conversación y crítica filosófica (1941)
- Suma teológica - Santo Tomás de Aquino (1944)
- De Kierkegaard a Tomás de Aquino (1973)
- Psicología humana (1995)
- Freud (1996)
- San Agustín y nosotros (2000)

Politic, Literary Criticism

- La reforma de la enseñanza (1939)
- El nuevo gobierno de Sancho (1942)
- Las canciones de Militis (1945)
- Crítica Literaria (1945)
- Lugones. Sentir la Argentina (1964)
- Decíamos ayer (1968)
- Nueva crítica Literaria (1976)
- Las ideas de mi tío el cura (1984)
- Castellani por Castellani (1999)
- Un país de Jauja (1999)

=== Fiction ===
- Bichos y personas (Camperas) (1931)
- Historias del Norte bravo (1936)
- Martita Ofelia y otros cuentos de fantasmas (1939)
- Las muertes del Padre Metri (1942)
- Los papeles de Benjamín Benavides (1954)
- Su majestad Dulcinea (1956)
- El enigma del fantasma en coche (1958)
- El crimen de Ducadelia y otros cuentos del trío (1959)
- Juan XXIII (XXIV) (1964)

=== Poetry ===
- El libro de las oraciones (1951)
- La muerte de Martín Fierro (1953)
