= Rafael Squirru =

Argentine art writer (1925–2016)

- Born: March 23, 1925; Buenos Aires, Argentina
- Died: 5 March 2016 (aged 90); Buenos Aires, Argentina
- Education: Law degree
- Alma mater: University of Edinburgh
- Occupations: Lecturer; poet; art critic; essayist; translator
- Website: www.rafaelsquirru.com

Rafael Fernando Squirru (March 23, 1925 – March 5, 2016) was an Argentine poet, lecturer, art critic and essayist.

== Biographical notes ==
Born and raised in Buenos Aires, Squirru was educated at Saint Andrew's Scot School and at the Jesuit El Salvador Secondary School. He graduated with a Law Degree at the University of Edinburgh in 1948.

After founding the Buenos Aires Museum of Modern Art in 1956, he went on to champion the cause of Argentine and Latin American art as Director of Cultural Affairs (1960) in the government of Arturo Frondizi. Among his many initiatives of that period, Alicia Penalba’s sculptures and Antonio Berni’s etchings were sent to the São Paulo and Venice Biennales respectively, both artists obtaining First Prize.

Named Cultural Director of the Organization of American States (OAS) in 1963 with headquarters in Washington, D.C., he continued his task of promotion of North and Latin American culture until his resignation in 1970. It was at this time that he supported the construction of the impressive memorial monument to U.S. President John F. Kennedy by Uruguayan artist Lincoln Presno in Quemú Quemú, a vast deserted plain in the Argentine province of La Pampa; his outspoken inauguration speech as official representative of the OAS, pronounced during the military government of General Juan Carlos Onganía, won public acclaim while provoking angry reactions on the part of the authorities present, earning him the local government’s condemnation as persona non grata, revoked a few years later.

Back in Buenos Aires he has supported culture in all its forms through an incessant activity of lectures in his own country and abroad, prologues for artists’ exhibitions and a constant output of articles on Argentine daily La Nación, with which he collaborated for over twenty years, often sharing the Culture page with Jorge Luis Borges during the Eighties.

Several volumes of Squirru’s poetry and prose writings have been published over the years, most of which are today out of print and considerably difficult to find.

His friends, correspondents and acquaintances included such personalities as Henry Miller, Fernando Demaría, Thomas Merton, Edward Hopper, Ned O'Gorman, Huntington Hartford, Sir Herbert Read, Edward Albee, Oswaldo Vigas, Julio Cortázar, Olga Blinder, Alejandra Pizarnik, Barnaby Conrad, Paul Blackburn, Amancio Williams, Jackie Kennedy and Robert F. Kennedy, Batuz, Renata Adler, J. Carter Brown, Benjamin Bradlee, Nina Auchincloss Straight, Kay Halle, Alberto Ginastera, Elsa Wiezell, Hiram D. Williams, Leopoldo Marechal, Arthur Schlesinger Jr., Stefan Baciu, Emilio Pettoruti, Antonio Berni, Eduardo Mac Entyre, Pérez Celis, Leopoldo Presas, Leonardo Castellani and Marco Denevi.

== Books ==
Art criticism

- Barragán, Buenos Aires, Galería Rubbers, 1960.
- Leopoldo Presas, Buenos Aires, El Mangrullo, 1972.
- Pérez Celis, Buenos Aires, Ediciones del Hombre Nuevo, 1973.
- Albino Fernández, Buenos Aires, La Barca Gráfica, 1975.
- Antonio Berni, Buenos Aires, Dead Weight, 1975.
- Guillermo Roux, Buenos Aires, Dead Weight, 1975.
- Pintura, pintura, siete valores argentinos en el arte actual, Buenos Aires, Ediciones Arte y Crítica, 1975.
- Luis Seoane, Buenos Aires, Dead Weight, 1978.
- Liberti, Buenos Aires, Dead Weight, 1978.
- Arte de América: 25 años de crítica, Buenos Aires, Gaglianone, 1979.
- Héctor Giuffré, Buenos Aires, Gaglianone, 1980.
- Batuz (con D. Ronte, R. A. Kuchta e C. Heigl), New York, Rizzoli International Publications, 1981.
- Buenos Aires y sus esculturas, Buenos Aires, Manrique Zago, 1981.
- Eduardo Mac Entyre, Buenos Aires, Gaglianone, 1981.
- Aldo Severi, Buenos Aires, Dead Weight, 1982.
- Arte argentino hoy. Una selección de 48 artistas, Buenos Aires, Gaglianone, 1983.
- Juan Del Prete, Buenos Aires, Gaglianone, 1984.
- Mariano Pagés: 1945-1983, Buenos Aires, 1984.
- Four Contemporary Painters from Argentina: Horacio Bustos, Pérez Celis, Kenneth Kemble, Juan Carlos Liberti, University of Florida, 1986.
- Miguel Ocampo, Buenos Aires, Gaglianone, 1986.
- Kenneth Kemble, Buenos Aires, Gaglianone, 1987.
- Elena Tarasido: la opción de la libertad, Buenos Aires, Instituto Salesiano de Artes Gráficas, 1988.
- Inés Bancalari 1976-1987, Buenos Aires, Gaglianone, 1988.
- Cuarenta maestros del arte de los Argentinos (with I. Gutiérrez Zaldivar), Buenos Aires, Zurbarán, 1990.
- Gyula Kosice: obras Madi, Buenos Aires, Gaglianone, 1990.
- Quinquela: popular y clásico, Buenos Aires, 1990.
- Juan M. Sánchez, Buenos Aires, Ennio Ayosa, 1991.
- Mara Marini, Iglesias Kuppenhein, 1992.
- Carpani cabalga al tigre (con M. Vincent), Madrid, Ollero y Ramos, 1994.
- Roma Geber. Imágenes urbanas, Buenos Aires, Arte al Día, 1997.
- Leopoldo Torres Agüero, Fragments Editions, 1999.
- Perez Celis (with Frederick Ted Castle and Peter Frank), Shapolsky, 1999

Art criticism in verse

- 49 artistas de América: itinerario poético, Buenos Aires, Gaglianone, 1984.

Poetry

- La noche iluminada, Buenos Aires, Ediciones del Hombre Nuevo, 1957.
- Amor 33, Buenos Aires, Ediciones del Hombre Nuevo, 1958.
- Números, Buenos Aires, Ediciones del Hombre Nuevo, 1960.
- Awareness of Love (poetical comment on the work of Juan Downey), Washington D.C., H.K. Press, 1966.
- Poesía 1957-1966, Buenos Aires, Dead Weight, 1966.
- Poesía 1966-1970, Buenos Aires, Juárez, 1970.
- Poesía 1970-1971. La edad del cerdo y otros poemas, Buenos Aires, Dead Weight, 1971.
- Poesía 1971-1973. Quincunce americano, Buenos Aires, Dead Weight, 1973.
- Poesía 1973-1975. Cuaderno de bitácora, Buenos Aires, Dead Weight, 1975.
- Poesía 1975-1977. La Corona, Buenos Aires, Dead Weight, 1977.
- Números. Veinte años de poesía (1957-1977), Buenos Aires, La Barca Gráfica, 1977.
- Chrysopeya del buen amor, Buenos Aires, Albino y Asociados, 1986.

Essays

- Filosofía del arte abstracto, Buenos Aires, Museo de Arte Moderno, 1961.
- Leopoldo Marechal, Buenos Aires, Ediciones Culturales Argentinas, 1961.
- The Challenge of the New Man. A cultural approach to the Latin American scene, Washington D.C., Pan American Union, 1964.
- Towards a World Community, Chicago, Academy of Arts and Sciences, 1968.
- Martin Fierro (with other authors), Buenos Aires, Instituto Salesiano de Artes Gráficas, 1972.
- Claves del arte actual, Buenos Aires, Troquel, 1976.
- Ángeles y Monstruos. Ensayos Breves, Buenos Aires, Gaglianone, 1986.
- Hacia la pintura: como apreciarla, Buenos Aires, Editorial Atlántida, 1988
- Exigencias del arte, Buenos Aires, Zurbarán, 1989.
- El artista y su tiempo, Buenos Aires, Rozenblum, 1991.
- Arte y humanismo, Buenos Aires, Fundación Praxis, 1993.
- Libros y libros, cuadros y cuadros, Morón, Universidad de Morón, 1995.

Translations

- William Shakespeare, Hamlet, Buenos Aires, Dead Weight, 1976.
- William Shakespeare, La tempestad, Buenos Aires, Biblioteca Nacional, 1979.

Drama

- El Rey Salomón (drama bíblico en tres actos), Buenos Aires, Marchand Editorial, 1980.

== Books on Rafael Squirru ==
- Augusto Rodríguez Larreta, El Arte y Rafael Squirru. Ediciones del Hombre Nuevo, Buenos Aires 1951
- Marta Campomar, Rafael Squirru - ojo crítico y palabra creadora. Ediciones de arte Gaglianone, Buenos Aires 1997.
- Eloisa Squirru, Tan Rafael Squirru!, Ediciones El Elefante Blanco, Buenos Aires 2008.

== Distinctions ==
- Doctor Honoris Causa in Humanities, University of Neuquén, Argentina
- Doctor Honoris Causa in Humanities, University of Morón, Argentina
- Konex Platinum Award in Visual Arts, Konex Foundation, Buenos Aires
- Gratia Artis Prize of the Academia Nacional de Bellas Artes, Argentina
- Honorary Member of The Association of The Corcoran Gallery
- Consultant Member of the CARI (Consejo Argentino Relaciones Internacionales) of Buenos Aires
- Honorary Member of the Miguel Lillo Foundation, San Miguel de Tucumán, Argentina
- Honorary Member of the Academia de Bellas Artes of Chile
- Lorenzutti Foundation Prize for Art Criticism
