= Eduardo Mac Entyre =

Argentine artist

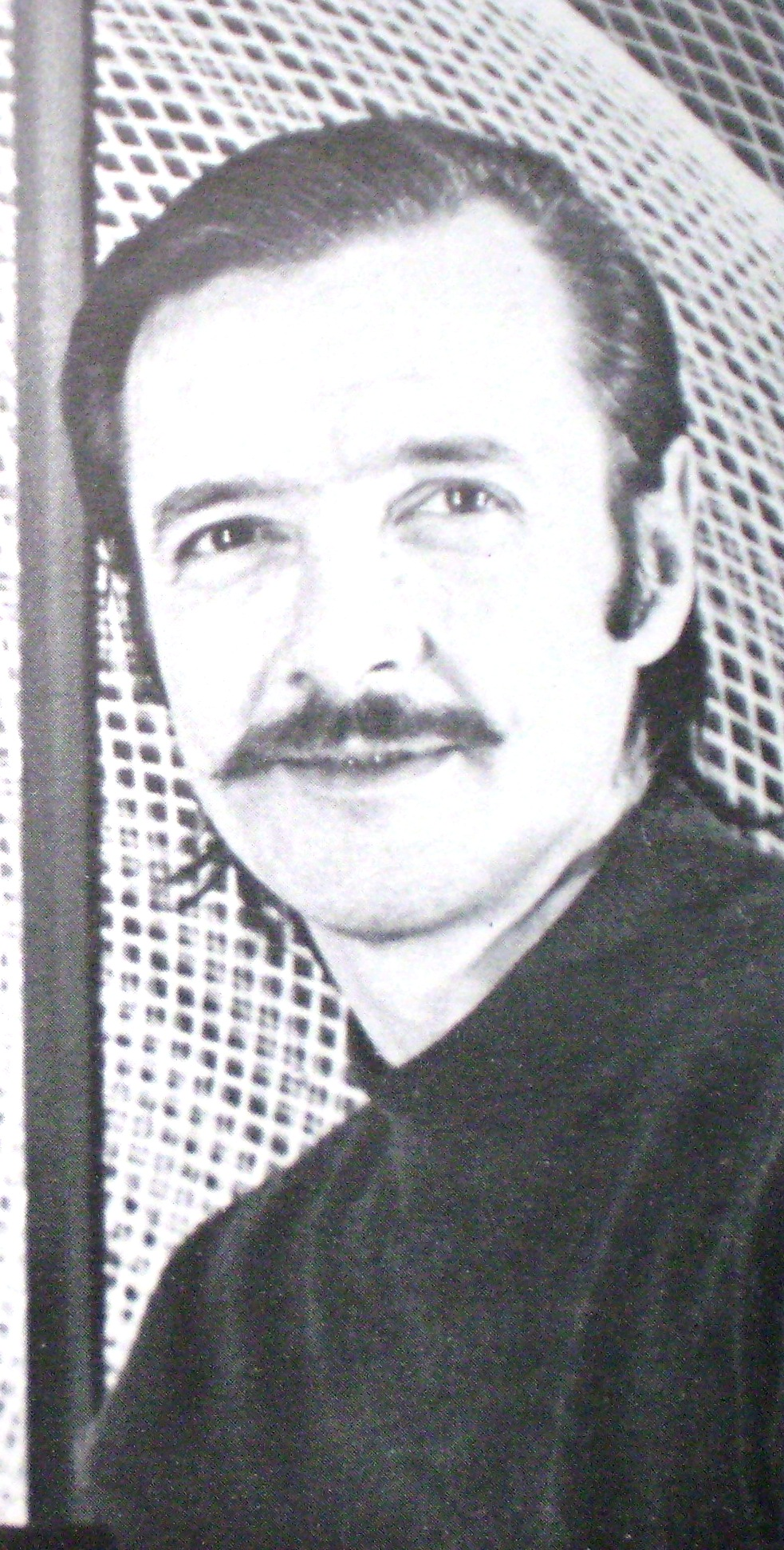
Artist Eduardo Mac Entyre and one of his helixes, c. 1980.

Eduardo Mac Entyre (20 February 1929 – 5 May 2014) was an Argentine artist known for his geometric paintings.

Born in Buenos Aires, Argentina to a Scottish father and Belgian mother, Mac Entyre began pursuing his talent for sketches at the age of twenty. Studying standards like Albrecht Dürer, Hans Holbein and Rembrandt, he later began exploring impressionist and cubist influences and his work was first displayed in 1954 at Buenos Aires' Comte Art Gallery.

Calling the attention of local arts patron Ignacio Pirovano and Buenos Aires Museum of Modern Art Director Rafael Squirru following a 1959 show at the renowned Peuser Art Gallery, Mac Entyre's work soon earned him a following among several of the city's other accomplished abstract artists, resulting in a genre they themselves described as Generative art, a movement later expanded on by world-renowned computer artists like Benoît Mandelbrot.

Mac Entyre's computer-generated work was exhibited in the Arte y Cibernética exhibition at the Galeria Bonino, Buenos Aires, from August to September 1969. The exhibition was the first in Argentina to explore the capabilities of digital imaging. It then toured other South American cities before being shown in the UK in 1970.

Sketched until relatively recently by hand following a series of random algorithms, Mac Entyre's work is reminiscent of Leonardo Fibonacci's 13th-century nautilus designs – though Mac Entyre's are more complex owing to their randomness, as each work forms a helix pattern in no two sketches. Mac Entyre created a body of more traditional Abstract, Cubist and Figurative art. He was honored by the Organization of American States in 1986 for his contribution to Modern Art in Latin America.

Mac Entyre's artworks are held in many public and private collections, including the Buffalo AKG Art Museum, the John and Mable Ringling Museum of Art and the Victoria and Albert Museum.
