= Étienne La Font de Saint-Yenne =

French art critic

- Born: 8 December 1688; Lyon, France
- Died: 16 June 1771 (aged 82); Paris, France
- Occupation: Art critic

Étienne La Font de Saint-Yenne (French pronunciation: [etjɛn la fɔ̃ də sɛ̃t‿jɛn]; born 1688 in Lyon, died 1771 in Paris) was a French art critic of the eighteenth century.

He write Réflexions sur quelques causes de l'état présent de la peinture en France in 1747, wich is considered a seminal work in art criticism.
