= Pérez Celis =

Argentine artist

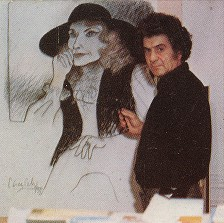
- Pérez Celis
- Born: Celis Pérez; January 15, 1939; San Telmo, Argentina
- Died: August 2, 2008 (aged 69); Buenos Aires, Argentina
- Education: Belgrano School of Fine Arts
- Known for: Painting, sculpture, murals and engravings
- Movement: Abstract art
- Spouses: Sara Fernandez (m. 1959; died 1975); Margarita Laconich (m. 1977; died 1999); Tamara Toma (m. 2001)
- Children: 2
- Awards: Alba Award at the 61st Salón Nacional de Artes Plásticas Argentino, XIV Grand Prix 1980 Montecarlo

Celis Pérez (January 15, 1939 – August 2, 2008) was an Argentine artist usually referred to as Pérez Celis. He earned international recognition for his paintings, sculptures, murals and engravings.

== Life and work ==
Pérez was born in San Telmo on the South side of Buenos Aires, and grew up in Liniers, on the opposite end of town. Working as a newsboy during childhood, he learned the basics of drawing and painting via correspondence classes. He enrolled at the Belgrano School of Fine Arts in 1954, and first exhibited at age 17, at Galería La Fantasma. Following his entry into the professional arts world, he began using his name in a reversed form. At the start of his career he has been influenced by Hungarian artist Victor Vasarely during a 1957 retrospective of the latter's works at the National Fine Arts Museum. He married Sara Fernández in 1959 and relocated to Uruguay for less than a year invited by Carlos Páez Vilaró . Took part in the "Group of 8" – proponents of abstract art among the normally conservative local audiences.

He returned to Buenos Aires in 1960, and opened a downtown atelier with the support of Guido Di Tella, his first mecena.

Pérez Celis explored geometric art, and builds his first mural, Fuerza América, in 1962. Indigenous patterns and colors would reappear in many of his productions during the 1960s and 1970s, and distinguished him from most other local artists, among whom pop art and figurative art was more influential. He was featured in more than 120 solo shows during his career, notably the Gallerie Bellechasse, Anita Shapolsky Gallery New York, Arteconsult, Boston & Panama, Witcomb, etc. and his art was purchased for many private collections and first-rate museums, including the Museum of Modern Art in New York. He received commissions from the Argentine government, which placed his works in the Ministro Pistarini International Airport, from other governments, and from prominent individuals and businesses.

Tragedy struck Pérez Celis' life in 1975, when an automobile accident killed his wife, and resulted in months of physical therapy for his injuries. He remarried, to Margarita Laconich, in 1977, and lived in Caracas, Paris, New York City, and Miami in subsequent years. He shared his time between Buenos Aires and New York in 1994, a retrospective of his work was hosted at Biblioteca Nacional visited by more than 300000 persons. He continued exhibiting in Latin America, in the Sanyo Gallery in Tokyo, the Anita Shapolsky Gallery in New York City, and at numerous universities. Among his numerous recognitions in later years was the Alba Award at the 61st Salón Nacional de Artes Plásticas Argentino, and he was proclaimed a Distinguished Citizen of the City of Buenos Aires in 2001.

He also created several literary illustrations, notably those for Jorge Luis Borges' Spanish-language translation of Walt Whitman's poem Leaves of Grass. A fan of the Club Atlético Boca Juniors football team, he created two murals in 1997 for the team's La Bombonera Stadium in Buenos Aires: "Idolos" (Idols) and "Mito y Destino" (Myth and Destiny), both Venetian mosaics and bronze on cement.

== Later years ==
His daughter, actress María José Gabín, published a biography of her father in 2007.

Pérez Celis developed leukemia, and underwent a lengthy series of treatments. Ultimately, however, the noted artist lost his life in Buenos Aires in 2008, at age 69. He was survived by his third wife, Tamara Toma and his children.

== Filmography ==
Excerpt from ¨Pérez Celis¨

- Pérez Celis, (Spanish) USA 2005. Written and directed by Eduardo Montes-Bradley. The documentary, a portrait of Pérez Celis, captures the artist at work in his atelier in Little Haiti. Throughout a series of conversations with Celis, Montes-Bradley manages to capture rare moments showing the artist at work. The creative process, the brushes on canvas, the mixing of colors, and the drawing of sketches share time on the screen with the anecdotical, and traces of a political road map followed by Celis from the mid-1940s to the present.
