= Roberto Bolaño bibliography =

The following bibliography provides a chronological list of the published works of Chilean writer Roberto Bolaño (1953–2003). It includes his fiction (novels, short stories, poems) and non-fiction (essays, speeches, interviews), both published during his lifetime and posthumously.

== Books ==
Note: Titles appearing in brackets have not yet been translated into English and are only literal indications of the original Spanish titles.

=== Novels ===
English title	Original Spanish title	Translator
The Skating Rink	La pista de hielo (1993)	Chris Andrews, August 2009
Nazi Literature in the Americas	La literatura nazi en América (1996)	Chris Andrews, February 2008
Distant Star	Estrella distante (1996)	Chris Andrews, December 2004
The Savage Detectives	Los detectives salvajes (1998)	Natasha Wimmer, April 2007
Amulet	Amuleto (1999)	Chris Andrews, January 2007
Monsieur Pain	Monsieur Pain (1999) retitled reprint of small-press La senda de los elefantes (1984, written 1981-1982)	Chris Andrews, January 2010
By Night in Chile	Nocturno de Chile (2000)	Chris Andrews, December 2003
Antwerp	Amberes (2002, written 1980)	Natasha Wimmer, April 2010
A Little Lumpen Novelita	Una novelita lumpen (2002, written 2001)	Natasha Wimmer, September 2014
2666	2666 (2004, written 1999-2003)	Natasha Wimmer, November 2008
The Third Reich	El Tercer Reich (2010, written 1989)	Natasha Wimmer, November 2011
Woes of the True Policeman	Los sinsabores del verdadero policía (2011, written 198x-2003)	Natasha Wimmer, November 2012
The Spirit of Science Fiction	El espíritu de la ciencia-ficción (2016, written 1984)	Natasha Wimmer, February 2019
Diorama	Diorama	(not yet published or translated)

=== Short story collections ===
English title	Original Spanish publication	Translator
Last Evenings on Earth	Selection of stories from Putas Asesinas (2001) and Llamadas Telefónicas (1997)	Chris Andrews, April 2007
The Return	Stories from Putas Asesinas and Llamadas Telefónicas not collected in Last Evenings on Earth	Chris Andrews, June 2010
The Insufferable Gaucho	El Gaucho Insufrible (2003)	Chris Andrews, August 2010
The Secret of Evil	El Secreto del Mal (2007)	Chris Andrews, April 2012
Cowboy Graves	Sepulcros de vaqueros (2017)	Natasha Wimmer, February 2021

=== Poetry collections ===
English title	Original Spanish title	Translator	Notes
Reinventing Love	Reinventar el amor (1976)		20-page booklet in México (first publication)
Fragments from the Unknown University	Fragmentos de la Universidad Desconocida (1992)		Poems (1978–1992), reprinted in La Universidad Desconocida
The Romantic Dogs	Los Perros Románticos: Poemas 1980-1998 (2000) (revised from Los Perros Románticos: Poemas 1977-1990, 1993)	Laura Healy, 2008	43 poems written from 1980 to 1998
The Last Savage	El último salvaje (1995)		Poems (1990-1993), reprinted in La Universidad Desconocida
Tres	Tres (2000)	Laura Healy, September 2011	Three poem sequences written in 1981, 1993, and 1994
The Unknown University	La Universidad Desconocida (2007)	Laura Healy, July 2013	Includes selection from the previous collections, uncollected poetry and the novella Antwerp (under the title "People Walking Away")

=== Other books ===
Title	Original Spanish title	Translation	Contents
Advice from a Morrison Disciple to a Joyce Fanatic	Consejos de un discípulo de Morrison a un fanático de Joyce (1984)	Untranslated	Novel written in 1983 in collaboration with A. G. Porta
Between Parentheses	Entre paréntesis (2004)	Natasha Wimmer, May 2011	Collection of essays, articles, and speeches (1998–2003)
Roberto Bolaño: The Last Interview & Other Conversations	Originally published in English	Sybil Perez, November 2009	Collection of four interviews with Bolaño (1999–2003)
Bolaño By Himself	Bolaño por sí mismo (2011)	Untranslated	Collection of interviews with Bolaño (1998–2003)

== Pieces ==
=== Short stories ===
Note: Four essays collected within short-story books are listed here tagged with "[essay]".

English title	Original Spanish title	Original Spanish collection	English collection
Sensini	Sensini	Llamadas Telefónicas, 1997	Last Evenings on Earth, 2006
Henri Simon Leprince	Henri Simon Leprince	Llamadas Telefónicas, 1997	Last Evenings on Earth, 2006
Enrique Martín	Enrique Martín	Llamadas Telefónicas, 1997	Last Evenings on Earth, 2006
A Literary Adventure	Una Aventura Literaria	Llamadas Telefónicas, 1997	Last Evenings on Earth, 2006
Phone Calls	Llamadas Telefónicas	Llamadas Telefónicas, 1997	Last Evenings on Earth, 2006
The Grub	El Gusano	Llamadas Telefónicas, 1997	Last Evenings on Earth, 2006
Snow	La Nieve	Llamadas Telefónicas, 1997	The Return, 2010
Another Russian Tale	Otro Cuento Ruso	Llamadas Telefónicas, 1997	The Return, 2010
William Burns	William Burns	Llamadas Telefónicas, 1997	The Return, 2010
Detectives	Detectives	Llamadas Telefónicas, 1997	The Return, 2010
Cell Mates	Compañeros de Celda	Llamadas Telefónicas, 1997	The Return, 2010
Clara	Clara	Llamadas Telefónicas, 1997	The Return, 2010
Joanna Silvestri	Joanna Silvestri	Llamadas Telefónicas, 1997	The Return, 2010
Anne Moore's Life	Vida de Anne Moore	Llamadas Telefónicas, 1997	Last Evenings on Earth, 2006
Mauricio ("The Eye") Silva	El Ojo Silva	Putas Asesinas, 2001	Last Evenings on Earth, 2006
Gómez Palacio	Gómez Palacio	Putas Asesinas, 2001	Last Evenings on Earth, 2006
Last Evenings on Earth	Últimos Atardeceres en la Tierra	Putas Asesinas, 2001	Last Evenings on Earth, 2006
Days of 1978	Días de 1978	Putas Asesinas, 2001	Last Evenings on Earth, 2006
Vagabond in France and Belgium	Vagabundo en Francia y Bélgica	Putas Asesinas, 2001	Last Evenings on Earth, 2006
Prefiguration of Lalo Cura	Prefiguración de Lalo Cura	Putas Asesinas, 2001	The Return, 2010
Murdering Whores	Putas Asesinas	Putas Asesinas, 2001	The Return, 2010
The Return	El Retorno	Putas Asesinas, 2001	The Return, 2010
Buba	Buba	Putas Asesinas, 2001	The Return, 2010
Dentist	Dentista	Putas Asesinas, 2001	Last Evenings on Earth, 2006
Photos	Fotos	Putas Asesinas, 2001	The Return, 2010
Dance Card	Carnet de Baile	Putas Asesinas, 2001	Last Evenings on Earth, 2006
Meeting with Enrique Lihn	Encuentro con Enrique Lihn	Putas Asesinas, 2001	The Return, 2010
Jim	Jim	El Gaucho Insufrible, 2003	The Insufferable Gaucho, 2010; Between Parentheses, 2011
The Insufferable Gaucho	El Gaucho Insufrible	El Gaucho Insufrible, 2003	The Insufferable Gaucho, 2010
Police Rat	El Policía de las Ratas	El Gaucho Insufrible, 2003	The Insufferable Gaucho, 2010
Alvaro Rousselot’s Journey	El Viaje de Álvaro Rousselot	El Gaucho Insufrible, 2003	The Insufferable Gaucho, 2010
Two Catholic Tales	Dos Cuentos Católicos	El Gaucho Insufrible, 2003	The Insufferable Gaucho, 2010
Literature + Illness = Illness [essay]	Literatura + Enfermedad = Enfermedad	El Gaucho Insufrible, 2003	The Insufferable Gaucho, 2010
The Myths of Cthulhu [essay]	Los Mitos de Cthulhu	El Gaucho Insufrible, 2003	The Insufferable Gaucho, 2010
Colonia Lindavista	La Colonia Lindavista	El Secreto del Mal, 2007	The Secret of Evil, 2012
The Secret of Evil	El Secreto del Mal	El Secreto del Mal, 2007	The Secret of Evil, 2012
The Old Man of the Mountain	El Viejo de la Montaña	El Secreto del Mal, 2007	The Secret of Evil, 2012
The Colonel's Son	El Hijo del Coronel	El Secreto del Mal, 2007	The Secret of Evil, 2012
Scholars of Sodom	Sabios de Sodoma	El Secreto del Mal, 2007	The Secret of Evil, 2012
The Room Next Door	La Habitación de al Lado	El Secreto del Mal, 2007	The Secret of Evil, 2012
Labyrinth	Laberinto	El Secreto del Mal, 2007	The Secret of Evil, 2012
Vagaries of the Literature of Doom [essay]	Derivas de la Pesada	El Secreto del Mal, 2007	The Secret of Evil, 2012; Between Parentheses, 2011
Crimes	Crímenes	El Secreto del Mal, 2007	The Secret of Evil, 2012
I Can't Read	No Sé Leer	El Secreto del Mal, 2007	The Secret of Evil, 2012
Beach [short story, originally considered an essay]	Playa	El Secreto del Mal, 2007	The Secret of Evil, 2012; Between Parentheses, 2011
Muscles	Músculos	El Secreto del Mal, 2007	The Secret of Evil, 2012
The Tour	La Gira	El Secreto del Mal, 2007	The Secret of Evil, 2012
Daniela	Daniela	El Secreto del Mal, 2007	The Secret of Evil, 2012
Suntan	Bronceado	El Secreto del Mal, 2007	The Secret of Evil, 2012
Death of Ulises	Muerte de Ulises	El Secreto del Mal, 2007	The Secret of Evil, 2012
The Trouble-maker	El Provocador	El Secreto del Mal, 2007	The Secret of Evil, 2012
Sevilla Kills Me [essay]	Sevilla me Mata	El Secreto del Mal, 2007	The Secret of Evil, 2012; Between Parentheses, 2011
The Days of Chaos	Las Jornadas del Caos	El Secreto del Mal, 2007	The Secret of Evil, 2012
Mexican manifesto	Manifesto Mexicano	El espíritu de la ciencia-ficción, 2016	postscript to The Spirit of Science Fiction, 2018
Cowboy Graves	Sepulcros de vaqueros	Sepulcros de vaqueros, 2017	Cowboy Graves, 2021
Fatherland	Patria	Sepulcros de vaqueros, 2017	Cowboy Graves, 2021
French Comedy of Horrors	Comedia del horror de Francia	Sepulcros de vaqueros, 2017	Cowboy Graves, 2021

=== Poems ===
English title	Original Spanish title	Collection	Notes
The Romantic Dogs	Los Perros Románticos	The Romantic Dogs; The Unknown University	
Self Portrait at Twenty Years	Autorretrato a los viente años	The Romantic Dogs; The Unknown University	
Resurrection	Resurrección	The Romantic Dogs; The Unknown University	
In the Reading Room of Hell		The Romantic Dogs; The Unknown University	
Soni	Soni	The Romantic Dogs	
Ernesto Cardenal and I	Ernesto Cardenal y yo	The Romantic Dogs; The Unknown University	
Day Bleeding Rain		The Romantic Dogs	
The Worm	El Gusano	The Romantic Dogs; The Unknown University	
Lupe	Lupe	The Romantic Dogs; The Unknown University	
The Front Line	Los Artilleros	The Romantic Dogs; The Unknown University	
La Francesa	La francesa	The Romantic Dogs	
The Outsider Ape	El mono exterior	The Romantic Dogs	
Dirty, Poorly Dressed		The Romantic Dogs	
I Dreamt of Frozen Detectives		The Romantic Dogs; The Unknown University	
The Detectives		The Romantic Dogs; The Unknown University	
The Lost Detectives		The Romantic Dogs; The Unknown University	
The Frozen Detectives		The Romantic Dogs; The Unknown University	
Fragments	Fragmentos	The Romantic Dogs; The Unknown University	
The Ghost of Edna Lieberman		The Romantic Dogs; The Unknown University	
Visit to the Convalescent		The Romantic Dogs	
Godzilla in Mexico		The Romantic Dogs	
Verses by Juan Ramón	Versos de Juan Ramón	The Romantic Dogs; The Unknown University	
Dino Campana Revises His Biography in Castel Pulci Psychiatric Hospital		The Romantic Dogs	
Palingenesis	Palingenesia	The Romantic Dogs; The Unknown University	
The Nurses		The Romantic Dogs; The Unknown University	
Twilight in Barcelona		The Romantic Dogs; The Unknown University	
The Greek		The Romantic Dogs; The Unknown University	
Mr. Wiltshire	El senor Wiltshire	The Romantic Dogs; The Unknown University	
Rain	Lluvia	The Romantic Dogs; The Unknown University	
Luck	Lasuerte	The Romantic Dogs; The Unknown University	
X-Rays	Rayos X	The Romantic Dogs	
The Last Love Song of Pedro J. Lastarria, Alias "El Chorito"		The Romantic Dogs; The Unknown University	
My Life in the Tubes of Survival		The Romantic Dogs; The Unknown University	
On the Edge of the Cliff		The Romantic Dogs	
Roadster		The Romantic Dogs	
The Last Savage		The Romantic Dogs; The Unknown University	
Half-Baked		The Romantic Dogs	
Atole	Atole	The Romantic Dogs; The Unknown University	
The Donkey	El burro	The Romantic Dogs; The Unknown University	
Parra's Footsteps		The Romantic Dogs	
I'll Try to Forget		The Romantic Dogs	
Muse	Musa	The Romantic Dogs; The Unknown University	
With the Flies	Entre las moscas	The Romantic Dogs; The Unknown University	
Prose from Autumn in Gerona	Prosa del otono en Gerona	Tres; The Unknown University	35 prose poems
The Neochileans	Los neochilenos	Tres; The Unknown University	
A Stroll Through Literature	Un paseo por la literatura	Tres	sequence of 57 poems
People Walking Away		The Unknown University	a slightly different version of Antwerp
Roberto Bolaño’s Devotion		The Unknown University	
Trees	Arboles	The Unknown University	
The Monk	El monje	The Unknown University	
The Snow-Novel	La novela-nieve	The Unknown University	
Daybreak	Amanecer	The Unknown University	
This is the honest Truth	Esta es la pura verdad	The Unknown University	
Work	El Trabajo	The Unknown University	
The Wigs of Barcelona	Las pelucas de Barcelona	The Unknown University	
My Castles	Mis Castillos	The Unknown University	
Chinese Poet in Barcelona	Poeta Chino en Barcelona	The Unknown University	
My Poetry	Mi poesia	The Unknown University	
Fucking Whistler	Pendejo Whistler	The Unknown University	
Dickensian Children	Niños de Dickens	The Unknown University	

=== Interviews with Bolaño ===
Name	Interviewer	Original publication	Collected in
Literature Is Not Made from Words Alone	Héctor Soto and Matias Bravo	Capital Santiago, December 1999	Roberto Bolaño: The Last Interview & Other Conversations
Reading Is Always More Important than Writing	Carmen Boullosa	Bomb Magazine #78, Winter 2002	Roberto Bolaño: The Last Interview & Other Conversations
Positions Are Positions and Sex Is Sex	Eliseo Álvarez	Revista Cultural Turia 75, June 2005 (as "Roberto Bolaño: Todo escritor que escribe en español deberia tener influencia cervantina"	Roberto Bolaño: The Last Interview & Other Conversations
The Last Interview / The End: Distant Star	Monica Maristain	Playboy Mexico, July 2003	Roberto Bolaño: The Last Interview & Other Conversations; Between Parentheses

== Works about Bolaño ==
=== Articles ===
Name	Writer	Original publication	Collected in	Available online
Roberto Bolaño: Portrait of the Writer as Noble Savage	Will H. Corral	World Literature Today, November - December 2006	-	-
Vagabonds - Roberto Bolaño and his fractured masterpiece	Daniel Zalewski	The New Yorker, 26 March 2007	-	The New Yorker
Precarious Crossing: Immigration, Neoliberalism, and the Atlantic	Alexandra Perisic	Ohio State University Press, 2019. 89-120. Print.	"How to Get Away with Murder: Multinational Corporations and Atlantic Crimes". Chapter 3 on Roberto Bolaño's novel 2666)"	
The Great Bolaño	Francisco Goldman	The New York Review of Books, 19 July 2007	-	-
In the Sonora	Benjamin Kunkel	London Review of Books, 6 September 2007	-	London Review of Books
Alone Among the Ghosts	Marcela Valdes	The Nation, 8 December 2008	Introduction to Roberto Bolaño: The Last Interview & Other Conversations	The Nation
Roberto Bolaño’s Flower War: Memory, Melancholy, and Pierre Menard.	Ignacio López-Calvo	Roberto Bolaño, a Less Distant Star: Critical Essays., Ed. Ignacio López-Calvo. Palgrave Macmillan Publishing, 2015. 35-64. Print	-	-

=== Books ===
Title	Author	Publisher
Roberto Bolaño's Fiction: An Expanding Universe	Chris Andrews	Columbia University Press (July 29, 2014)
Bolaño: A Biography	Monica Maristain	Melville House (August 26, 2014)
Roberto Bolaño, a Less Distant Star: Critical Essays.	Ignacio López-Calvo	Palgrave Macmillan Publishing (March 25, 2015)
Framing Roberto Bolaño: Poetry, Fiction, Literary History, Politics	Jonathan Beck Monroe	Cambridge University Press (November 7, 2019)
