= The Third Reich (novel) =

2010 novel by Roberto Bolaño

- First edition (Spanish)
- Author: Roberto Bolaño
- Original title: El Tercer Reich
- Translator: Natasha Wimmer
- Language: Spanish
- Publisher: Anagrama (Spanish); Farrar, Straus and Giroux (English)
- Publication date: 1989
- Publication place: Spain
- English publication date: 2011
- Media type: Print
- Pages: 360
- ISBN: 8433972057

The Third Reich (El Tercer Reich in Spanish) is a novel by the Chilean author Roberto Bolaño written in 1989. It was discovered among his papers following his death and published in Spanish in 2010. An English translation by Natasha Wimmer was published in November 2011.

The book belongs to both the "Hispanic Narratives" collection and the "Compact" series, from the same publisher; its title is another name sometimes used for Nazi Germany. The subject of Nazism is frequent in the author's bibliography, who had extensive historical knowledge about it. He had previously dedicated novels related to this subject, such as Nazi Literature in the Americas and Distant Star.

== Creation of the novel ==
The novel was initially written by hand in several notebooks, around the time of The Ice Rink, the last of which is dated 1989. He later typed it into 362 pages, on which he made corrections by hand. Bolaño bought his first computer in 1995, and before his death he had already digitized the first 60 pages of the work, from which it can be inferred that he had at some point thought of publishing it.

In the development of the work, war games or wargames, which Bolaño was fond of, are of special importance, and most of the events take place at the Del Mar hotel, which is also previously mentioned in his novel The Ice Rink, whose events also take place during the summer and in a tourist town on the Costa Brava, nicknamed there simply as Z.

== Plot ==
The novel concerns Udo Berger, a German wargame champion, who returns with his girlfriend Ingeborg to the small town on the Costa Brava where he spent the summers of his childhood. When one of his friends disappears Udo invites a mysterious local to play a game of Rise and Decline of the Third Reich, a classic wargame published by Avalon Hill.

== Serialized publication ==
By special arrangement with the Bolaño estate, the Paris Review published the complete novel in four installments over the course of a year with illustrations by Leanne Shapton. The first installment appeared in the 2011 spring issue and the second in the 2011 summer issue. This was the first serialized novel published in the magazine since Harry Mathews’s The Sinking of the Odradek Stadium, forty years earlier.

== Critical reception ==
The introduction to the first installment published in the Paris Review sees the novel as a precursor to Bolaño's later works:

From the first sentence, The Third Reich bears his hallmarks. The irony, the atmosphere of erotic anxiety, the dream logic shading into nightmare, the feckless, unreliable narrator: all prefigure his later work. The young novelist must have been exhilarated, and possibly alarmed, to discover his talent so fully formed.

Michael Schaub, reviewing the novel for NPR, stated that it was "compassionate, disturbing and deeply felt...in Udo Berger, Bolaño has created someone complex, sometimes frustrating and absolutely unforgettable." Giles Harvey meanwhile, writing for The New Yorker, found the novel to be "moody and uneven" and claimed it "should join that shelf marked 'For Completists Only,' on which also sit Antwerp, Monsieur Pain, The Romantic Dogs, Between Parentheses, and The Skating Rink."

== Film adaptation ==
A thriller adaptation called Summer War has been announced, directed by Chilean director Alicia Scherson. The film will be a co-production of Araucaria Cine in Chile, Le Tiro in Argentina, and Nadador Cine in Uruguay. Lux Pascal, sister of actor Pedro Pascal, has been announced for the cast.
