= The Unknown University =

Book by Roberto Bolaño

- 2013 New Directions cover
- Author: Roberto Bolaño
- Original title: La Universidad Desconocida
- Translator: Laura Healy
- Language: Spanish
- Genre: Poetry
- Publisher: Editorial Anagrama (Spanish, 2007); New Directions (English/Spanish bilingual, 2013)
- Publication place: Spain
- Pages: 835
- ISBN: 978-0-8112-1928-0
- OCLC: 812781269
- Dewey Decimal: 861/.64
- LC Class: PQ8098.12.O38 A2 2013

The Unknown University is a posthumous anthology of poems by the Chilean writer Roberto Bolaño. It was first published in Spain as La Universidad Desconocida by Editorial Anagrama in 2007. A bilingual edition with English translation by Laura Healy was published by New Directions in 2013.

Several poems in the collection were originally published in English in The Believer, Boston Review, Conduit, McSweeney's, The New Yorker, The Paris Review, Pleiades, Poetry, A Public Space, and The Threepenny Review.

== History ==
Most of the roughly 300 poems in the collection were written between 1978 and 1984, with a few dating as late as 1993.

According to Bolaño's widow, Carolina López, the earliest version of the book was a 57-page manuscript found among Bolaño's papers titled The Unknown University, poems 1978-1981, seemingly assembled in 1984 or earlier. Another manuscript with the same title had 138 pages and was prepared sometime after 1985. A third and final manuscript was titled The Unknown University, definitive version (almost) 1993. This was the basis for the version published by Anagrama.

A version of The Unknown University's "People Walking Away" was published in 2002 (in Spanish) and 2010 (in English) as Antwerp, translated by Natasha Wimmer; Healy adapted Wimmer's translation for the book. An earlier version of the text titled "Fragments of the Unknown University" won the 1992 Rafael Morales Prize from the government of Talavera de la Reina, Spain, Morales' hometown.

The book takes its title from one of its poems, "Between Friedrich von Hausen":

(Dear Alfred Bester, at least
I've found one of the wings
of the Unknown University!)

"The Men Who Murdered Mohammed," a 1958 story by American science fiction writer Alfred Bester, told the story of a mad scientist named Henry Hassel, a "professor of Applied Compulsion at Unknown University...Nobody knows where the Unknown University is or what they teach there. It has a faculty of some two hundred eccentrics and a student body of two thousand misfits—the kind that remain anonymous until they win Nobel Prizes or become the first man on Mars."

== Reception ==
In The New York Times, Dwight Garner noted that most of the poems were written in Bolaño's 20s — "and very often they read like juvenilia — the unrhymed free verse of a man who was equal parts poet and poet manqué, a word-drunk literary drifter still finding his voice...Many are vignettes, full of play, written almost like journal entries...The sound The Unknown University mostly makes is that of a promising young writer seeking his way in the world of words."

In the Los Angeles Times, Hector Tobar wrote that The Unknown University 'reads like a series of fragments from a diary of [Bolaño's] epic artistic journey...it's a book that illuminates the personal struggle behind one of the great literary careers of our times, a career that has come to define a global literary aesthetic."

Salon reviewer J.P. Smith found the collection thematically similar to Bolaño's novels and "not unexpectedly of uneven quality, especially when it comes to the more youthful efforts."

In World Literature Today, Andrew Martino called it "some of Bolaño’s earliest and grittiest writing. The book is classified as poems, but this may be misleading, as I’m not sure we should really read these as poems at all. Of course, there are poems here, and more than a fair share of prose poems. Most of the work here is unpolished and raw, and thrilling.

Jonathan Beck Monroe, in his book Framing Roberto Bolaño: Poetry, Fiction, Literary History, Politics, wrote that The Unknown University "represents at least the belated possibility, previously unrealized during his lifetime, that Bolaño, an author best known as a novelist, may at last garner some greater measure of recognition as a poet, not only as a writer fully invested in poetry who wrote autobiographically inflected novels in which so many of the protagonists, as well other characters, are poets and/or poet-critics, and in which poetry is central, but also as an author who himself wrote poetry."

The Unknown University was shortlisted for the 2014 Best Translated Book Award.
