= Benno von Archimboldi =

Fictional character

Benno von Archimboldi is a fictional character in the novel 2666 (2004) by Roberto Bolaño.

Archimboldi is the pen name of German author Hans Reiter (born in 1920 and still alive in 2001). He is introduced in the first part of the novel, "The Part About the Critics", as a mysterious and elusive figure: while he is highly regarded as a novelist, nothing is known about his biography, appearance, or true identity. After learning that Archimboldi has recently been sighted in Mexico, three literary critics, Jean-Claude Pelletier, Manuel Espinoza, and Liz Norton, travel to Santa Teresa (a fictional counterpart to real-life Ciudad Juárez) in pursuit of his trail. While they are unsuccessful, they learn that his real name is Hans Reiter. Few details are given about Archimboldi's appearance in this part of the novel, but it is revealed that he is very tall and has blue eyes.

From then on, Archimboldi effectively disappears from 2666 until he resurfaces in the last part of the novel ("The Part About Archimboldi"), which tells the künstlerroman-like story of his childhood in Germany, his experiences fighting in World War II, his relationship with his wife, Ingeborg, and his development as a writer. The novel concludes as he leaves for Mexico, at the behest of his sister, in order to assist his imprisoned nephew, Klaus Haas.

== Biography ==
The fictional Archimboldi was born in Prussia in 1920 as Hans Reiter. His father was a one-legged soldier who fought in World War I, and his mother was "one-eyed" (blind in one eye). He was preoccupied with seaweed and diving as a child. For a long time, the only book he read and carried was Animals and Plants of the European Coastal Region. He considered the birth of his younger sister, Lotte, when he was ten, to be the "best thing that had ever happened to him."

After leaving school at 13, Reiter eventually went to work as a servant in the country house of the Baron von Zumpe, where his mother was also employed. There he befriended Hugo Halder, the baron's nephew, who introduced him to the wider world of literature through the works of Wolfram von Eschenbach. At the house, Reiter also encountered for the first time the baron's daughter, the future Baroness von Zumpe (later known as Mrs. Bubis). After the baron closed the house, Reiter left to work in Berlin.

Although he never joined the Nazi party, Reiter was nonetheless drafted into the German army in 1939. He spent most of the war fighting on the Eastern Front. He was eventually captured and placed in an Allied POW camp, where he murdered a German official named Sammer, who was responsible for the shooting deaths of multiple Jews.

Reiter's literary career, for which he was to become famous, began in Cologne, Germany, where he settled after the war. To avoid being connected with Sammer's murder he adopted the pseudonym "Benno von Archimboldi", modeled after Italian painter Giuseppe Arcimboldo. This painter came to Reiter's attention through his reading the notebooks of a Ukrainian man in whose house he had wintered during the German offensive into Russia.

Archimboldi's long-time publisher was Jacob Bubis, who was nearly alone in recognizing Archimboldi's talent. After Bubis died, the reins of his publishing house were turned over to his wife, Mrs. Bubis (the former Baroness von Zumpe), with whom Archimboldi had a lifelong, occasionally amorous, friendship.

== Works ==
In 2666, the following works are listed in chronological order of their publication:

- Lüdicke
- The Endless Rose (attributed to "a frenchman named J. M. G. Arcimboldi" in an earlier novel by Bolaño, The Savage Detectives (1998))
- The Leather Mask (part of a trilogy with D'Arsonval and The Garden)
- Rivers of Europe
- Bifurcaria Bifurcata (a book about seaweed)
- Inheritance
- Saint Thomas
- The Blind Woman
- The Black Sea (a play)
- Lethaea (described as an erotic novel)
- The Lottery Man
- The Father
- The Return

The following works were presumably written after The Return, but in uncertain order:

- D'Arsonval
- The Garden
- Mitzi's Treasure
- Railroad Perfection
- The Berlin Underworld (a collection of mostly war stories)
- Bitzius (a novel about the Swiss novelist Jeremias Gotthelf)
- The King of the Forest (published around 2001)
- The Head (his latest novel as of the present in "The Part About the Critics")

== Analysis ==
Chris Andrews, the Spanish-to-English translator of Distant Star, Nazi Literature in the Americas, By Night in Chile, and Amulet, has argued that Bolaño's protagonists are often aimless. In a review of Andrews' Roberto Bolaño’s Fiction: An Expanding Universe for Los Angeles Review of Books, John Yargo describes Archimboldi’s "meandering path" as being reflected in the life of his nephew.

Writing for the Institute for Human Sciences, Biliana Kourtasheva described Archimboldi as hovering over the novel like a "deus absconditus".
