= Alcira Soust Scaffo =

Uruguayan teacher and poet

- Born: 4 March 1924; Durazno Department, Uruguay
- Died: 30 June 1997 (aged 73); Montevideo, Uruguay
- Other names: Mima Soust
- Occupations: Teacher, writer

Alcira Soust Scaffo (4 March 1924 – 30 June 1997) was an Uruguayan teacher and poet who lived in Mexico for more than two decades. During the occupation of the National Autonomous University of Mexico (UNAM) by the Mexican Army in 1968, she remained hidden for 15 days in a bathroom at the university. This episode became a notable anecdote in the Mexican Movement of 1968, and was also included in Roberto Bolaño's novels.

== Biography ==
Alcira Soust Scaffo was the youngest of three sisters in a middle-class family. From an early age she excelled academically, managing to become a schoolteacher at 20. She obtained an interim assistantship at Escuela Granja No. 43 in Chileno Grande, on the north coast of the Río Negro.

In the 1960s she settled in Mexico. She received a scholarship from the Center for Regional Cooperation for Adult Education in Latin America and the Caribbean (Centro de Cooperación Regional para la Educación de Adultos en América Latina y el Caribe; CREFAL) to attend the training course for Fundamental Education Specialists in Pátzcuaro, Michoacán. This was attended by three other compatriots, including Miguel Soler, who would lead CREFAL years later.

At CREFAL, Soust worked with indigenous and peasant communities. At the conclusion of the course she wrote an essay on the importance of recreation entitled "Recreation in the structure of personality", which would be the first thesis published by CREFAL. After the course, Soust got an extension of the scholarship to study muralism with Rufino Tamayo.

In 1960 she married a doctor, from whom she separated in 1962.

== 1968 incident at UNAM ==
In 1968, Alcira Soust resided and worked on the UNAM campus. In the absence of a stable job, she lived on small tasks that were given by some professors of the Faculty of Philosophy and Letters (mainly translations of French), with the help of her friends, and through the drawings and poems that she delivered at will or simply gave away.

She had connected with the poets of the Mexico City scene, where she became friends with José Revueltas. Soust is the basis for the character of Auxilio Lacouture from the novel The Savage Detectives, in which Roberto Bolaño recreated the literary environment of that time. In this work, and later in Amulet, Soust's resistance is reconstructed literarily during the invasion of UNAM by the Mexican Army.

The university campus was invaded and occupied by the army on 18 September 1968. Some witnesses maintain that Soust helped students to escape and put verses of León Felipe on the loudspeakers as a peaceful protest. The fear of being imprisoned led her to hide in a bathroom in the Humanities Tower, where she remained for the 15 days that the occupation lasted.

This fact transformed her into a legend of the student movement, which came to consider her the Uruguayan that "resisted" the military occupation.

== Return to Uruguay in 1988 ==
Soust returned to Uruguay in 1988. She arrived in Montevideo in a fragile state of health, with a letter to her family detailing her delicate psychological situation. At first, she maintained contact with her relatives, who supported her financially on many occasions. Eventually, she completely lost the link, despite a search by her family, which failed to reestablish contact.

Alcira Soust died on 30 June 1997 at age 74, due to a respiratory infection, at the Hospital de Clínicas in Montevideo.
