= Àlex Rigola =

Spanish theatre director (born 1969)

Àlex Rigola (born in Barcelona, 28 November 1969) is a Spanish theatre director. He has directed the Teatre Lliure in Barcelona since March 2003 as well as the theatre section of the Venice Biennale. He holds a directing degree from the Escola Superior d'Art Dramàtic (Institut del Teatre) of Barcelona.

He has directed and adapted:

- Cat on a Hot Tin Roof, by Tennessee Williams (2010)
- Frost-Nixon, by Peter Morgan (2009)
- Better Days, by Richard Dresser (2009), in the Teatro de La Abadía (Madrid, Spain)
- El buñuelo de Hamlet, by Luis Buñuel y Àlex Rigola (2008)
- Rock'n roll, by Tom Stoppard (2008)
- 2666, by Roberto Bolaño (2007)
- Long Day's Journey into Night, by Eugene O'Neill (2005)
- Arbusht, by Paco Zarzoso (2006)
- European House, by Alex Rigola (2005)
- Richard III, by William Shakespeare (2005)
- Saint Joan of the Stockyards, by Bertolt Brecht (2004)
- Glengarry Glen Ross, by David Mamet (2003)
- Julius Caesar, by William Shakespeare(2003)
- Ubu Roi, by Alfred Jarry (2002), in the Teatro by La Abadía
- Woyzeck, by Georg Büchner (2001)
- Suzuki I i II, by Alexei Xipenko (2001)
- The Goldberg Variations, by George Tabori (2000)
- Titus Andronicus by William Shakespeare (2000)
- Bellow the Belt, by Richard Dresser (2000)
- The Water Engine, by David Mamet (1999)
- The Trojan Women, by Euripides (1998)
- Kafka: El Procés, by Franz Kafka (1997)
- Camí by Wolokolamsk (I), by Heiner Müller (1996)

He was assistant director to Joan Ollé on:

- Roberto Zucco, by Bernard-Marie Koltès
- Por los pueblos, by Peter Handke
- Así que pasen cinco años, by Federico García Lorca

He also directed El cancionero by palacio (2003) and Cançons d'amor i droga (2003) with various texts by Pepe Sales sung by Albert Pla and Judith Farrés. His first production in the Gran Teatre del Liceu in Barcelona was the Richard Wagner opera The Flying Dutchman (2007).
