= The Return (short story collection) =

2010 short story collection by Roberto Bolaño

- First edition
- Author: Roberto Bolaño
- Translator: Chris Andrews
- Language: Spanish
- Genre: Short story collection
- Publisher: New Directions
- Publication place: United States
- English publication date: 2010
- Media type: Print (paperback)
- Pages: 200
- ISBN: 0-8112-1715-9

The Return is a collection of short stories by the Chilean author Roberto Bolaño, published in English in 2010, translated by Chris Andrews. This volume contains all the stories from Bolaño's two Spanish language collections, Llamadas Telefonicas (1997), and Putas Asesinas (2001), which have not been previously included in the 2006 collection Last Evenings on Earth.

== The stories ==
- "Snow" – The son of a Chilean Communist family recalls his time as procuror for a Russian mobster.
- "Another Russian Tale" - an Andalusian soldier in World War II is captured by Russians
- "William Burns" – a man from Ventura, California looks after two women who are convinced they are being stalked by a killer.
- "Detectives" - Describes the physical deterioration of Belano, a character from The Savage Detectives.
- "Cell Mates" - the relationship between the narrator and a woman he met in prison, Sofia, a Communist
- "Clara" - the story of the life of a woman whom the narrator fell in love with as a teenager
- "Joanna Sivestri" - A porn star reunites with an old lover.
- "Prefiguration of Lalo Cura" – a Colombian man remembering his childhood with his mother, who was a porn actress. A character named Lalo Cura also appears in 2666.
- "Murdering Whores" - A woman ties up and murders a man after having sex with him. The story is told in the form of a stream of consciousness narration.
- "The Return" – A dead man's consciousness returns to earth, only to find that his body has been rented out to a necrophiliac. Giles Harvey named this story, along with the title story of Last Evenings on Earth, as "the greatest things Bolaño ever wrote".
- "Buba" - A new member on a Spanish football team seems to perform witchcraft to improve the team's performance
- "Photos" - The narrator pages through a book of francophone poets, vividly imagining them and their lives while walking through an abandoned village somewhere in Africa
- "Meeting with Enrique Lihn" - Bolaño recounts a dream about meeting the dead poet Enrique Lihn

=== "Meeting with Enrique Lihn" ===
The narrator (Roberto Bolaño) recalls a dream about meeting the dead poet Enrique Lihn; a previous correspondence with him included a discussion of Chile's "six tigers of Chilean poetry" (including Bolaño himself) though by the time of their meeting none of the poets had achieved much, excluding Rodrigo Lira, who had committed suicide. In spite of their past correspondence Lihn does not acknowledge knowing the narrator when they are introduced, and the narrator also pretends that they are not acquainted. Later on Lihn suddenly realizes that he is dead, and the narrator leaves him. Out on the street he runs into someone he doesn't know who confuses him with someone else, and Bolaño plays along. The man soon realizes his mistake, but then proceeds to play along himself, pretending that he knows Bolaño. Both are aware of the game, and Bolaño constructs a whole story regarding the man, whom he calls Jara, and his supposed life. Bolaño returns to Lihn and they go to his surreal apartment, which seems to have a glass floor and constantly changes in structure and appearance. They eventually return to the bar where Lihn tells him that "The tigers are finished, and, It was sweet while it lasted, and, You’re not going to believe this, Bolaño, but in this neighborhood only the dead go out for a walk."

== Reception ==
Mina Holland gave the collection a positive review for The Guardian, praising its lively, compelling storytelling. Darryl Whetter praised The Return for The Globe and Mail, particularly "The Prefiguration of Lalo Cura", but found some of the stories to be weak, particularly the first and last.
