= Lilian Serpas =

Lilian Serpas Gutiérrez
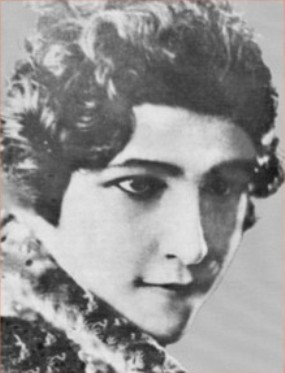
- Born: 1905; El Salvador
- Died: 1985 (aged 79–80); El Salvador
- Occupation: Poet
- Spouse: Thomas Jefferson Coffeen Suhl
- Children: 3

Lilian Serpas Gutiérrez (1905–1985) was a Salvadoran poet. It has been said "information on her is scarce and contradictory", but that she may have had a sexual relationship with Che Guevara. She appeared on a postage stamp of El Salvador and in Roberto Bolaño's novel Amulet. She is also mentioned in Bolaño's novel The Savage Detectives.

== Early life ==
Serpas was born into a family closely connected to literary and cultural life in El Salvador. Her father, Carlos Serpas, was a Salvadoran writer whose influence on her intellectual environment was significant despite his death when she was still very young. Following his passing, her mother, Josefa de los Ángeles Gutiérrez, assumed responsibility for her upbringing and education. Serpas grew up in a household where literature and the arts were actively cultivated.

== Literary career and contributions ==
Serpas began writing poetry during childhood. One of her earliest poetic manuscripts, composed in 1915, was later revised and published under the title Nácar in 1929. Her first formally printed book, Urna de ensueños, appeared in 1927 with an introductory text by Juan Ramón Uriarte. These early publications established her presence within Salvadoran literary circles and marked the beginning of her professional career.

During the 1920s, Serpas gained recognition for a lyrical style characterised by emotional intensity and formal experimentation. Her work from this period placed her among a generation of poets exploring introspective and symbolic themes within Salvadoran literature.

She worked as a contributor to the magazine Pareceres and for the radio station A.Q.M.. She also spent a period in the United States, living in San Francisco from 1930 to 1938, where she collaborated with the magazine Sequoia of Stanford University.

After returning to El Salvador, she devoted herself fully to working for El Diario de Hoy, primarily in the section Pajaritas de Papel (1941). She published several major poetry collections in the postwar period, including Huésped de eternidad (1947) and La flauta de los pétalos (1951), both of which were noted for their thematic maturity and stylistic refinement.

A major personal tragedy occurred in 1970 with the death of her son, Fernando, during the Vietnam War. This event had a profound impact on her personal life and emotional well-being and is often cited as a turning point in her later years. Despite these difficulties, Serpas continued to write.

That same year, she published Girofonía de las estrellas, a work frequently regarded as one of her most significant contributions to Salvadoran poetry. The collection is generally interpreted as a late-career synthesis of her poetic concerns, marked by themes of loss, transcendence, and introspection.

== Personal life ==
During the 1930s, she married the American painter Thomas Jefferson Coffeen Suhl (1910–1985), with whom she had three children: Carlos, Fernando David, and Reginaldo.

== Books ==
- Urna de ensueños [Urn of Dreams] (in Spanish). Impr. J. Cisneros. 1927. p. 86.
- Huésped de la eternidad, 1928-1948, [Guest of Eternity, 1928–1948] (in Spanish). El Castillo de Viento. 1949. p. 167.
- La flauta de los pétalos [The Flute of the Petals] (in Spanish). El Castillo de Viento. 1951. p. 100.
- Hacia un punto del origen [Toward a Point of Origin] (in Spanish). 1959.
- Girofonía de las estrellas [Girophony of the Stars] (in Spanish). B. Costa-Amic. 1970. p. 62.
- Proyección a la nada [Projection into Nothingness] (in Spanish). B. Costan-Amic. 1971. p. 70.
- Isla de trinos [Island of Trills] (in Spanish). Ministerio de Educación, Dirección de Publicaciones. 1980. p. 94.
- Meridiano de Orquídeas y Niebla [Meridian of Orchids and Mist] (in Spanish). MINED. 1982. p. 100.
