= Woes of the True Policeman =

2011 posthumous novel by Roberto Bolaño

- First edition (Spanish)
- Author: Roberto Bolaño
- Original title: Los sinsabores del verdadero policía
- Translator: Natasha Wimmer
- Language: Spanish
- Publisher: Editorial Anagrama, Barcelona
- Publication date: 2011
- Publication place: Spain
- English publication date: November 13, 2012 (US)
- Media type: Print (hardback and paperback)
- Pages: 256

Woes of the True Policeman (Los sinsabores del verdadero policía in Spanish) is a novel written by Chilean author Roberto Bolaño and published posthumously. The novel was first released in Spanish in 2011. Larry Rohter in his review of the English translation in The New York Times said, "The novel offers readers plot lines and characters that supplement or propose variations on Mr. Bolaño’s 900-page magnum opus, 2666". An English-language translation by Natasha Wimmer was published in the US on November 13, 2012, by Farrar, Straus and Giroux. An editorial note appended to the book by Bolaño’s widow describes it as “a project that was begun in the 1980s and continued to be a work in progress up until the year 2003 [...] this edition was undertaken with the unwavering intent to respect Bolaño’s work and the firm pledge to offer the reader the novel as it had been found in his files.”

== Sections ==
The sections of the novel found on Bolaño's computer were organized into four numbered folders each with a title and page count:

1. Amalfitano and Padilla, 165 pages
2. Rosa Amalfitano, 39 pages
3. Pancho Monje, 26 pages
4. J.M.G. Archimboldi, 38 pages.

Another folder titled "Cowboy Graveyard" contained 8 more chapters. In the published novel the material was arranged into five sections:

=== I. The Fall of the Berlin Wall ===
To avoid a scandal involving his homosexual relationships with the poet Padilla and others, Óscar Amalfitano is forced to resign from the University of Barcelona and moves with his daughter Rosa to Santa Teresa, Mexico. While the general outline is similar to Amalfitano's story in 2666, there are major differences including his being a widower (in 2666 his wife had run off), his alienation from his daughter, and his homosexual tendencies.

=== II. Amalfitano and Padilla ===
Amalfitano settles in Santa Teresa, meets the painter Castillo, and exchanges letters with Padilla.

=== III. Rosa Amalfitano ===
Rosa's new life in Santa Teresa.

=== IV. J.M.G. Archimboldi ===
A review of Archimboldi's life and works, including a bibliography, summaries of 7 novels, and short chapters on his friendships, epistolary relationships, hobbies, and enemies. There are significant differences between this character and 2666's Benno von Archimboldi, not the least of which are their different nationalities (French and German, respectively).

=== V. Killers of Sonora ===
Mostly focused on Pancho Monje who joins the Santa Teresa police force and is asked to tail Amalfitano, and a continuation of Padilla's letters to Amalfitano. Pancho Monje's family history is nearly identical to that of 2666's Lalo Cura.
