= Monsieur Pain =

Novel by Roberto Bolaño

First edition, with original title (publ. City Council of Toledo)

Monsieur Pain is a short novel by Chilean author Roberto Bolaño (1953–2003). Written in 1981-1982, it was originally published in 1993 under the title La senda de los elefantes (lit. "The Path of the Elephants") by the City Council of Toledo, Spain, as the winning story of its "Félix Urabayen Prize". The book was reprinted in 1999 under its final Spanish title, Monsieur Pain. A translation from the Spanish by Chris Andrews was published by New Directions in January 2010.

This book was the second novel Bolaño wrote (following Antwerp, written in 1980, published in 2002) but the first one published, excluding his collaboration with A. G. Porta, Consejos de un discípulo de Morrison a un fanático de Joyce, which was published in 1983.

== Summary ==
The novel is set in Paris and narrated by the Mesmerist Pierre Pain. In April 1938 Pain is approached by Madame Reynaud, whose late husband he had failed to help, to assist the Peruvian poet César Vallejo who is in the hospital, afflicted with an undiagnosed illness and unable to stop hiccuping. Pain's attempts to reach and treat Vallejo are thwarted by skeptical doctors and two mysterious Spanish men who bribe him not to treat Vallejo. Though he accepts the bribe, Pain attempts to treat the poet but is barred from the hospital and loses contact with Madame Reynaud. He has several run-ins with friends, strangers, and old acquaintances, and finds himself lost in the hospital and later in a warehouse, chasing strangers through the rain, and watching ambiguous events unfold, but he is unable to make sense of any of these events. The novel ends with an "epilogue for voices" which offers brief biographical reminiscences, or perhaps obituaries, of the novel's main characters, but it still fails to offer a resolution to the mystery.

== Criticism ==
In a 2010 review for the New York Times Will Blythe states:

The beauty of Roberto Bolaño’s slender mystery novel Monsieur Pain, originally published in 1999 and now translated from the Spanish by the estimable Chris Andrews, is that it doesn’t behave much like a mystery novel. By the end of the book, which Bolaño wrote in either 1981 or 1982, the mysteries remain unsolved, the ostensible victim may or may not have suffered from foul play and the protagonist intent on figuring out who done it (if anyone did anything at all) appears incapable of doing so.

Ursula K. Le Guin wrote for The Guardian that "this early Bolaño novel has a moral and political urgency that obliges me to accept its noir banalities. Its tortuous method of approaching the unspeakable reveals the face of evil without glamorising it, as popular literature and film so often do. By indirection it avoids collusion."

== Translations ==
An English translation of Monsieur Pain by Chris Andrews was published by New Directions in January 2010. The book has also been translated into French by Robert Amutio (Serpent à plumes, 2008), Persian by Milad Zakaria (Ofoq Publications, 2012) and Japanese by Kenji Matsumoto (Hakusuisha, 2017).
