= Concha Urquiza =

Mexican poet

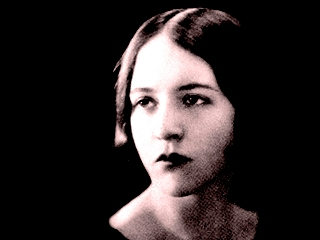
- Born: María Concepción Urquiza del Valle; 24 December 1910; Morelia, Michoacan, Mexico
- Died: 20 June 1945 (aged 34); Ensenada, Baja California, Mexico
- Occupations: Poet, professor
- Writing career
- Period: 20th century

Concha Urquiza (born María Concepción Urquiza del Valle; 24 December 1910 - 20 June 1945) was a Mexican poet considered by intellectuals as the best woman poet of Mexican literature after Sor Juana Inés de la Cruz and by Rosario Castellanos as the "cornerstone" of the female poetic movement in Mexico. She was a fervent Catholic, skeptical and communist thinker.

== Life ==
Two years after being born in Morelia, Michoacán, her father Luis Urquiza died, so along with her mother also named Concepción and her two siblings María Luisa and Luis, she moved to Mexico City. As a child, she attended the official primary school that was located on the Plaza de Dinamarca. Later she completed her secondary education at the school located in the Ribera de San Cosme, in a building formerly occupied by the Colegio del Sagrado Corazón. In the city, under the auspices of the poet Muñoz y Domínguez, she wrote her first poem titled "Para tu amada" ("For your beloved").

When she was 12, she published the poems "Tus ojeras" ("The rings under your eyes") and at 13 "Canto del Oro" and "Conventual" in the magazines Revista de Yucatán and Revista de Revistas. Critics admired the creations of Urquiza, who sporadically published several poems in more than 10 literary magazines. Although she was in direct contact with the best stridentist and avant-garde Mexican poets of the time, such as Arqueles Vela, she was not influenced by Vela's work and kept in her poetry "the most classical standards of meter and rhyme".

At 16, Urquiza collaborated for the Revista de Revistas asking the following question: "What do you think of the new generation?" in interviews with Rafael López, Mariano Azuela, Xavier Villaurrutia, Victoriano Salado Álvarez and Federico Gamboa. The question was accompanied by a small introduction in connection with each of these authors, for example, in the case of Mariano Azuela, Uquiza said "The author of Evil Hour ...".

She lived in New York City from 1928 to 1933. She militated in the Communist party until in 1937 she had a spiritual crisis that turned her into Catholicism, breaking with her political affiliation. She entered the aspirancy of the Daughters of the Holy Spirit, but could not stand the life at the convent, and abandoned the order to teach logic and history of philosophical doctrines at the Autonomous University of San Luis Potosí. That period is considered the most fruitful of the poet who, halfway between the bohemian and religious life, rejected all imposture or flaunting typical in intellectual circles.

Together with her friend Rosario Oyarzun, who was a lawyer, Urquiza was part of a group of young professionals and Potosinian university students who would later have a career: Raúl Cardiel Reyes, Ignacio Retes, Pedro Rodríguez Zertuche, Humberto Arocha, Manuel Calvillo, Antonio Rosillo. Jesús Medina Romero and Joaquín Antonio Peñalosa also attended the meetings held, almost always, at Oyarzun's house and, if not, in the cafe Zaragoza.

She wrote in 1944 in Viñetas de la literatura michoacana, a monthly literary magazine from Morelia, where she shared credits with Porfirio Martínez, Alejandro Ruiz Villaloz, Alfonso Rubio y Rubio, Miguel Castro Ruiz, Luis Calderón Vega, P. Francisco Alday, Miguel Bernal Jiménez, Alejandro Avilés, Roberto Ibáñez, Jacques Leguèbe, Eduardo de Ontañon, Manuel Ponce, Artemio de Valle Arizpe and Joaquín Antonio Peñalosa.

Urquiza was one of the Mexican writers who, like Josefina Vicens, also ventured into cinema. She was only 16 years old when she competed under the pseudonym "Santiago Damián", in the contest created by Revista de Revistas with "Moby Dick. Novela cinematográfica" ("Moby Dick. Cinematographic novel"). According to Luis Mario Schneider, this award-winning text "is a very personal version of Melville". Another project in which the author was involved is the film adaptation of the novel Heart by Edmondo De Amicis. In January 1939, she delivered the document on which the brothers Alejandro Galindo and Marco Aurelio Galindo relied to make the screenplay, allowing filming to start two months later. The result was Corazon de Niño (1939), with Domingo Soler in the leading role.

Urquiza drowned in the sea at Ensenada, Baja California, at age 35, on June 20, 1945, along with a fellow traveler.

== Work ==
As Margarita León's research indicates, thanks to philologist Gabriel Méndez Plancarte the corpus of his friend Concha Urquiza's poetic work was not released until 1946, after her death, by the Mexican publishing house Bajo el Signo de Ábside, with the title Obras ("Works"). Various reissues of the book approved by Méndez Plancarte were prepared, among the most important, that of Antonio Castro Leal by the publishing house Jus in 1975 and Ricardo Garibay in 1985 under the title Nostalgia de Dios ("Nostalgia of God").

== In popular culture ==
"Cesárea Tinajero", the lost poetess character from the novel The Savage Detectives by Roberto Bolaño was based on Concha Urquiza.
