= Last Evenings on Earth =

1997 short story collection by Roberto Bolaño

- First edition (Spanish)
- Author: Roberto Bolaño
- Translator: Chris Andrews
- Language: Spanish
- Genre: Short story collection
- Publisher: Anagrama (Spanish); New Directions (English)
- Publication place: Spain
- English publication date: 2006
- Media type: Print (paperback)
- ISBN: 978-0-8112-1634-0
- OCLC: 64098367
- Dewey Decimal: 863/.64 22
- LC Class: PQ8098.12.O38 A2 2006

Last Evenings on Earth (Llamadas Telefonicas in Spanish) is a collection of short stories by the Chilean author Roberto Bolaño, published in 1997 with a translation into English by Chris Andrews published in 2006. The stories in this volume were selected from two Spanish-language collections, Llamadas Telefonicas (1997) and Putas Asesinas (2001). The remaining stories in these two collections were later gathered in The Return.

== Summary ==
Set amid the diaspora of Chilean exiles in Latin America and Europe, the fourteen stories in Last Evenings on Earth are peopled by Bolaño's beloved "failed generation" and demonstrate the complexities of Latin American identity and history. The narrators are usually writers grappling with private (and often unlucky) quests, speaking in the first person as if giving a deposition—like witnesses to a crime. These protagonists tend to take detours and narrate unresolved efforts. They are characters living at the margins. Other stories find themselves narrated in the third person by the author "B.", which is one of many cases of Bolaño writing himself into his own fiction.

== The Stories ==
=== "Sensini" ===
The unnamed narrator comes in fourth in a short story contest. In the collection of finalists, he reads a story by Luis Antonio Sensini. He begins a correspondence with the much-older writer. When Sensini moves back to Argentina, the two stop writing each other. After Sensini dies, his daughter Miranda visits the narrator.

=== "A Literary Adventure" ===
The author B writes a book which includes a mocking portrayal of another, and far more famous, author – A. To B's surprise, A writes a positive review of B's book, and B is left to wonder the possible implications of this. After a second book by B receives a long, considered and insightful review by A, B decides that he has to meet him.

=== "The Grub" ===
Seventeen-year-old Arturo Belano spends his days in Mexico City browsing bookstores and watching movies. He strikes up an odd friendship with a man, whom he calls "the grub" ("El Gusano"), who sits on the same bench every day, doing nothing. The character of the grub, "with his straw hat and a Bali cigarette hanging from his bottom lip", is also the subject of Bolaño's poem of the same name ("El Gusano" in Spanish, though translated as "the Worm" rather than "the Grub" in Laura Healy's translation of The Romantic Dogs).

=== "Gómez Palacio" ===
A 23-year-old poet becomes a creative writing teacher in the town of Gómez Palacio and goes on a strange car-ride with the director of the writing program.

=== "Last Evenings On Earth" ===
A Chilean father and his son vacation in Acapulco and visit a whorehouse bar, where they get into a fight. Giles Harvey named this story, along with the title story of The Return, as "the greatest things Bolaño ever wrote".

=== "Dance Card" ===
The narrator returns from Mexico to Chile in 1973 "to help build socialism;" he is arrested during a road check and imprisoned for being a "Mexican terrorist" but released a few days later thanks to a pair of former classmates who had become police detectives.

== Literary significance and reception ==
Francine Prose, reviewing the collection in The New York Times, wrote of Bolaño, "Reading Roberto Bolaño is like hearing the secret story, being shown the fabric of the particular, watching the tracks of art and life merge at the horizon and linger there like a dream from which we awake inspired to look more attentively at the world."

In The Guardian, novelist Ben Richards wrote "Bolano is both aware of and indulgent towards the futility of poetic rebellion, which is why so many of his characters carry a sense of doom with them. But he also succeeds in injecting his lost and wandering poets with nobility and pathos."Garth Risk Hallberg, author of City on Fire, recommended it as the best introduction to Bolano's work, writing "A story like 'Gomez Palacio,' in which, simultaneously, nothing much happens and everything does, presents a vision as idiosyncratic, and as existentially important, as Kafka’s. Each writer seems to have sprung fully formed from the void."
