= Tres (poetry collection) =

- First edition (Spanish)
- Author: Roberto Bolaño
- Translator: Laura Healy
- Language: Spanish
- Genre: Poetry collection
- Publisher: Acantilado (Spanish); New Directions (English)
- Publication date: 2000
- Publication place: Spain
- English publication date: 2011
- Media type: Print (Paperback)
- Pages: 105
- ISBN: 8495359308

Tres is a collection of poems by the Chilean author Roberto Bolaño, originally published in Spanish in 2000 and scheduled to be published in a bilingual edition in September 2011, translated into English by Laura Healy. The collection is composed of three sections:

- “Prose from Autumn in Gerona” - a series of film songs in prose that slowly reveals a subtle and emotional story about unrequited love.
- “The Neochileans” - a travel narrative in verse concerned with a young band on tour in the far reaches of Chile. It's a kind of "On the Road" in lyrics.
- “A Stroll Through Literature” - a series of short poems. This poems reminds us of Bolaño's great ability to walk the line between the seriously comic and the comically serious.

A selection of 16 poems from the book was published in BOMB Magazine in March 2011.
