= A. G. Porta =

Spanish novelist

Antoni García Porta
- Born: 1954 (age 71–72); Barcelona, Catalonia, Spain
- Occupation: Novelist
- Writing career
- Language: Spanish

Antoni García "A. G." Porta (born 1954) is a Spanish novelist.

Porta was born in Barcelona in 1954. His first published work a collaboration with Roberto Bolaño entitled Advice from a Morrison Disciple to a Joyce Fanatic (Consejos de un discípulo de Morrison a un fanático de Joyce) in 1984. It won the Premio Ámbito Literario. This was also Bolaño's first published novel. Their collaboration would produce one more work before Porta abandoned literature for fifteen years to work a variety of jobs. In 1999, he published Braudel on Braudel (Braudel por Braudel), marking his work's return to publication. This was followed by The Weight of the Air (El peso del aire) in 2001 and Singapore (Singapur) in 2003.

In 2006, Porta published The No World Concerto (Concierto del No Mundo) which had won the Premio Café Gijón in 2005. In 2008 he published Geography of Time (Geographía del tiempo).

A fictionalized version of Porta appears in Bolaño's posthumously published work Woes of the True Policeman.

== Works ==
In Spanish

- Braudel por Braudel, Acantilado, 1999
- El peso del aire, Acantilado, 2001
- Singapur, Acantilado, 2003
- Concierto del No Mundo, Acantilado, 2006
- Geografía del tiempo, Acantilado, 2008

Collaborations with Bolaño

- Consejos de un discípulo de Morrison a un fanático de Joyce (Anthropos, 1984), novel
- Diario de bar, short story

(Published together in a single volume by Acantilado in 2006)

In English

- The No World Concerto, Dalkey Archive, 2013 (trans. Darren Koolman, Rhett McNeil)
