= Letters to a Young Novelist =

Non-fiction book by Mario Vargas Llosa

- Cover of 1997 first edition
- Author: Mario Vargas Llosa
- Original title: Cartas a un joven novelista
- Translator: Natasha Wimmer
- Language: Spanish
- Genre: Literary criticism (writing manual)
- Publication date: 1997
- Pages: 136

Letters to a Young Novelist (Spanish: Cartas a un joven novelista) is a non-fiction book by the Nobel Prize-winning Peruvian author Mario Vargas Llosa, published in 1997. An English translation by Natasha Wimmer was published in 2001. In 2011, the book was listed by The Guardian among the 100 best non-fiction books.

Following in the footsteps of Rainer Maria Rilke's Letters to a Young Poet, Vargas Llosa in Letters to a Young Novelist discusses important tools and techniques of writing in eleven essays, in some cases using a classic text as an example, using letters as an organizational principle. However, unlike in Rilke's book, the "young novelist" of the title is generally understood to be a conceit; there is no intended recipient other than the reader.

== Contents ==
The eleven essays (and postscript) of the book are titled as follows:

- The Parable of the Tapeworm
- The Catoblepas
- The Power of Persuasion
- Style
- The Narrator and Narrative Space
- Time
- Levels of Reality
- Shifts and Qualitative Leaps
- Chinese Boxes
- The Hidden Fact
- Communicating Vessels
- By Way of a P.S.
