= The Skating Rink =

1993 novel by Roberto Bolaño

- First edition (Spanish)
- Author: Roberto Bolaño
- Original title: La Pista de Hielo
- Translator: Chris Andrews
- Language: Spanish
- Publisher: Alcala de Henares (Spanish); New Directions (English)
- Publication date: 1993
- Publication place: Spain
- English publication date: 2009
- Media type: Print (Cloth)
- Pages: 198
- ISBN: 8487153526

The Skating Rink (La Pista de Hielo in Spanish) is a novel by the Chilean author Roberto Bolaño. A translation from the Spanish by Chris Andrews was published by New Directions in August, 2009.

David Sawer adapted it as an opera by the same name, first performed in July 2018.

== Summary ==
Set in the seaside town of Z, on the Costa Brava, north of Barcelona, The Skating Rink is told by three male narrators (one Mexican, one Chilean, and one Spaniard), revolving around a beautiful figure-skating champion, Nuria Martí. When she is suddenly dropped from the Olympic team, a pompous but besotted civil servant secretly builds a skating rink in a local ruin of a mansion, using public funds. But Nuria has affairs, provokes jealousy, and the skating rink becomes a crime scene.

== Critical reception ==
Philip Hensher, writing for The Guardian, remarked on the experience of reading Bolaño's first novel, in translation, after English readerships have already read the later works of 2666 and The Savage Detectives: "It has conspicuous, classical flaws in technique and is undeniably frustrating on its own terms. The interesting thing is that many of those flaws are exactly the things which Bolaño expanded, developed, and turned into virtues of the highest originality."

Similarly, Wyatt Mason, for The New York Times, wrote that the English readership could expect a deluge of Bolaño translations after the success of 2666: "In the apparently inexhaustible posthumous career of the Chilean writer Roberto Bolaño, a significant second act will soon be upon us, leaving some readers to clap excitedly while others throw up their hands in submission: the large number of books by Bolaño already available is soon to double." Of the novella itself, Mason said that, much like his other works, "The imperative to present the sources of such emotion remains a central feature in Bolaño’s expanding shelf of astonishing fictions, the wellsprings of incomprehensible feeling that hide in even the most abject fool."

Michael Eaude, writing for The Independent, said that the novella was "A strange book and nearly as good as Bolaño's two masterpieces."

Kevin Canfield, in SFGate, said: "Bolaño's Rashomonesque novel is narrated by three very different men living in a fictional shoreline town near Barcelona ... As in any good crime story, there is a fair amount of foreshadowing (the outline of a knife visible through some clothing, the increasing mental instability of one important character). But as he's done before in his popular literary sleuth stories, Bolaño upends the formula, advancing the story in increments that fit together like damaged puzzle pieces."
