= The Insufferable Gaucho =

2003 short story collection by Roberto Bolaño

- First edition (Spanish)
- Author: Roberto Bolaño
- Original title: El Gaucho Insufrible
- Translator: Chris Andrews
- Language: Spanish
- Genre: Short story collection
- Publisher: Anagrama (Spanish); New Directions (English)
- Publication date: 2003
- Publication place: Spain
- English publication date: 2010
- Media type: Print (paperback)
- Pages: 177
- ISBN: 8433968505

The Insufferable Gaucho (El Gaucho Insufrible, 2003) is a collection of five short stories and two essays by the Chilean author Roberto Bolaño (1953–2003). It was published in English in 2010, translated by Chris Andrews. During his lifetime, Bolaño made his name as a writer of short stories, and The Insufferable Gaucho collects a disparate variety of work. From its comical title story to the Kafkaesque "Police Rat", the book's wide spectrum of storytelling techniques "makes an ideal introduction to the Bolaño imaginaire." The year after its publication, Bolaño was posthumously awarded in Chile for this work with the Altazor Prize in the "Narrative" category.

== Contents ==
- "Jim" – A short tale about a troubled Vietnam veteran living as a poet in Mexico.
- "The Insufferable Gaucho" – The title story of the collection is inspired by the Jorge Luis Borges story "The South," which is mentioned in the story. The esteemed lawyer Héctor Pereda leaves Buenos Aires for a simpler life at a remote ranch on the pampas, and later returns to the city a changed man. (Its strange pampa "rabbits" are not fantasy but refer to the Patagonian mara.)
- "Police Rat" – the story of Pepe the rat, a relative of Kafka's "Josephine the singer," who describes his life as a police rat in the sewers.
- "Alvaro Rousselot’s Journey" – The story of an Argentine writer who travels to France in search of a director who’s been filming his books without giving the author credit or royalties.
- "Two Catholic Tales" – "The Vocation" is about a young man waiting for his calling, and "Chance" deals with a lunatic who escapes from an asylum.
- "Literature + Illness = Illness" – an essay, originally a lecture about illness, sex, Mallarmé's "Brise Marine" ("Sea Breeze") and Baudelaire's "The Voyage".
- "The Myths of Cthulhu" – an essay, originally a lecture about writers, writing, and the state of Latin American literature. (The title is a reference to H.P. Lovecraft's Cthulhu Mythos.)
