= The Spirit of Science Fiction =

Novel by Roberto Bolaño

- First edition (Spanish)
- Author: Roberto Bolaño
- Original title: El espíritu de la ciencia-ficción
- Translator: Natasha Wimmer
- Language: Spanish
- Publisher: Editorial Anagrama, Barcelona
- Publication date: 2016 (written ca. 1984)
- Publication place: Spain
- English publication date: February 5, 2019 (US)
- Media type: Print (hardback and paperback)
- Pages: 209

The Spirit of Science Fiction (Spanish: El espíritu de la ciencia-ficción) is a novel written by Chilean author Roberto Bolaño around 1984 and published posthumously. It was published in Spanish in 2016; an English-language translation by Natasha Wimmer was published in 2018 by Picador and in February 2019 by Penguin.

Although unpublished at his death, The Spirit of Science Fiction was one of Bolaño's first completed novels, the manuscript bearing the inscription "Blanes, 1984", and reviewers saw it as a precursor to The Savage Detectives.

The novel was officially launched on November 30, 2016, within the framework of the International Book Fair in Guadalajara, Mexico, which that year was dedicated to Latin America.

== Plot ==
The novel is set in Mexico City in the 1970s; the central characters are two young Chilean would-be writers who have emigrated during the Pinochet dictatorship, 17-year-old Jan Schrella and 21-year-old Remo, and Remo's friend José Arco. Jan, a science fiction author and Bolaño's alter ego, sits in the attic they share and writes, much of the time letters to authors he idolizes. Remo, a poet, falls in love with a girl he meets at a poetry workshop, and with Arco, also a poet, quests on the latter's motorbike after Dr. Carvajal, who can explain the simultaneous rise of illiteracy and proliferation of poetry journals in the city. In addition to Jan's letters the story is intercut with dreams and with flashforwards to Remo's life after he is successful; Remo also narrates the last section of the novel, "Mexican Manifesto", a love story that was published on its own in The New Yorker in 2013.
