= The Way to Paradise =

2003 novel by Mario Vargas Llosa

- 1st edition
- Author: Mario Vargas Llosa
- Original title: El paraíso en la otra esquina
- Translator: Natasha Wimmer
- Cover artist: Paul Gauguin
- Language: Spanish
- Genre: Historical novel
- Publisher: Faber and Faber (Eng. trans.)
- Publication date: 2003
- Publication place: United States
- English publication date: 2004
- Media type: Print (Paperback)
- ISBN: 978-0-571-22039-7
- OCLC: 61263831

The Way to Paradise (Spanish: El paraíso en la otra esquina) is a novel published by Mario Vargas Llosa in 2003.

This is a fictional double biography of Post-Impressionist painter Paul Gauguin and his grandmother Flora Tristan, one of the founders of feminism. The book is divided into 22 chapters, each alternating narratives of Flora Tristan and Paul Gauguin, the grandson she never knew, because he was born after she died. Flora Tristan, illegitimate daughter of a wealthy Peruvian man and a French woman, is repelled by sex, detests her husband, and abandons him and fights for women's and workers' rights. The story of Paul Gauguin unfolds along a comparable quest for an ideal life. Gauguin abandons his wife and children, and his job as a stockbroker in Paris, to pursue his passion for painting. He distances himself from European civilization, moving to Tahiti and French Polynesia for inspiration. The contrasts and similarities between two lives attempting to break free from conventional society are developed.

== Translations ==
Originally written in Spanish, the book was translated into English by Natasha Wimmer and published by Faber and Faber in 2004 under the title The Way to Paradise, although a more literal translation would be The Paradise in the Other Corner. A French translation by Albert Bensoussan was printed under the title Le Paradis, un peu plus loin. The book has also been translated into German by Elke Wehr as Das Paradies ist anderswo, and into Bulgarian as Рая зад другия ъгъл.

== Awards and honors ==
The New York Times listed The Way to Paradise as a Notable Book of the Year. In 2010, Vargas Llosa won the Nobel Prize in Literature.

== See also ==
- William Somerset Maugham's 1919 novel The Moon and Sixpence is also based on the life of Paul Gauguin.
