= Cowboy Graves =

2017 short story collection by Roberto Bolaño

- First edition (Alfaguara, 2017)
- Author: Roberto Bolaño
- Original title: Sepulcros de vaqueros
- Translator: Natasha Wimmer
- Language: Spanish
- Genre: Novella collection
- Publisher: Alfaguara
- Publication date: 14 September 2017
- Publication place: Spain
- English publication date: 16 February 2021
- Media type: Print (softback)
- Pages: 216
- ISBN: 978-84-204-2743-0
- OCLC: 1005080401
- Dewey Decimal: 863
- LC Class: PQ8098.12.O38 A6 2017
- Preceded by: The Spirit of Science Fiction

Cowboy Graves: Three Novellas (Spanish: Sepulcros de vaqueros) is a collection of three short works by the Chilean writer Roberto Bolaño. It was posthumously published by Alfaguara in September 2017. An English translation by Natasha Wimmer was published by Penguin Press on 16 February 2021. The book collects three short pieces, Cowboy Graves, French Comedy of Horrors, and Fatherland. It is accompanied by an afterword by Juan Antonio Masoliver Ródenas as well as a note on the text by Bolaño's widow, Carolina López Hernández.

== Summaries ==
=== Cowboy Graves ===
Cowboy Graves follows Arturo Belano, a teenager and aspiring poet and the alter ego of Bolaño. It begins with Arturo, his mother, and his younger sister waiting for a plane ride to Mexico after they are prevented from getting on the flight. While waiting for the next flight at his mother's friend's house, he reminisces about his mother, their housekeeper Celestina, and his mostly absent Mexican father. Once in Mexico Arturo spends most of his time browsing bookstores and watching movies, but spends his mornings with a man he calls "the Grub", who originated from Sonora, the state of Arturo's grandfather. Arturo cares for the man when he becomes ill and learns about his hometown, after which the Grub gives Arturo a bone-handled knife and disappears.

After being expelled from high school Arturo spends some time working in Sonora before returning to Mexico City, where he announces to his family that he will return to Chile to join the revolution. On the ship to Valparaiso Arturo befriends a cabaret star, Dora Montes, who is travelling with her sister and whom he also finds in bed with his cabinmate, Johnny Paredes. He also describes an unfinished sci-fi story to a Spanish Jesuit and overhears two men in the adjoining room discuss a murder that one had committed. Arturo has sex with Dora twice, the second time with Johnny accompanying.

Once in Santiago, Arturo joins up with a group of the Chilean left after hearing of a military coup. He refuses to volunteer for an espionage mission, as he is unfamiliar with the city. The cell's leader, Pancho, orders the group to guard the streets and respond back with a set of responses to his password, which Arturo forgets. When Pancho later approaches him to gain information, Arturo is unable to give the required response and instead tells him directly that there has been no movement on the street for hours.

=== French Comedy of Horrors ===
In Port Hope, French Guiana, a group of friends of Roger Bolamba, a former athlete and now local literary figure, gathers at the House of the Sun during a solar eclipse. Parting ways with the group at the end of the evening, the narrator, seventeen-year-old Diodorus Pilon, takes a shortcut home to the Coves. Walking down Elm Street, he hears the ringing of a public telephone in a booth across the street, and on the tenth ring, he answers it. He enters into a conversation with an unnamed member of the Clandestine Surrealist Group or CSG. The member explains that the group uses public telephones to select new members. Then, the member tells the story of Andre Breton inviting five young surrealists to spend ten years in the sewers of Paris.

These men become the nucleus of the CSG. The men are given keys to allow them to venture out of the sewers. The group is well-financed, and the group sets out to discover the source of their financing. They install a movie camera in the sewers, which shows that each month, a different woman delivers an envelope of money. The men discover that each is the widow of a famous surrealist. Diodorus's interlocutor provides him with instructions to meet a man on Rue de la Rénunion in Paris, on a certain day and at a certain time, who will ask Diodorus how to get to La Promenade de Vénus, a Parisian café. The phone conversation ends soon after, and Diodorus walks the rest of the way to the Coves. There, he meets a man, woman and child whom he recognizes from the night before as dancing at the House of the Sun during the eclipse. He is told by the child that the man and woman have gone blind.

=== Fatherland ===
Fatherland consists of 20 sections. One section is only a few sentences long, most are one or two pages long, and each is titled but not numbered as chapters.

== Development ==
The works form part of the Bolaño Archive, maintained at the author's home. According to Lopéz Hernández, in the archive, the first two works exist in both print and electronic form, the third in print form only. In her note, Lopéz Hernández concludes that Cowboy Graves was composed between 1995 and 1998, French Comedy of Horrors between 2002 and 2003, and Fatherland between 1993 and 1995.

== Publication ==
The book was first announced in July 2017. It was first published by Alfaguara in September 2017 (in Spain) and in January 2018 (in Mexico). Cowboy Graves was first published in English on 16 February 2021 through Penguin Press, where it was translated by Natasha Wimmer.

== Reception ==
Cowboy Graves garnered a positive reception upon release, with a reviewer for the Chicago Review of Books noting that the work offers "a look at writing itself as afforded through these incomplete and transfixing works". Writing in the New York Times, Garth Risk Hallberg praised the collection and described the first novella in the collection, "Cowboy Graves", as a "gem". The Guardian's Rob Doyle was also positive, describing the collection as "a minor chamber in the labyrinth of Bolaño's fiction, but it's one with many doors".
