= Natasha Wimmer =

American translator (born 1973)

Natasha Wimmer (born 1973) is an American translator best known for her translations of Chilean novelist Roberto Bolaño's 2666 and The Savage Detectives from Spanish into English.

== Biography ==
Natasha Wimmer grew up in Iowa. She learned Spanish in Spain, where she spent four years growing up. She studied Spanish literature at Harvard University.

She lives in Brooklyn, New York, with her husband and children.

== Career ==
Her first job after graduating was at Farrar, Straus & Giroux from 1996 to 1999 as an assistant and then managing editor. While working there, Wimmer produced her first translation, the Dirty Havana Trilogy by Cuban novelist Pedro Juan Gutiérrez.

Wimmer then worked at Publishers Weekly, before leaving to work on Roberto Bolaño's books full-time. On her work in publishing and translation, Wimmer has said: "I had decided in college that I would never be a fiction writer, but I knew I wanted to be as close to books as I could. Publishing was one way, and translating turned out to be a better way for me."

She has also translated Nobel Prize-winning author Mario Vargas Llosa's The Language of Passion, The Way to Paradise, and Letters to a Young Novelist; and Marcos Giralt Torrente's Father and Son, among other works.

Wimmer has written for publications such as The Nation, The New York Times, and The Believer. She teaches translation at Princeton University.

== Awards ==
Wimmer received a National Endowment for the Arts Translation Grant in 2007 and the PEN Translation Prize in 2009. She won the National Book Critics Circle Award for Fiction in 2008 for her translation of 2666 and an Award in Literature from the American Academy of Arts and Letters in 2010.

Spanish writer Gabriela Ybarra's The Dinner Guest, in Wimmer's translation, was nominated for the 2018 International Booker Prize.

== Translations ==
=== Of Roberto Bolaño ===
- 2666
- The Savage Detectives (Los detectives salvajes)
- The Third Reich (El Tercer Reich)
- A Little Lumpen Novelita (Una novelita lumpen)
- Antwerp (Amberes)
- The Spirit of Science Fiction (El espíritu de la ciencia-ficción)
- Woes of the True Policeman (Los sinsabores del verdadero policía)
- Cowboy Graves: Three Novellas (Sepulcros de vaqueros)
- Between Parentheses: Essays, Articles, and Speeches, 1998-2003
- The Secret of Evil (El Secreto del Mal)

=== Of Álvaro Enrigue ===
- You Dreamed of Empires (Tu sueño imperios han sido)
- Sudden Death (Muerte súbita)
- Now I Surrender to You and That Is All (Ahora me rindo y eso es todo)

=== Of Nona Fernández ===
- Space Invaders
- Voyager: Constellations of Memory
- The Twilight Zone (La dimensión desconocida)

=== Of Mario Vargas Llosa ===
- The Way to Paradise (El paraíso en la otra esquina)
- Letters to a Young Novelist (Cartas a un joven novelista)
- The Language of Passion

=== Of Gabriel Zaid ===
- The Secret of Fame (El secreto de la fama)
- So Many Books (Los demasiados libros)

=== Of other authors ===
- Kensington Gardens (Jardines de Kensington) by Rodrigo Fresán
- Father and Son: A Lifetime by Marcos Giralt Torrente
- Dirty Havana Trilogy (Trilogía sucia de La Habana) by Pedro Juan Gutiérrez
- Delirium (Delirio) by Laura Restrepo
- The Dinner Guest (El comensal) by Gabriela Ybarra
