= By Night in Chile =

2000 novella by Roberto Bolaño

- First edition (Spain)
- Author: Roberto Bolaño
- Original title: Nocturno de Chile
- Translator: Chris Andrews
- Cover artist: Michael Sowa, The Sailors
- Language: Spanish
- Publisher: Anagrama (Spanish); New Directions (English)
- Publication date: 2000
- Publication place: Spain
- English publication date: 2003
- Media type: print
- ISBN: 8433924648

By Night in Chile (Spanish: Nocturno de Chile) is a novella by Chilean author Roberto Bolaño, first published in 2000. It was the first of Bolaño's novels to be published in English, with Chris Andrews's English translation, which appeared in 2003 under New Directions.

Originally titled Storms of Shit (Spanish: Tormentas de mierda), friend Juan Villoro and Jorje Herralde, his editor, convinced him to change it. In the author's own words he says "By Night in Chile is a metaphor of a hellish country, among other things. It's also a metaphor of a young country, a country that doesn't know whether it's a country or a countryside."

== Plot ==
The story is narrated entirely in the first person by the sick and aging Father Urrutia. Taking place over the course of a single evening, the book is the monologue of a flawed man and a failed priest. Except for the final sentence, the book is written without paragraphs or line breaks. The story ranges from Opus Dei to falconry to private lessons on Marxism for Pinochet and his generals directed at the unspecified reproaches of "the wizened youth", with the narrator taking on a persistently hallucinatory and defensive tone.

The story begins with the lines "I am dying now, but I still have many things to say", and proceeds to describe, after a brief mention of joining the priesthood, how Father Urrutia entered the Chilean literary world under the wing of a famous, albeit fictitious, tacitly homosexual literary critic by the name of Farewell. At Farewell's estate he encounters the critic's close friend Pablo Neruda and later begins to publish literary criticism and poetry.

Not surprisingly, Urrutia's criticism (written under a pen-name) is met with more applause than his poetry and there is little if any mention of Urrutia attending to matters of the church until two individuals from a shipping company (likely undercover government operatives) send him on a trip through Europe, where he meets priest after priest engaged in falconry.

The story frequently openly discusses politics, especially within Chile, the Chilean Catholic Church, and Opus Dei. Urrutia is chosen to teach Augusto Pinochet and his top generals about Marxism after the coup and death of President Allende. Urrutia's political views are conflicting with those of Bolaño, who was well known for his radical left-wing politics.

It is speculated that the "wizened youth" who Urrutia repeatedly lashes at and defends himself from, may be a metaphor for Roberto Bolaño's own political and personal beliefs. It is also implied it serves as a younger Urrutia who has not compromised himself as the current narrator himself has, suggesting that Urrutia has understood since his first words to the reader that he is compromised. By the end of the story, Urrutia seems to be making a last apology directed to himself, understanding that the reason by which he has led his life is flawed.

== Critical reception ==
Susan Sontag declared that "By Night in Chile is the real thing, and the rarest: a contemporary novel destined to have a permanent place in world literature." James Wood from The New York Times said By Night in Chile was "still his greatest work."

Ben Richards, writing in The Guardian, said "this is a wonderful and beautifully written book by a writer who has an enviable control over every beat, every change of tempo, every image. The prose is constantly exciting and challenging—at times lyrical and allusive, at others filled with a biting wit (Bolaño has dissected the Chilean literary tradition with such gleeful eloquence that the novel may not win him many dinner invitations back in the country of his birth)." The novella, a satire, marks the beginning of its author's criticism of artists who retreat into art, using aestheticism as a way of blocking out the harsh realities of existence. Richards continues, "Bolaño uses this to illustrate the supine nature of the Chilean literary establishment under the dictatorship."

The Millions wrote "Bolaño’s novella is a psychological portrait of complicity, and the ways in which we rationalize our complicity."

Unlike other deathbed rants, such as William Gaddis's Agapē Agape, the writing style was regarded accessible and the story of his life intact as it is woven into Chile's political history, despite the progressively more delirious and compromised powers of recollection by the narrator. Francisco Goldman describes it as "sublime lunacy, Goya darkness, poignant wizardly writing—the elegantly streaming consciousness of Bolaño's dying literary priest merges one Chilean's personal memories with Chilean literature and history, and ends up confronting us with devastating questions that anyone, anywhere, might, should, be asking of themselves 'right now'" and O'Bryen acknowledges a heavy layer of melancholia throughout the work.
