= The Secret of Evil =

2007 short story and essay collection by Roberto Bolaño

- First edition
- Author: Roberto Bolaño
- Original title: El Secreto del Mal
- Translator: Chris Andrews
- Cover artist: Max Beckmann, Self Portrait with Champagne Glass, 1919
- Language: Spanish
- Publisher: Anagrama (Spanish); New Directions (English)
- Publication date: 2007
- Publication place: Spain
- English publication date: 2012
- Media type: Print (paperback)
- Pages: 182
- ISBN: 8433971433

The Secret of Evil (El Secreto del Mal, 2007) is a collection of short stories and recollections or essays by the Chilean author Roberto Bolaño (1953–2003). The English translation by Chris Andrews was published by New Directions in 2012. The Spanish version was published posthumously and contains 21 pieces, 19 of which appear in the English edition. Several of the stories in the collection feature characters that have appeared in previous works by Bolaño, including his alter ego Arturo Belano and characters that first appeared in Nazi Literature in the Americas.

Some pieces are autobiographical or semi-autobiographical recollections, like "I Can't Read" or "Death of Ulises". Two pieces are essays or speeches previously published in Between Parentheses: "Vagrancies of the Literature of Doom", and "Sevilla Kills Me" (as well as the piece "Beach", then-considered an essay, now reprinted here as fiction).

== Contents ==
- Colonia Lindavista (La Colonia Lindavista)
- The Secret of Evil (El Secreto del Mal)
- The Old Man of the Mountain (El Viejo de la Montaña)
- The Colonel's Son (El Hijo del Coronel)
- Scholars of Sodom (Sabios de Sodoma)
- The Room Next Door(La Habitación de al Lado)
- Labyrinth (Laberinto)
- Vagaries of the Literature of Doom (Derivas de la Pesada) - an essay
- Crimes (Crímenes)
- I Can't Read (No Sé Leer)
- Beach (Playa) - a story composed of a single long sentence, whose opening words are, "I gave up heroin and went back to my town and started on the methadone treatment administered me at the clinic..." This story was claimed to be autobiographical and led people to believe that Bolaño had a heroin habit. this was later refuted by Bolaño's widow as well as his American agent Andrew Wylie.
- Muscles (Músculos)
- The Tour (La Gira)
- Daniela (Daniela)
- Suntan (Bronceado)
- Death of Ulises (Muerte de Ulises)
- The trouble-maker (El Provocador)
- Sevilla Kills Me (Sevilla me Mata) - an essay
- The Days of Chaos (Las Jornadas del Caos)
