= Amulet (novel) =

1999 novel by Roberto Bolaño

- First edition (Spanish)
- Author: Roberto Bolaño
- Original title: Amuleto
- Translator: Chris Andrews
- Language: Spanish
- Publisher: Anagrama
- Publication date: 1999
- Publication place: Spain
- English publication date: 2006
- Media type: Print (Paperback)
- Pages: 154
- ISBN: 8433910973

Amulet (Spanish: Amuleto) is a short novel by the Chilean author Roberto Bolaño (1953–2003). It was published in 1999. An English translation, by Chris Andrews, was published by New Directions in 2006.

The book is dedicated to the author's poet friend Mario Santiago Papasquiaro (1953–1998), who died the year it was being written; as "Ulises Lima", Santiago was prominently featured in The Savage Detectives and gets a cameo in this story.

The novel is contextualized at the time of the 1968 Movement in Mexico, specifically in the army invasion of the Ciudad Universitaria, on 18 September 1968, which preceded the Tlatelolco massacre of 2 October of the same year occurred at the end of the government of Mexican President Gustavo Díaz Ordaz.

== Plot summary ==
Amulet embodies in one woman's voice the melancholy and violent history of Latin America. It begins: "This is going to be a horror story. A story of murder, detection and horror. But it won't appear to be, for the simple reason that I am the teller. Told by me, it won't seem like that. Although, in fact, it's the story of a terrible crime."

The speaker is named Auxilio Lacouture,(her name means 'help' on Spanish),^{[source?]} dubbed "the mother of Mexican poetry", though her own take is, "I could say I am the mother of all Mexican poets, but I better not". Tall, thin, blonde, and old enough to actually be the mother of some of the poets, she's a Uruguayan exile living illegally in Mexico City since the 1960s, lending a maternal hand to those in need (even her forename means "Help" in Spanish), doing odd jobs for old writers and at the Faculty of Philosophy and Literature.

She becomes famous as the sole person who symbolically resists the army's 1968 invasion of the National Autonomous University of Mexico (UNAM) two weeks before the now infamous Tlatelolco massacre (2 October) – she hides in a fourth-floor lavatory cubicle "for thirteen days" from 18 to 30 September.

As she tries to outlast the occupiers and grows ever hungrier, Auxilio recalls her life, her lost teeth, her beloved friends and poets, and she soon moves on to strange landscapes: ice-bound mountains, seedy bars in "the dark night of the soul of Mexico City", a terrifying chasm, and a bathroom where moonlight shines, moving slowly from tile to tile.

Her recollections mostly drift from 1965 (when she arrived in Mexico) to 1976 (when Belano left Mexico), but end on an eponymous vision of the victims: "And although the song that I heard was about war, about the heroic deeds of a whole generation of Latin Americans led to sacrifice, I knew that above and beyond all, it was about courage and mirrors, desire and pleasure. And that song is our amulet."

== Connections with other Bolaño novels ==
Auxilio was already featured in a chapter of Bolaño's novel The Savage Detectives (1998), where she narrates her stay in the restroom of the besieged university. However, as Francisco Goldman has noted, Amulet "sings an enthralling and haunting ode to youth, life on the margins, poetry and poets, and Mexico City. Much more than a companion piece to The Savage Detectives – it shares some of the same characters – Amulet may be Bolaño's most autobiographical book. Formally and verbally, it also represents some of his most innovative and thrilling writing."

Amulet features some other characters from The Savage Detectives: mainly the author's alter-ego, Arturo Belano, and his friend Ernesto San Epifanio, but also Laura Jáuregui, Felipe Müller, and Ulises Lima. It also names historical figures, from Che Guevara to mostly writers and artists (like León Felipe, Pedro Garfias, Rubén Bonifaz Nuño, Remedios Varo and Lilian Serpas)

The novel also features Bolaño's only direct reference to the eponymous year of his novel 2666: "Guerrero, at that time of night, is more like a cemetery than an avenue, not a cemetery in 1974 or in 1968, or 1975, but a cemetery in the year 2666, a forgotten cemetery under the eyelid of a corpse or an unborn child."
