= The Romantic Dogs =

Book by Roberto Bolaño

- Original 1994 publication (Spanish)
- Author: Roberto Bolaño
- Translator: Laura Healy
- Language: Spanish
- Genre: Poetry
- Publisher: Fundación Social y Cultural Kutxa (Spanish, 1994); Lumen (Spanish, 2000); New Directions (English, 2008)
- Publication place: Spain
- Media type: Print (Paperback)
- ISBN: 978-0-8112-1801-6
- OCLC: 227016624
- Dewey Decimal: 861/.64 22
- LC Class: PQ8098.12.O38 P4713 2008

The Romantic Dogs (Los perros románticos in Spanish) is a collection of poems by the Chilean author Roberto Bolaño. It was first published in 1994, then expanded in 2000. The bilingual edition, with English translations by Laura Healy, was published by New Directions in 2008.

These 43 poems span nearly twenty years, from 1980 to 1998, embracing a wide variety of topics. Bolaño's obsession with detectives is evident in several poems, but the collection suggests other preoccupations, as in the poem "Godzilla in Mexico."

== The poems ==
- "The Romantic Dogs"
- "Self-Portrait at Twenty Years"
- "Resurrection"
- "In the Reading Room of Hell"
- "Soni"
- "Ernesto Cardenal and I"
- "Day Bleeding Rain"
- "The Worm"

A poem of a man repeatedly described as "a worm with a straw hat / and an assassin's glare". The character is also the subject of Bolaño's short story of the same name ("El Gusano" in Spanish, though translated as "The Grub" in Chris Andrews's translation included in Last Evenings on Earth).

- "Lupe"

A poem of a young prostitute who loses her son; a character of the same name and background appears in The Savage Detectives.

- "The Front Line"
- "La Francesa"
- "The Outsider Ape"
- "Dirty, Poorly Dressed"
- "I Dreamt of Frozen Detectives"
- "The Detectives"
- "The Lost Detectives"
- "The Frozen Detectives"
- "Fragments"
- "The Ghost of Edna Lieberman"
- "Visit to the Convalescent"
- "Godzilla in Mexico"
- "Verses by Juan Ramón"

A poem incorporating verses by Spanish poet Juan Ramón Jiménez from the poem "La carbonerilla quemada".

- "Dino Campana Revises His Biography in Castel Pulci Psychiatric Hospital"
- "Palingenesis"
- "The Nurses"
- "Twilight in Barcelona"
- "The Greek"
- "Mr. Wiltshire"
- "Rain"
- "Luck"
- "X-Rays"
- "The Last Love Song of Pedro J. Lastarria, Alias 'El Chorito'"
- "My Life in the Tubes of Survival"
- "On the Edge of the Cliff"
- "Roadster"
- "The Last Savage"
- "Half-Baked"
- "Atole"
- "The Donkey"
- "Parra's Footsteps"

An homage to Chilean poet Nicanor Parra.

- "I'll Try to Forget"
- "Muse"
- "With the Flies"

== Reception ==
According to Charles Bainbridge, writing for The Guardian:

"The collection is dominated by a series of sustained reminiscences, fuelled by rage and a sense of cornered idealism [...] at key moments the writing pitches a kind of visionary anger. Bolaño seems most at home when describing the sparse Mexican towns near the border with the US [...] and much of the best writing evokes characters, such as "The Worm" or "Lupe", who inhabit this violent world. But the book ends on a very different note with two sudden love poems – lyrical, even gentle – that celebrate the possibility of a kind of salvation"

Sarah Kerr, writing for The New York Review of Books, found the poems to be "wonderfully unreserved" while Boyd Tonkin of The Independent stated that Bolaño "can sound like a Whitman-esque visionary, as in 'The Last Savage', or erotically star-struck, as with 'La Francesa' and her love 'brief as the sigh of a guillotined head', or lyrically touching, recalling teenage hooker 'Lupe' and her lost baby."
