= Antwerp (novel) =

Novella by Roberto Bolaño

- First edition (Spanish)
- Author: Roberto Bolaño
- Original title: Amberes
- Translator: Natasha Wimmer
- Language: Spanish
- Publisher: Anagrama (Spanish); New Directions (English)
- Publication date: 2002
- Publication place: Spain
- English publication date: 2010
- Media type: Print
- Pages: 119
- ISBN: 8433968327

Antwerp (Amberes in Spanish) is a novella by the Chilean author Roberto Bolaño. It was written in 1980 but only published in 2002, a year before the author's death. An English translation by Natasha Wimmer was published in 2010.

The book shows various traces of stories that are intertwined in a confusing way, using an experimental language, more of a poetic narrative than in the rest of his novels. Its title refers to the Belgian city of Antwerp, which only appears in segment 49 of the book.

Considered by Bolaño's literary executor Ignacio Echevarría to be the Big Bang of the Bolaño universe, the loose prose-poem novel was written when Bolaño was 27. Antwerp is short and fragmentary, composed of 56 pieces (which could be seen as vignettes or sketches) with a loose narrative structure. Though there are recurring characters and story lines—including a hunchback who lives in the woods, an English writer, and an 18-year-old girl who runs narcotics and has sex with corrupt policemen—the central narrative is elusive. Readers may deduce that a multiple homicide has taken place (section 5); that the hunchback may have done it, aided by a character named Roberto Bolaño (section 19); that the police are investigating the crime (sections 17, 30, 31, etc.); that these same cops are sleeping with a young girl who is known for owning a motorcycle (section 33, etc.); and that a film is being shown in the woods by the Englishman and/or the hunchback (sections 53, 54, etc.). The timeline in which these events take place and their connection to pieces that seem to be placed outside this narrative (such as section 49, the title piece) remain a mystery to the reader.

Many of the subjects dealt with become Bolaño's common material for his other works of fiction—crimes and campgrounds, drifters and poetry, sex and love, corrupt cops and misfits.

Bolaño had once stated that "The only novel that doesn't embarrass me is Antwerp.". In the introduction he wrote for the book in 2002 Bolaño claimed:

"I wrote this book for myself, and even that I can't be sure of. For a long time these were just loose pages that I reread and maybe tinkered with, convinced I had no time. But time for what? I couldn't say exactly. I wrote this book for the ghosts, who, because they're outside of time, are the only ones with time."
