= 2666 =

2004 novel by Roberto Bolaño

- First edition (Spanish)
- Author: Roberto Bolaño
- Translator: Natasha Wimmer
- Language: Spanish
- Genre: Postmodernism; surrealism; metafiction
- Published: 2004 (Editorial Anagrama, Barcelona); 11 November 2008 (US); 9 January 2009 (UK)
- Publication place: Spain
- Media type: Print (hardback and paperback)
- ISBN: 978-84-339-6867-8 (1st edition in Spanish)
- OCLC: 173260783
- Dewey Decimal: 863/.64 22
- LC Class: PQ8098.12.O38 A122 2004

2666 is the final novel by Chilean writer Roberto Bolaño. It was released posthumously in 2004, a year following his death. It is over 1100 pages long in the original Spanish. It is divided into five parts. An English-language translation by Natasha Wimmer was published in the United States in 2008 by Farrar, Straus and Giroux and in the United Kingdom in 2009 by Picador. It is a fragmentary novel.

== Premise ==
The narrative revolves around an elusive German author and the unsolved and ongoing murders of women in Santa Teresa, a violent city inspired by Ciudad Juárez and female homicides occurring there. In addition to Santa Teresa, settings and themes include the Eastern Front in World War II, the academic world, mental illness, journalism, and the breakdown of relationships and careers. 2666 explores 20th-century degeneration through various characters, locations, periods, and stories within stories. The novel explores rumours and lost identities throughout all five parts.

== Background ==
While Bolaño was writing 2666, he was already sick and on the waiting list for a liver transplant. He had never visited Ciudad Juárez but received information and support from friends and colleagues such as the Mexican journalist Sergio González Rodríguez, author of the 2002 book of essays and journalistic chronicles Huesos en el desierto (Spanish: "Bones in the Desert"), concerning the place and its femicides.

Before his death, Bolaño had discussed the novel with his friend Jorge Herralde (director at Barcelona-based publisher Anagrama), but the sole surviving manuscript was effectively the first draft ever reviewed by another person.

Bolaño originally planned to publish 2666 as a single book. In anticipation of his death, he then intended for it to be published as five volumes, to provide more income for his children; however, the heirs decided otherwise, and the book was published in one lengthy volume. Bolaño had been aware of the book's unfinished status and said a month before his death that over a thousand pages still had to be revised.

== Title ==
The meaning of the title, 2666, is typically elusive; even Bolaño's friends did not know why. Larry Rohter, writing for The New York Times, notes that Bolaño apparently ascribed an apocalyptic quality to the number. Henry Hitchings noted that "the novel's cryptic title is one of its many grim jokes" and maybe a reference to the biblical Exodus from Egypt, supposedly 2,666 years after God created the earth. Some speculate the name to be associated with a future date. In the notes at the end of the first English edition of 2666, Ignacio Echevarría conceptualizes the title as a date which "functions as a vanishing point around which the different parts of the novel fall into place."

While the number does not appear in the book, it does appear in Bolaño's novel Amulet, in which a Mexico City road is described as "a cemetery in the year 2666".

The Savage Detectives contains an approximate reference to the year: "And Cesárea said something about days to come... and the teacher, to change the subject, asked her what times she meant and when they would be. And Cesárea named a date, sometime around the year 2600. Two thousand six hundred and something".

== Plot summary ==
The novel is substantially concerned with violence and death. According to Levi Stahl, it "is another iteration of Bolaño's increasingly baroque, cryptic, and mystical personal vision of the world, revealed obliquely by his recurrent symbols, images, and tropes". Within the novel, "There is something secret, horrible, and cosmic afoot, centered around Santa Teresa (and possibly culminating in the mystical year of the book's title, a date referred to in passing in Amulet). We can at most glimpse it in those uncanny moments when the world seems wrong."

The novel's five parts are linked by varying degrees of concern with unsolved murders of upwards of 300 young, poor, mostly uneducated Mexican women in the fictional border town of Santa Teresa (based on Ciudad Juárez but located in Sonora rather than Chihuahua). The fourth part focuses specifically on the murders.

=== The Part about the Critics ===
This part describes a group of four European literary critics, the French Jean-Claude Pelletier, the Italian Piero Morini, the Spaniard Manuel Espinoza, and the Englishwoman Liz Norton, who have forged their careers around the reclusive German novelist Benno von Archimboldi. Their search for Archimboldi and his life details causes them to get to know his aging publisher, Mrs. Bubis. At a seminar in Toulouse, the four academics meet with Rodolfo Alatorre, a Mexican who says a friend had met Archimboldi in Mexico City a short while back and that from there, the elusive German was said to be going to the Mexican border town of Santa Teresa in Sonora. The academics, except Morini who is in poor health, go to Santa Teresa to search for the author but fail to track him down. A major element of this part centers around romantic entanglements between the critics.

=== The Part about Amalfitano ===
This part concentrates on Óscar Amalfitano, a Chilean professor of philosophy who arrives at the University of Santa Teresa from Barcelona with his young adult daughter Rosa. As a single parent (since her mother Lola abandoned them both when Rosa was two to find her lost poet lover), Amalfitano fears Rosa will become another victim of the femicides plaguing the city. Amalfitano, as he is called through the remainder of this section, is also immersed in the elite society of Santa Teresa, meeting the likes of Dean Guerra and his son, Marco.

=== The Part about Fate ===
This part follows Oscar Fate, an American journalist from New York City who works for an African-American interest magazine in Harlem, New York City. He is sent to Santa Teresa to cover a boxing match despite not being a sports correspondent and knowing very little about boxing. A Mexican journalist, Chucho Flores, who is also covering the fight, tells him about the murders. He asks his editor if he can write an article about the murders but his proposal is rejected. He meets up with a journalist, Guadalupe, who is covering the murders and who promises to get him an interview with one of the main suspects, Klaus Haas, a German who had become a citizen of the United States before moving to Santa Teresa. The day of the fight Chucho presents Oscar to Rosa Amalfitano. After a violent incident they end up at Óscar Amalfitano's house where the father pays Fate to take Rosa with him back to the United States by car, before putting her on a plane to Barcelona. Before leaving, however, Rosa and Fate go to the prison with Guadalupe to interview the infamously tall femicide suspect, Klaus Haas.

=== The Part about the Crimes ===
This part chronicles the murders of 112 women in Santa Teresa from 1993 to 1997 and the lives they lived. It also depicts the police force in their mostly fruitless attempts to solve the crimes, as well as giving clinical descriptions of the circumstances and probable causes of the various homicides. One of the policemen focused on is Juan de Dios Martínez, who is having a relationship with the older Elvira Campo (the director of a sanitarium) and who also has to investigate the case of a man, aptly nicknamed "The Penitent," who keeps urinating and defecating in churches. Klaus Haas (the German femicide suspect Fate was to interview in "the part about Fate") is another of the characters this part focuses on. Haas calls a press conference where he claims that Daniel Uribe, son of a rich local family, is responsible for the murders.

=== The Part about Archimboldi ===
This part reveals that the mysterious writer Archimboldi is really Hans Reiter, born in 1920 in Prussia. This section describes how a provincial German soldier on the Eastern Front became an author in contention for the Nobel Prize. Mrs. Bubis, who was introduced in the first part, turns out to have been Baroness von Zumpe; her family were a major part of Archimboldi's childhood, since his mother cleaned their country home and young Hans spent a lot of time with the Baroness's cousin, Hugo Halder, from whom he learned about the artistic life. Reiter meets the Baroness again during the war while in Romania, and has an affair with her after the war (she is then married to Mr Bubis, the publisher). At the end of this part Bolaño's narrator describes the life of Lotte, Archimboldi's sister, and it is revealed that the femicide suspect Klaus Haas is her son and thus Archimboldi's nephew.

== Reception ==
=== Critical reception ===
2666 was considered the best novel of 2005 within the literary world of both Spain and Latin America. Before the English-language edition was published in 2008, 2666 was praised by Oprah Winfrey in her O, The Oprah Magazine after she was given a copy of the translation before it was officially published. The book was listed in The New York Times Book Review "10 Best Books of 2008" by the paper's editors. with Jonathan Lethem writing:

"2666 is as consummate a performance as any 900-page novel dare hope to be: Bolaño won the race to the finish line in writing what he plainly intended as a master statement. Indeed, he produced not only a supreme capstone to his own vaulting ambition, but a landmark in what's possible for the novel as a form in our increasingly, and terrifyingly, post-national world. The Savage Detectives looks positively hermetic beside it. (...) As in Arcimboldo's paintings, the individual elements of 2666 are easily catalogued, while the composite result, though unmistakable, remains ominously implicit, conveying a power unattainable by more direct strategies. (...) "

Amaia Gabantxo in the Times Literary Supplement wrote:

"(A)n exceptionally exciting literary labyrinth.... What strikes one first about it is the stylistic richness: rich, elegant yet slangy language that is immediately recognizable as Bolaño's own mixture of Chilean, Mexican and European Spanish. Then there is 2666's resistance to categorization. At times it is reminiscent of James Ellroy: gritty and scurrilous. At other moments it seems as though the Alexandria Quartet had been transposed to Mexico and populated by ragged versions of Durrell's characters. There's also a similarity with W. G. Sebald's work.... There are no defining moments in 2666. Mysteries are never resolved. Anecdotes are all there is. Freak or banal events happen simultaneously, inform each other and poignantly keep the wheel turning. There is no logical end to a Bolano book."

Ben Ehrenreich in the Los Angeles Times:

"This is no ordinary whodunit, but it is a murder mystery. Santa Teresa is not just a hell. It's a mirror also—"the sad American mirror of wealth and poverty and constant, useless metamorphosis."... He wrote 2666 in a race against death. His ambitions were appropriately outsized: to make some final reckoning, to take life's measure, to wrestle to the limits of the void. So his reach extends beyond northern Mexico in the 1990s to Weimar Berlin and Stalin's Moscow, to Dracula's castle and the bottom of the sea."

Adam Kirsch in Slate:

"2666 is an epic of whispers and details, full of buried structures and intuitions that seem too evanescent, or too terrible, to put into words. It demands from the reader a kind of abject submission—to its willful strangeness, its insistent grimness, even its occasional tedium—that only the greatest books dare to ask for or deserve."

Francisco Goldman in New York Review of Books:

"The multiple story lines of 2666 are borne along by narrators who seem also to represent various of its literary influences, from European avant-garde to critical theory to pulp fiction, and who converge on the [fictional] city of Santa Teresa as if propelled toward some final unifying epiphany. It seems appropriate that 2666's abrupt end leaves us just short of whatever that epiphany might have been.."

Online book review site The Complete Review gave it an "A+", a rating reserved for a small handful of books, saying:

"Forty years after García Márquez shifted the foundations with One Hundred Years of Solitude, Bolaño has moved them again. 2666 is, simply put, epochal. No question, the first great book of the twenty-first century."

Henry Hitchings in Financial Times:

"2666... is a summative work – a grand recapitulation of the author's main concerns and motifs. As before, Bolaño is preoccupied with parallel lives and secret histories. Largely written after 9/11, the novel manifests a new emphasis on the dangerousness of the modern world.... 2666 is an excruciatingly challenging novel, in which Bolaño redraws the boundaries of fiction. It is not unique in blurring the margins between realism and fantasy, between documentary and invention. But it is bold in a way that few works really are – it kicks away the divide between playfulness and seriousness. And it reminds us that literature at its best inhabits what Bolaño, with a customary wink at his own pomposity, called "the territory of risk" – it takes us to places we might not wish to go."

Stephen King in Entertainment Weekly:

"This surreal novel can't be described; it has to be experienced in all its crazed glory. Suffice it to say it concerns what may be the most horrifying real-life mass-murder spree of all time: as many as 400 women killed in the vicinity of Juarez, Mexico. Given this as a backdrop, the late Bolaño paints a mural of a poverty-stricken society that appears to be eating itself alive. And who cares? Nobody, it seems."

In 2018, Fiction Advocate published a book-length analysis of 2666 entitled An Oasis of Horror in a Desert of Boredom by author and critic Jonathan Russell Clark. An excerpt of the book was published in The Believer in March 2018.

William Skidelsky in The Guardian said:

"... the most startling thing about it is that it is literature. For it is easy to forget, as Bolaño lays down his litany of carnage, that none of what he is describing actually happened. Of course, something nearly identical to it did, in Ciudad Juárez. But Bolaño's town is Santa Teresa, and the women whose deaths he evokes so chillingly never actually existed. Critics have talked for years about the blurring of fiction and reality, but it seems to me that Bolaño, in this sequence, is doing something genuinely novel. He is deploying a technique of non-fiction (the forensic report) to describe something imaginary, but which nonetheless mirrors almost exactly an actual sequence of events. This is neither fictionalised history (attributing imaginary thoughts and deeds to real people) nor fictional documentary (as in a film such as Best in Show). It is something else again – a kind of imaginative documentation of reality. Here, as in the oral testimony sequence of The Savage Detectives, it is almost as if Bolaño were attempting to carve out a new territory – a third space, if you like – between the real and the make-believe."

=== Awards and lists ===
It won the Chilean Altazor Award in 2005. The New York Times Book Review included it in the list of "10 Best Books of 2008". The 2008 National Book Critics Circle Award for Fiction was posthumously awarded to Roberto Bolaño for 2666. It was short-listed for the Best Translated Book Award. Time also awarded it the honour of Best Fiction Book of 2008. The book is #6 on The New York Times' 100 Best Books of the 21st Century list.

== Adaptation ==
In 2007, the novel was adapted as a stage play by Spanish director Àlex Rigola, and it premiered in Bolaño's adopted hometown of Blanes. The play was the main attraction of Barcelona's Festival Grec that year.

In 2016, it was adapted into a five-hour stage play at Chicago's Goodman Theater. The stage adaptation was praised for its ambition, but according to The New York Times, it fell "short as a work of dramatic art."

In 2016, it was adapted into an 11-hour play by Julien Gosselin and his troupe "Si vous pouviez lécher mon cœur". It was presented at the Festival d'Avignon and then in Paris at the Odéon theatre as part of Festival d'Automne.
