= Chris Andrews (translator) =

Australian translator and writer

Chris Andrews FAHA (born 1962 in Newcastle, NSW) is an Australian translator, poet and author of literary criticism.

== Life ==
Andrews studied and then taught at the University of Melbourne before moving to the University of Western Sydney in 2009. In 2003 he published the first translation into English of the work of Roberto Bolaño. He was awarded the Valle-Inclán Prize in 2005 for his translation of Distant Star. In 2014 he published a monograph on Bolaño. Andrews has also translated other Spanish-language literature, such as works by César Aira. Andrews has been keen to publish translations from French but has been unable to convince publishers to commission translations for work he likes.

Andrews has also published original poetry; he won the 2003 Wesley Michel Wright Prize and his second collection of poems, Lime Green Chair, won the 2011 Anthony Hecht Poetry Prize. He was elected a Fellow of the Australian Academy of the Humanities in 2015. He won the Queensland Literary Award for Poetry and was shortlisted for the Kenneth Slessor Prize for Poetry for The Oblong Plot in 2025.

== Works ==
=== As author ===
- Poetry and Cosmogony: Science in the Writing of Queneau and Ponge, Rodopi, 1999, ISBN 978-9042005679
- Cut Lunch, Indigo, 2002, ISBN 978-1740271370
- Lime Green Chair, Waywiser Press, 2012, ISBN 9781904130512
- Roberto Bolaño's Fiction: An Expanding Universe, Columbia University Press, 2014, ISBN 978-0-231-16806-9
- The Oblong Plot, Puncher and Wattmann, 2024, ISBN 9781923099173

=== As translator ===
- The Secret of Evil by Roberto Bolaño
- The Insufferable Gaucho by Roberto Bolaño
- The Return by Roberto Bolaño
- Monsieur Pain by Roberto Bolaño
- Nazi Literature in the Americas by Roberto Bolaño
- Amulet by Roberto Bolaño
- Distant Star by Roberto Bolaño
- By Night in Chile by Roberto Bolaño
- The Skating Rink by Roberto Bolaño
- The Divorce by César Aira
- Birthday by César Aira
- The Linden Tree by César Aira
- Ema, the Captive by César Aira
- The Musical Brain by César Aira
- Shantytown by César Aira
- Varamo by César Aira
- Ghosts by César Aira
- How I Became a Nun by César Aira
- An Episode in the Life of a Landscape Painter by César Aira
