= Ignacio Echevarría =

Spanish literary critic

Ignacio Echevarría Pérez (Barcelona, 1960) is a Spanish literary critic and editor.

Echevarría was a staff member of Spanish newspaper El País., until its editors removed him in 2004 for a vituperative review of El hijo del acordeonista by Basque writer Bernardo Atxaga. The novel had appeared in Alfaguara, a publishing house then owned by the same media group as the newspaper. His ousting prompted a letter of protest signed by writers, editors and regular contributors.

Echevarría has been mistakenly taken for the literary executor of Chilean writer Roberto Bolaño, but the Bolaño Estate has categorically denied this assertion ever been true.

In 2007, Daniel Zalewski in The New Yorker called Echevarría "Spain's most prominent literary critic".
