= The Savage Detectives =

1998 novel by Roberto Bolaño

- First edition (Spanish)
- Author: Roberto Bolaño
- Original title: Los Detectives Salvajes
- Translator: Natasha Wimmer
- Language: Spanish
- Publisher: Anagrama (Spanish)
- Publication date: 1998
- Publication place: Spain
- English publication date: 2007
- Pages: 610
- ISBN: 8433910868

The Savage Detectives (Spanish: Los detectives salvajes) is a novel by Chilean writer Roberto Bolaño published in 1998. Natasha Wimmer's English translation was published by Farrar, Straus and Giroux in 2007. The novel tells the story of the search for a 1920s Mexican poet, Cesárea Tinajero, by two 1970s poets, the Chilean Arturo Belano (alter ego of Bolaño) and the Mexican Ulises Lima.

The Savage Detectives has been translated into several languages, and won the Herralde prize in 1998 and the Rómulo Gallegos prize in 1999. The novel has received a great deal of praise, both from writers and specialized critics.

== Plot summary ==
The novel is narrated in first person by several narrators and divided into three parts. The first section, "Mexicans Lost in Mexico", set in late 1975, is told by 17-year-old aspiring poet, Juan García Madero. It centers on his admittance to a roving gang of poets who refer to themselves as the Visceral Realists. He drops out of university and travels around Mexico City, becoming increasingly involved with the adherents of Visceral Realism, although he remains uncertain about Visceral Realism.

The book's second section, "The Savage Detectives," comprises nearly two-thirds of the novel's total length. The section is a polyphonic narrative which features more than forty narrators and spans twenty years, from 1976 to 1996. It consists of interviews with a variety of characters from locations around North America, Europe, the Middle East and Africa, all of whom have come into contact with the founding leaders of the Visceral Realists, Ulises Lima and Arturo Belano. Each narrator has his or her own opinion of the two, although the consensus is that they are drifters and literary elitists whose behavior often leaves a bitter taste in the mouths of those they meet. We learn that the two spent some years in Europe, frequenting bars and camp sites, and generally living a bohemian lifestyle. Lima, the more introverted of the two, serves a short sentence in an Israeli prison, while Belano challenges a literary critic to an absurd sword fight on a Spanish beach.

The third section of the book, "The Deserts of Sonora", is again narrated by Juan García Madero, and chronologically takes place straight after the first section, now in the Sonora Desert in January 1976, with Lima, Belano and a sex worker named Lupe. The section involves the "Savage Detectives" closing in on Cesárea Tinajero, an elusive poet who is the founder of Visceral Realism, while they are chased by a pimp named Alberto and a corrupt Mexican police officer.

== Characters ==
A partial character list.

Characters	Description	Based on
Arturo Belano	One of the founders of Visceral Realism. More extroverted. Chilean. (Bolaño's alter ego)	Roberto Bolaño
Ulises Lima	One of the founders of Visceral Realism. More introverted (Mario Santiago's alter ego)	Mario Santiago Papasquiaro
Juan García Madero	17-year-old Visceral Realist. Moved in with the Font family for a while, and has an encyclopaedic knowledge of classical and medieval poetic forms.	Juan García Ponce and Juan Esteban Harrington
Lupe	Young prostitute. Friend of María Font's; dates Quim Font.	
Alberto	Lupe's pimp. Gangster who measures his penis against his (large) knife every day. Chases Lupe through the Sonoran desert.	
Octavio Paz	Celebrated Mexican Poet. Nobel Prize Winner. Hated by the Visceral Realists; meets Lima in a park accompanied by assistant.	Octavio Paz
María Font	Angélica's oldest sister. She's a feminist and free spirited woman. Sleeps with Juan García Madero.	Mara Larrosa
Angélica Font	Won the Laura Damian poetry prize.	Vera Larrosa
Joaquín (Quim) Font	The Font sisters' father. Architect. Spends half of the novel in mental institutes.	Manolo Larrosa
Julio César Álamo	Visceral Realists met in his poetry workshop. Led trip to Nicaragua when Lima was lost.	Juan Bañuelos
Cesárea Tinajero	Poet considered the 'mother of Visceral Realism', dating from the conception of the Visceral Realist movement in the 1920s. Nearly forgotten. Belano, Lima, Lupe, and García Madero embark on a quest to find her in 1976.	Concha Urquiza
Amadeo Salvatierra	Old man who drinks Mezcal. Former poet turned scrivener. A member of the original Visceral Realists who is interviewed by Belano and Lima, revealing to them the only published work of Tinajero.	Rodolfo Sanabria
Perla Avilés	Went horseriding with Arturo in high school.	
Laura Jáuregui	Ex-lover of Arturo who claims Arturo started Visceral Realism to impress her.	Lisa Johnson
César Arriaga	Used to date Laura.	
Rafael Barrios	Another Visceral Realist who is equally bitter about Lima and Belano. Moved to Los Angeles after the disappearance of Ulises and Arturo, where he and his American girlfriend Barbara Patterson are interviewed during the novel's second part.	Rubén Medina
Felipe Müller	Another of the second generation Visceral Realists. Also Chilean. Took care of Arturo's mother in Barcelona.	Bruno Montané
Fabio Ernesto Logiacomo	Poet. Won Casa de las Americas competition.	Jorge Boccanera
Luis Sebastián Rosado	Contemptuous towards the Visceral Realists. An occasional lover of Luscious Skin.	José Joaquín Blanco
Alberto Moore	Friend of Luis Rosado.	
Pancho Rodríguez	Second-generation Visceral Realist poet, older brother of Moctezuma and in love with Angélica Font.	Ramon Méndez Estrada
Moctezuma Rodríguez	Younger brother of Pancho, also a poet.	Cuauhtémoc Méndez (Cuauhtémoc Méndez Estrada)
"Luscious Skin"	Bisexual Visceral Realist poet. Lover of Luis Rosado and others.	Jorge Hernández Pieldivina (Jorge Hernández "Piel Divina")
Carlos Monsiváis	Respected critic and essayist. Published a collection of work by Visceral Realists, much to his own cost.	Carlos Monsiváis
Manuel Maples Arce	Respected and self-important poet.	Manuel Maples Arce
Barbara Patterson	American hippie girl. Dates Rafael. Filthy, funny, and foul-mouthed.	
Ernesto San Epifanio	Young gay man, associated with the second generation of Visceral Realists. Photographer.	Darío Galicia
Catalina O'Hara	Painter.	Carla Rippey
Jacinto Requena	Dating Xóchitl. Slept with María Font.	José Peguero
Xóchitl García	Dating Jacinto. Eventually publishes poems and is successful writing essays. (Mother of one Franz.) Friend of all, especially Maria.	Guadalupe Ochoa
Auxilio Lacouture	Dubbed "the mother of Mexican poetry". Hid in an UNAM bathroom during the 1968 military massacre. (She is also the narrator of Bolaño's spin-off short novel Amulet.)	Alcira (Alcira Soust Scaffo)
Joaquín Vázquez Amaral	Respected poet. Liked Visceral Realists.	
Lisandro Morales	Publisher. Published Arturo, among others.	
Vargas Pardo	Ecuadorean novelist.	Miguel Donoso Pareja
Simone Darrieux	Frenchwoman who briefly studied anthropology in Mexico City, supporting herself financially by posing for local photographer. Dated Arturo for three months and introduced him to S&M practices; then returned to Paris, where she was visited by Ulises, who often showered at her house. This character almost certainly reappears as the wife of Jacobo Urenda in Ch. 25 (where she is named solely as Simone, but she asks her husband to describe Belano and claims immediately to understand him).	
Hipólito Garcés	Friend of Ulises in Paris. Cooked for him, but ripped him off.	
Roberto Rosas	Friend of Ulises in Paris. Hated Hipólito.	José Rosas Ribeyro
Sofía Pellegrini	Friend of Ulises in Paris.	
Michel Bulteau	French poet oft-read by Ulises in Mexico. Ulises called him in Paris.	Michel Bulteau
Mary Watson	English hippie. Slept with Arturo when he was a night watchman at a camp.	
Alain Lebert	Fisherman in Spain. Friend of Arturo's, along with the pirate, Margarite.	
Norman Bolzman	Friend in Israel of Ulises. Lived with Claudia and Daniel. Dated Claudia; Ulises was in love with her.	Norman Sverdlin
Claudia	Lived with Norman. Ulises was in love with her.	Claudia Kerik (in Spanish)
Daniel Grossman	Friend in Israel with Claudia and Norman.	Daniel Goldin
Heimito Künst	In jail with Ulises in Israel. Lived with him in Vienna. Paranoid, possibly mad. Possibly a neo-nazi.	Heimito von Doderer
José "Zopilote" Colina	Publisher. Full of himself.	José de la Colina
Verónica Volkow	Trotsky's great-granddaughter.	Verónica Volkow
Alfonso Pérez Camarga	Painter. Bought drugs from Arturo and Ulises.	
Hugo Montero	Brought Ulises to Nicaragua with Don Pancracio, Labarca, and Mexican poets.	
Andrés Ramírez	A Chilean stowaway. Goes to Spain, wins the lottery, and much later gives Belano a job.	
Susana Puig	A nurse who had an affair with a sick Arturo.	
Edith Oster	A lover who broke Arturo's heart in Barcelona.	Edna Lieberman
Xosé Lendoiro	Galician lawyer, adventurer, aspiring poet, admirer of classical Greek and Roman literature who offers Belano a job of reviewing a law school journal.	
Iñaki Echavarne	Spanish literary critic. Challenged to a sabre duel by Belano.	Ignacio Echevarría

== Critical reception ==
James Wood wrote in The New York Times, "A novel all about poetry and poets, one of whose heroes is a lightly disguised version of the author himself: how easily this could be nothing more than a precious lattice of ludic narcissism and unbearably "literary" adventures... The novel is wildly enjoyable (as well as, finally, full of lament), in part because Bolaño, despite all the game-playing, has a worldly, literal sensibility."

Benjamin Kunkel, writing for London Review of Books, "It’s something close to a miracle that Bolaño can produce such intense narrative interest in a book made up of centrifugal monologues spinning away from two absentee main characters, and the diary entries of its most peripheral figure. And yet, in spite of the book’s apparent (and often real) formlessness, a large part of its distinction is its virtually unprecedented achievement in multiply-voiced narration."

Slate wrote, "The Savage Detectives sings a love song to the grandeur of Latin American literature and to the passions it inspires, and there is no reason to suppose that, in spite of every prediction, these particular grandeurs and passions have reached their appointed end."

== Elements in common with 2666 ==
2666, Bolaño's final, posthumous novel has many points in common with The Savage Detectives.

- Both conclude in the fictional city of Santa Teresa, in the Mexican state of Sonora, which acts as a stand-in for Ciudad Juárez.
- In the second part of The Savage Detectives, an author named Arcimboldi is mentioned. In 2666 he will become the central character Benno von Archimboldi.
- In a dialogue about Cesárea Tinajero, the year 2600 is referred to as "the year of misfortunes".
- Late in the novel there is a section where, 'Cesárea said something about days to come... and the teacher, to change the subject, asked her what times she meant and when they would be. And Cesárea named a date, sometime around the year 2600. Two thousand six hundred and something.'

According to the Note to the First Edition of 2666, among Bolaño's notes is a line saying that "The narrator of 2666 is Arturo Belano," a character from The Savage Detectives, as well as a line for the end of 2666, "And that's it, friends. I've done it all, I've lived it all. If I had the strength, I'd cry. I bid you all goodbye, Arturo Belano".
