= Roberto Bolaño =

Chilean writer (1953–2003)

- Born: Roberto Bolaño Ávalos; 28 April 1953; Santiago, Chile
- Died: 15 July 2003 (aged 50); Barcelona, Spain
- Occupations: Writer; poet
- Writing career
- Language: Spanish
- Notable works: The Savage Detectives (1998); 2666 (2004)

Roberto Bolaño Ávalos (Spanish: [roˈβeɾto βoˈlaɲo ˈaβalos]; 28 April 1953 – 15 July 2003) was a Chilean novelist, short-story writer, poet and essayist. In 1999, Bolaño won the Rómulo Gallegos Prize for his novel The Savage Detectives, and in 2008 he was posthumously awarded the National Book Critics Circle Award for Fiction for his novel 2666, which was described by board member Marcela Valdes as a "work so rich and dazzling that it will surely draw readers and scholars for ages".

Bolaño's work is highly regarded by writers and literary critics. The New York Times described him as "the most significant Latin American literary voice of his generation" and he has frequently been compared with Jorge Luis Borges and Julio Cortázar. His books have been translated into numerous languages, including English, French, German, Italian, Lithuanian, Hungarian, Dutch and Greek.

== Life ==
=== Childhood in Chile ===
Bolaño was born in 1953 in Santiago, the son of a truck driver (who was also a boxer) and a teacher. While he was born in Santiago, he never lived there. Instead, he and his sister spent their early years in southern and coastal Chile, attending primary school in Viña del Mar and later moving to Quilpué and Cauquenes. By his own account, Bolaño was skinny, nearsighted, and bookish. He was dyslexic and was often bullied at school, where he felt like an outsider. He came from a lower-middle-class family, and while his mother was a fan of best-sellers, they were not an intellectual family. He had one younger sister. He was ten when he started his first job, selling bus tickets on the Quilpué-Valparaíso route. He spent the greater part of his childhood living in the Chilean town of Los Ángeles, Bío Bío.

=== Youth in Mexico ===
In 1968, Bolaño moved with his family to Mexico City, dropped out of school, worked as a journalist, and became active in left-wing political causes.

=== Brief return to Chile ===
A key episode in Bolaño's life, mentioned in different forms in several of his works, occurred in 1973, when he left Mexico for Chile to "help build the revolution" by supporting the democratic socialist government of Salvador Allende. After Augusto Pinochet's right-wing military coup against Allende, Bolaño was arrested on suspicion of being a "terrorist" and spent eight days in custody. He was rescued by two former classmates who had become prison guards. Bolaño describes this experience in the story "Dance Card". According to the version of events he provides in this story, he was not tortured as he had expected, but "in the small hours I could hear them torturing others; I couldn't sleep and there was nothing to read except a magazine in English that someone had left behind. The only interesting article in it was about a house that had once belonged to Dylan Thomas... I got out of that hole thanks to a pair of detectives who had been at high school with me." The episode is also recounted, from the point of view of Bolaño's former classmates, in the story "Detectives". Nevertheless, since 2009, Bolaño's Mexican friends from that era have cast doubts on whether he was even in Chile in 1973 at all.

Bolaño had conflicted feelings about his native country. He was notorious in Chile for his fierce attacks on Isabel Allende and other members of the literary establishment. "He didn't fit into Chile, and the rejection that he experienced left him free to say whatever he wanted, which can be a good thing for a writer," commented Chilean-Argentinian novelist and playwright Ariel Dorfman.

=== Return to Mexico ===
On his overland return from Chile to Mexico in 1974, Bolaño allegedly spent an interlude in El Salvador, accompanied by the poet Roque Dalton and the guerrillas of the Farabundo Martí National Liberation Front, though the veracity of this episode has been cast into doubt.

In the 1960s, Bolaño, an atheist since his youth, became a Trotskyist and in 1975 a founding member of Infrarrealismo (Infrarealism), a minor poetic movement. He affectionately parodied aspects of the movement in The Savage Detectives.

On his return to Mexico, Bolaño lived as a literary enfant terrible and bohemian poet, "a professional provocateur feared at all the publishing houses even though he was a nobody, bursting into literary presentations and readings", as recalled by his editor Jorge Herralde.

=== Move to Spain ===
Bolaño moved to Europe in 1977, and finally made his way to Spain, where he married and settled on the Mediterranean coast near Barcelona, on the Costa Brava, working as a dishwasher, campground custodian, bellhop, and garbage collector. He used his spare time to write. From the '80s to his death, he lived in the small Catalan beach town of Blanes, in the province of Girona.

Bolaño continued with poetry, before shifting to fiction in his early forties. In an interview Bolaño said that he began writing fiction because he felt responsible for the future financial well-being of his family, which he knew he could never secure from the earnings of a poet. This was confirmed by Jorge Herralde, who explained that Bolaño "abandoned his parsimonious beatnik existence" because the birth of his son in 1990 made him "decide that he was responsible for his family's future and that it would be easier to earn a living by writing fiction." However, he continued to think of himself primarily as a poet, and a collection of his verse, spanning 20 years, was published in 2000 under the title Los perros románticos (The Romantic Dogs).

=== Declining health and death ===
Bolaño's death in 2003 came after a long period of declining health. He experienced liver failure and had been on a liver transplant waiting list while working on 2666; he was third on the list at the time of his death.

Six weeks before he died, Bolaño's fellow Latin American novelists hailed him as the most important figure of his generation at an international conference he attended in Seville. Among his closest friends were the novelists Rodrigo Fresán and Enrique Vila-Matas; Fresán's tribute included the statement that "Roberto emerged as a writer at a time when Latin America no longer believed in utopias, when paradise had become hell, and that sense of monstrousness and waking nightmares and constant flight from something horrid permeates 2666 and all his work." "His books are political," Fresán also observed, "but in a way that is more personal than militant or demagogic, that is closer to the mystique of the beatniks than the Boom." In Fresán's view, he "was one of a kind, a writer who worked without a net, who went all out, with no brakes, and in doing so, created a new way to be a great Latin American writer." Larry Rohter of the New York Times wrote, "Bolaño joked about the 'posthumous', saying the word 'sounds like the name of a Roman gladiator, one who is undefeated,' and he would no doubt be amused to see how his stock has risen now that he is dead." He died of liver failure in the Vall d'Hebron University Hospital in Barcelona on 15 July 2003.

Bolaño was survived by his Spanish wife, Carolina López, and their two children, whom he once called "my only motherland". In his last interview, published by the Mexican edition of Playboy magazine, Bolaño said he regarded himself as a Latin American, adding that "my only country is my two children and wife and perhaps, though in second place, some moments, streets, faces or books that are in me, and which one day I will forget..."

== Works ==
Although known for his novels, novellas, and short stories, Bolaño was a prolific poet of free verse and prose poems. Bolaño saw himself primarily as a poet, as a character states in The Savage Detectives, "Poetry is more than enough for me, although sooner or later I'm bound to commit the vulgarity of writing stories."

In rapid succession, he published a series of critically acclaimed works, the most important of which are the novel Los detectives salvajes (The Savage Detectives), the novella Nocturno de Chile (By Night in Chile), and, posthumously, the novel 2666. His two collections of short stories Llamadas telefónicas and Putas asesinas were awarded literary prizes. In 2009 a number of unpublished novels were discovered among the author's papers.

=== Novels and novellas ===
==== The Skating Rink ====
The Skating Rink (La pista de hielo in Spanish) is set in the seaside town of Z, on the Costa Brava, north of Barcelona and is told by three male narrators while revolving around a beautiful figure-skating champion, Nuria Martí. When she is suddenly dropped from the Olympic team, a pompous but besotted civil servant secretly builds a skating rink in a local ruin of a mansion, using public funds. But Nuria has affairs, provokes jealousy, and the skating rink becomes a crime scene.

==== Nazi Literature in the Americas ====
Nazi Literature in the Americas (La literatura Nazi en América in Spanish) is an entirely fictitious, ironic encyclopedia of fascist Latin American and American writers and critics, blinded to their own mediocrity and sparse readership by passionate self-mythification. While this is a risk that literature generally runs in Bolaño's works, these characters stand out by force of the intended heinousness of their political philosophy. Published in 1996, the events of the book take place from the late 19th century up to 2029. The last portrait was expanded into the novel Distant Star.

==== Distant Star ====
Distant Star (Estrella distante in Spanish) is a novella nested in the politics of the Pinochet regime, concerned with murder, photography and even poetry blazed across the sky by the smoke of air force planes. This dark satirical work deals with the history of Chilean politics in a morbid and sometimes humorous fashion.

==== The Savage Detectives ====
The Savage Detectives (Los detectives salvajes in Spanish) has been compared by Jorge Edwards to Julio Cortázar's Rayuela and José Lezama Lima's Paradiso.

In a review in El País, the Spanish critic and former literary editor of said newspaper Ignacio Echevarría declared it "the novel that Borges would have written." (Bolaño often expressed his love for Borges and Cortázar's work, and once concluded an overview of contemporary Argentinian literature by saying that "one should read Borges more.") "Bolaño's genius is not just the extraordinary quality of his writing, but also that he does not conform to the paradigm of the Latin American writer", said Echeverría. "His writing is neither magical realism, nor baroque nor localist, but an imaginary, extraterritorial mirror of Latin America, more as a kind of state of mind than a specific place."

The central section of The Savage Detectives presents a long, fragmentary series of reports about the trips and adventures of Arturo Belano, a consonantly named alter-ego of Bolaño, who also appears in other stories & novels, and Ulises Lima, between 1976 and 1996. These trips and adventures, narrated by 52 characters, take them from Mexico City to Israel, Paris, Barcelona, Los Angeles, San Francisco, Vienna and finally to Liberia during its civil war in the mid-nineties. The reports are sandwiched at the beginning and end of the novel by the story of their quest to find Cesárea Tinajero, the founder of "real visceralismo", a Mexican avant-garde literary movement of the twenties, set in late 1975 and early 1976, and narrated by the aspiring 17-year-old poet García Madero, who tells us first about the poetic and social scene around the new "visceral realists" and later closes the novel with his account of their escape from Mexico City to the state of Sonora. Bolaño called The Savage Detectives "a love letter to my generation".

In his essay "Los detectives salvajes: Bolaño contra el Bildungsroman", Peruvian writer Gunter Silva Passuni interprets The Savage Detectives as an inverted Bildungsroman. According to Silva, the novel subverts the traditional coming-of-age narrative: instead of leading its protagonists toward maturity and integration, it traces their drift into fragmentation and loss. The search for the missing poet Cesárea Tinajero functions, in Silva's view, "less as a plot than as a void", structuring the story around what cannot be found.

Silva argues that what ultimately endures is not literary accomplishment but the sense of fraternity among the "real visceralists". Literature, he suggests, is experienced as friendship and pursuit rather than as completed artistic work. The figure of Tinajero thus symbolizes an unattainable, essential form of literature—"something lost, impossible to fix or canonize". Consequently, Silva describes the novel as "an epic of failure", where the true essence of literature resides not in finished books but in the act of seeking them and in the communities formed through that search.

==== Amulet ====
Amulet (Amuleto in Spanish) focuses on the Uruguayan poet Auxilio Lacouture, who also appears in The Savage Detectives as a minor character trapped in a bathroom at the Universidad Nacional Autónoma de México (UNAM) in Mexico City for two weeks while the army storms the school. The narrative unfolds amid the political and intellectual upheaval of 1968, a year marked by widespread student protests across Mexican universities that ultimately culminated in the army's massacre of hundreds of students in Tlatelolco Square, Mexico City, on October 2. In this short novel, she runs across a host of Latin American artists and writers, among them Arturo Belano, Bolaño's alter ego. Unlike The Savage Detectives, Amulet stays in Auxilio's first-person voice, while still allowing for the frenetic scattering of personalities Bolaño is known for.

The scholar Ángel Díaz Miranda, in a review of Amulet, established a continuum between Bolano's novel and Elena Poniatowska’s The Night of Tlatelolco (La noche de Tlatelolco in Spanish), a seminal work on the student protests of 1968.

==== By Night in Chile ====
By Night in Chile (Nocturno de Chile in Spanish), is a narrative constructed as the loose, uneditorialised deathbed rantings of a Chilean Opus Dei priest and failed poet, Sebastián Urrutia Lacroix. At a crucial point in his career, Father Urrutia is approached by two agents of Opus Dei, who inform him that he has been chosen to visit Europe to study the preservation of old churches – the perfect job for a cleric with artistic sensitivities.

On his arrival, he is told that the major threat to European cathedrals is pigeon droppings, and that his Old World counterparts have devised a clever solution to the problem. They have become falconers, and in town after town he watches as the priests' hawks viciously dispatch flocks of harmless birds. Chillingly, the Jesuit's failure to protest against this bloody means of architectural preservation signals to his employers that he will serve as a passive accomplice to the predatory and brutal methods of the Pinochet regime. This is the beginning of Bolano's indictment of "l'homme intellectuel" ("intellectual man") who retreats into art, using aestheticism as a cloak and shield while the world lies around him, nauseatingly unchanged, perennially unjust and cruel. This book represents Bolaño's views upon returning to Chile and finding a haven for the consolidation of power structures and human rights violations. This book was originally going to be called Tormenta de Mierda (Shit Storm in English) but was convinced by Jorge Herralde and Juan Villoro to change the name.

==== Antwerp ====
Antwerp is considered by his literary executor Ignacio Echevarría to be the big bang of the Bolaño universe. The loose prose-poem novel was written in 1980 when Bolaño was 27; the book remained unpublished until 2002, when it was published in Spanish as Amberes, a year before the author's death. It contains a loose narrative, structured less around a story arc and more around motifs, reappearing characters and anecdotes, many of which went on to become common material for Bolaño: crimes and campgrounds, drifters and poetry, sex and love, corrupt cops and misfits. The back of the first New Directions edition of the book contains a quote from Bolaño about Antwerp: "The only novel that doesn't embarrass me is Antwerp."

==== 2666 ====
2666 was published in 2004, reportedly as a first draft submitted to his publisher after his death. The text of 2666 was the major preoccupation of the last five years of his life when his health sharply declined due to his liver problems. At more than 1,100 pages (898 pages in the English-language edition), the novel is divided into five "parts". Focused on the mostly unsolved and still ongoing serial murders of the fictional Santa Teresa (based on Ciudad Juárez), 2666 depicts the horror of the 20th century through a wide cast of characters, including police officers, journalists, criminals, and four academics on a quest to find the secretive, German writer Benno von Archimboldi—who also resembles Bolaño himself. In 2008, the book won the National Book Critics Circle Award for Fiction. The award was accepted by Natasha Wimmer, the book's translator. In March 2009, The Guardian newspaper reported that an additional Part 6 of 2666 was among papers found by researchers going through Bolaño's literary estate.

==== The Third Reich ====
The Third Reich (El Tercer Reich in Spanish) was written in 1989 but only discovered among Bolaño's papers after he died. It was published in Spanish in 2010 and in English in 2011. The protagonist is Udo Berger, a German wargame champion. With his girlfriend Ingeborg he goes back to the small town on the Costa Brava where he spent his childhood summers. He plays a game of Rise and Decline of the Third Reich with a stranger.

==== Woes of the True Policeman ====
Woes of the True Policeman (Los sinsabores del verdadero policía in Spanish) was first published in Spanish in 2011 and in English in 2012. The novel has been described as offering readers plot lines and characters that supplement or propose variations on Bolaño's novel 2666. It was begun in the 1980s but remained a work-in-progress until his death.

==== The Spirit of Science Fiction ====
The Spirit of Science Fiction (El espíritu de la ciencia-ficción in Spanish) was completed by Bolaño in approximately 1984. It was published posthumously in Spanish in 2016 and in English in 2019. The novel is seen by many as an ur-text to The Savage Detectives, "populated with precursory character sketches and situations" and centering on the activities of young poets and writers living in Mexico City.

=== Short story collections ===
==== Last Evenings on Earth ====
Last Evenings on Earth (From Llamadas telefónicas and Putas Asesinas in Spanish) is a collection of fourteen short stories narrated by a host of different voices primarily in the first person. A number are narrated by an author, "B.", who is – in a move typical of the author – a stand-in for the author himself.

==== The Return ====
The Return is a collection of twelve short stories, first published in English in 2010, and translated by Chris Andrews. It includes the stories from Spanish-language collections Llamadas Telefonicas and Putas Asesinas not published in Last Evenings on Earth.

==== The Insufferable Gaucho ====
The Insufferable Gaucho (El gaucho insufrible in Spanish) collects a disparate variety of work. It contains five short stories and two essays, with the title story inspired by Argentinian author Jorge Luis Borges's short story "The South," said story being mentioned in Bolaño's work.

==== The Secret of Evil ====
The Secret of Evil (El secreto del mal in Spanish) is a collection of short stories and recollections or essays. The Spanish version was published in 2007 and contains 21 pieces, 19 of which appear in the English edition, published in 2010. Several of the stories in the collection feature characters that have appeared in previous works by Bolaño, including his alter ego Arturo Belano and characters that first appeared in Nazi Literature in the Americas.

=== Poems ===
==== The Romantic Dogs ====
The Romantic Dogs (Los perros románticos in Spanish), published in 2006, is his first collection of poetry to be translated into English, appearing in a bilingual edition in 2008 under New Directions and translated by Laura Healy. Bolaño has stated that he considered himself first and foremost a poet and took up fiction writing primarily later in life in order to support his children.

==== The Unknown University ====
A deluxe edition of Bolaño's complete poetry, The Unknown University, was translated from Spanish by Laura Healy (Chile, New Directions, 2013). It was shortlisted for the 2014 Best Translated Book Award.

== Themes ==
In the final decade of his life, Bolaño produced a significant body of work, consisting of short stories and novels. In his fiction, the characters are often novelists or poets, some of them aspiring and others famous, and writers appear ubiquitous in Bolaño's world, variously cast as heroes, villains, detectives, and iconoclasts.

Other significant themes of his work include quests, "the myth of poetry", the "interrelationship of poetry and crime", the inescapable violence of modern life in Latin America, and the essential human business of youth, love, and death.

In one of his stories, Dentist, Bolaño appears to set out his basic aesthetic principles. The narrator pays a visit to an old friend, a dentist. The friend introduces him to a poor Indian boy who turns out to be a literary genius. At one point during a long evening of inebriated conversation, the dentist expresses what he believes to be the essence of art:

That's what art is, he said, the story of a life in all its particularity. It's the only thing that really is particular and personal. It's the expression and, at the same time, the fabric of the particular. And what do you mean by the fabric of the particular? I asked, supposing he would answer: Art. I was also thinking, indulgently, that we were pretty drunk already and that it was time to go home. But my friend said: What I mean is the secret story...The secret story is the one we'll never know, although we're living it from day to day, thinking we're alive, thinking we've got it all under control and the stuff we overlook doesn't matter. But every damn thing matters! It's just that we don't realize. We tell ourselves that art runs on one track and life, our lives, on another, we don't even realize that's a lie.

Like large parts of Bolaño's work, this conception of fiction manages to be at once elusive and powerfully suggestive. As Jonathan Lethem has commented, "Reading Roberto Bolaño is like hearing the secret story, being shown the fabric of the particular, watching the tracks of art and life merge at the horizon and linger there like a dream from which we awake inspired to look more attentively at the world."

When discussing the nature of literature, including his own, Bolaño emphasized its inherent political qualities. He wrote, "All literature, in a certain sense, is political. I mean, first, it's a reflection on politics, and second, it's also a political program. The former alludes to reality—to the nightmare or benevolent dream that we call reality—which ends, in both cases, with death and the obliteration not only of literature, but of time. The latter refers to the small bits and pieces that survive, that persist; and to reason."

Bolaño's writings repeatedly manifest a concern with the nature and purpose of literature and its relationship to life. One recent assessment of his works discusses his idea of literary culture as a "whore":

Among the many acid pleasures of the work of Roberto Bolaño, who died at 50 in 2003, is his idea that culture, in particular literary culture, is a whore. In the face of political repression, upheaval and danger, writers continue to swoon over the written word, and this, for Bolaño, is the source both of nobility and of pitch-black humor. In his novel "The Savage Detectives," two avid young Latino poets never lose faith in their rarefied art no matter the vicissitudes of life, age and politics. If they are sometimes ridiculous, they are always heroic. But what can it mean, he asks us and himself, in his dark, extraordinary, stinging novella "By Night in Chile," that the intellectual elite can write poetry, paint and discuss the finer points of avant-garde theater as the junta tortures people in basements? The word has no national loyalty, no fundamental political bent; it's a genie that can be summoned by any would-be master. Part of Bolaño's genius is to ask, via ironies so sharp you can cut your hands on his pages, if we perhaps find a too-easy comfort in art, if we use it as anesthetic, excuse and hide-out in a world that is very busy doing very real things to very real human beings. Is it courageous to read Plato during a military coup or is it something else?

—Stacey D'Erasmo, The New York Times Book Review, 24 February 2008

Nazism and fascism is a recurring theme across Bolaño's work, most notably in Nazi Literature in the Americas and The Third Reich. Critic Jacob Silverman described the use of Nazism in Bolaño's work as "a kind of shadow text that runs throughout his work, showing how the narcissism of power has much in common with the narcissism of authorship." From this lens, Bolaño's ambitious young authors in exile could be seen as a foil to the foiled ambition of Nazis in exile: "the malignance of ambition as well as the morally treacherous choice that some of Bolaño’s generation made, throwing their lot in with Augusto Pinochet."

== Translations ==
At the time of his death, Bolaño had 37 publishing contracts in ten countries. Posthumously, the list grew to include more countries, including the United States, and amounted to 50 contracts and 49 translations in twelve countries, all of them prior to the publication of 2666. Bolaño's first American publisher, Barbara Epler of New Directions, read a galley proof of By Night in Chile and decided to acquire it, along with Distant Star and Last Evenings on Earth, all translated by Chris Andrews. By Night in Chile came out in 2003 and was highly praised by Susan Sontag; at the same time, Bolaño's work also began appearing in various magazines, which gained him broader recognition among English readers. The New Yorker first published a Bolaño short story, Gómez Palacio, in its 8 August 2005 issue.

By 2006, Bolaño's rights were represented by Carmen Balcells, who decided to have his two most famous books, The Savage Detectives and 2666, reissued by a larger publishing house; both were eventually published by Farrar, Straus and Giroux (The Savage Detectives in 2007 and 2666 in 2008) in a translation by Natasha Wimmer. At the same time, New Directions took on the publication of the rest of Bolaño's work (to the extent that it was known at the time) for a total of 13 books, translated by Laura Healy (two poetry collections), Natasha Wimmer (Antwerp and Between Parentheses) and Chris Andrews (six novels and three short story collections).

The posthumous discovery of additional works by Bolaño has thus far led to the publication of the novel The Third Reich (El Tercer Reich in Spanish), (Farrar, Straus and Giroux, 2011, translated by Wimmer) and The Secret of Evil (El Secreto del Mal), (New Directions, 2012, translated by Wimmer and Andrews), a collection of short stories. A translation of the novel Woes of the True Policeman (Los sinsabores del verdadero policía in Spanish), (Farrar, Straus and Giroux, translated by Wimmer) was released on 13 November 2012. A collection of three novellas, Cowboy Graves (Sepulcros de vaqueros in Spanish), (Penguin Press, translated by Wimmer), was released on 16 February 2021.

In 2024, Bolaño's North American print and e-book rights were acquired by Farrar, Straus and Giroux which announced plans to reprint a large portion of Bolaño's catalog in English under the imprint Picador in June 2024, beginning with By Night in Chile, The Return, and Antwerp.
