= Editorial Anagrama =

Spanish publishing house based in Barcelona

Anagrama
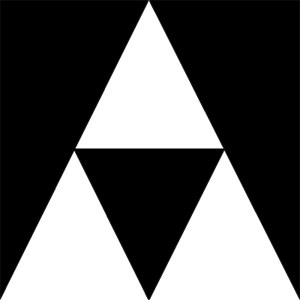
- Logo
- Founded: 1969
- Founder: Jorge Herralde
- Country of origin: Spain
- Headquarters location: Barcelona
- Fiction genres: Narrative; Lyric poetry; Essay
- Owner: Feltrinelli
- Official website: www.anagrama-ed.es

Anagrama is a Spanish publisher founded in 1969 by Jorge Herralde, later sold to the Italian publisher Feltrinelli.

== History ==
Anagrama was founded in 1969 by Jorge Herralde. In 2010, it was sold to the Italian publisher Feltrinelli.

A Catalan language series, Llibres anagrama, was created in 2014.

In January 2017, the publisher was acquired by the Feltrinelli Group, with Jorge Herralde appointed chairman of the board, while and Silvia Sesé took over as editorial director of Anagrama.

In November 2021, La Bella Varsovia, a poetry publisher headed by poet Elena Medel, became an imprint of Anagrama, with Medel continuing as director.

Anagrama has published thousands of titles since 1969.

== Description ==
Anagrama publishes around 100 books annually, including fiction, non-fiction, and a paperback series.

Its most important series is Narrativas hispánicas, consisting of works by many of the most important Spanish-language writers of the modern era, including Sergio Pitol, Enrique Vila-Matas, Roberto Bolaño, Álvaro Enrigue, Ricardo Piglia, Javier Tomeo, Álvaro Pombo, among others. It also publishes Panorama de narrativas, which consists of prominent works translated from other languages, and Argumentos, or essays by all types of thinkers, philosophers, and contemporary writers.

Around 75 per cent of its sales are made in Spain. The publisher and its translators have been criticized by Latin American readers for the overuse of typically Castilian Spanish expressions,

== Awards ==
The publishing house awards two annual prizes for unpublished works, both highly prestigious within the Spanish-speaking world: the Anagrama Essay Prize (since 1973) and the Herralde Novel Prize (since 1983). To organize the former, on which he had been working since its conception in 1970, Jorge Herralde had to elude francoist censorship, which blocked the project for a year. Xavier Rubert de Ventós won the first Anagrama Prize in 1973, and since then it has distinguished prominent essayists and writers (primarily Spanish) such as Eugenio Trías, Pere Gimferrer, Fernando Savater, Luis Racionero, Carmen Martín Gaite, José Antonio Marina, Soledad Puértolas, and the Mexican author Carlos Monsiváis. The announcement of the Herralde Novel Prize in 1983 coincided, on the other hand, with the creation of the Narrtivas hispánicas collection, the Anagrama's first foray into fiction in Spanish language: the prize and the collection contributed decisively to the dissemination of the Spanish novelists of the time. In 2016, the Llibres Anagrama Prize was awarded for the first time, for original fiction written in the Catalan language.
