= American literature in Spanish =

Spanish-language literature in the United States

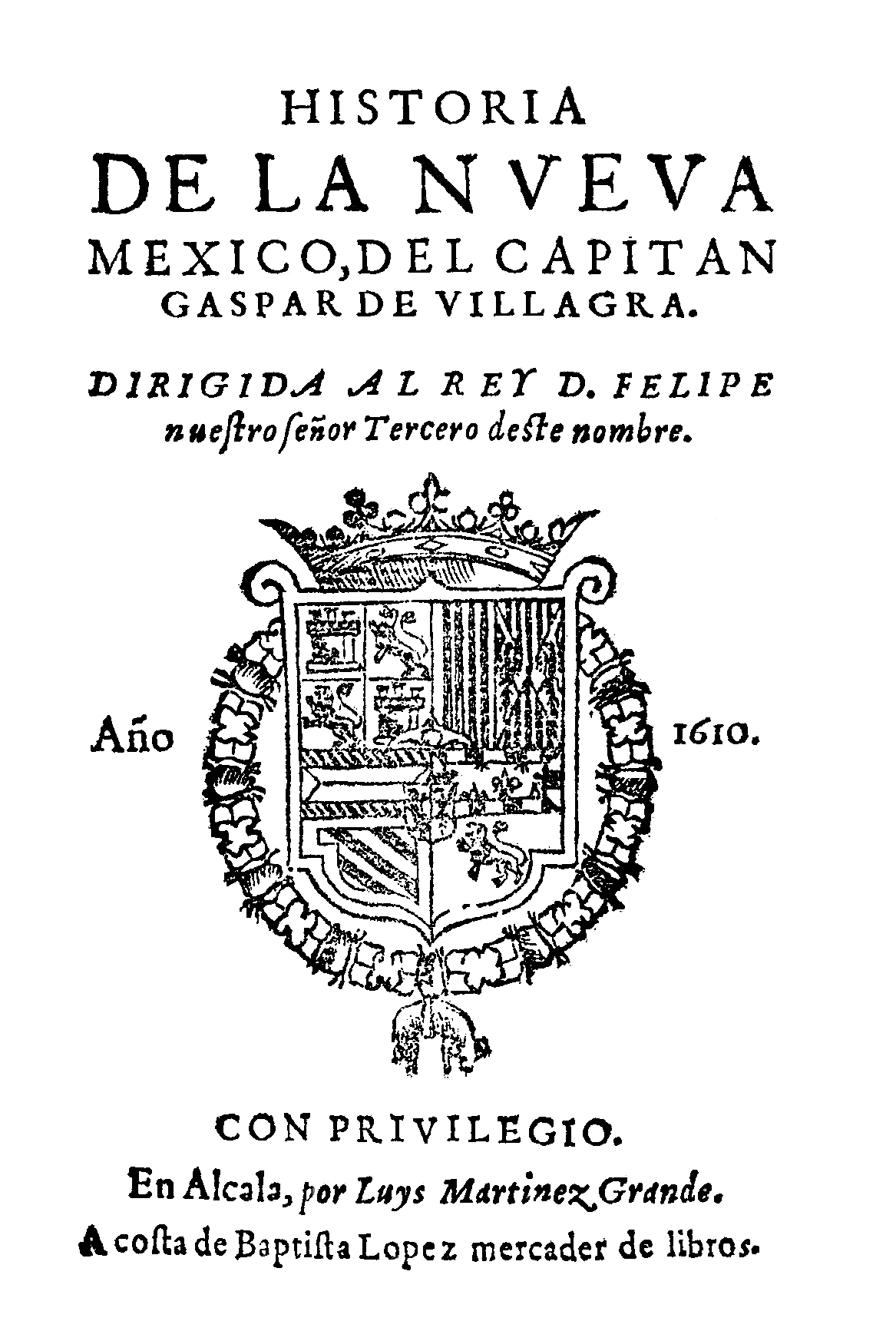
"Historia de la Nueva Mexico", the first Spanish language writings in the modern U.S. by Gaspar Pérez de Villagrá.

American literature in Spanish in the United States dates back as 1610 when the Spanish explorer Gaspar Pérez de Villagrá published his epic poem Historia de Nuevo México (History of New Mexico). He was an early chronicler of the conquest of the Americas and a forerunner of Spanish-language literature in the United States given his focus on the American landscape and the customs of the people. However, it was not until the late 20th century that Spanish language literature written by Americans was regularly published in the United States.

The rise of Spanish-language Latino literature has been fraught with obstacles related to publication and audience. Latino/a authors have expanded audience expectations by attending to narrative innovation and design and by creating challenging reading situations. Rather than compose their narratives with an actual audience in mind, many Latino/a authors sought to write for a new, ideal audience capable of engaging with even the most complex story worlds and stylistic innovations. From the 1960s to the present, breakthrough authors who created new audiences include Oscar “Zeta” Acosta, Gloria Anzaldúa, Piri Thomas, Giannina Braschi, Sandra Cisneros, Junot Díaz, and Gilbert Hernandez have engaged a sophisticated bilingual readership in their avant-garde narratives, code-switching, serialization, and intertextual play in Spanish, Spanglish, and English. Their works, often first published in independent and academic presses, were widely taught as foundational works in the burgeoning fields of Latino Studies and Third World Feminisms; their academic following helped to create a commercial market for Latino literature.

By 2000, many more Mexican-Americans/Chicanos, Cuban-Americans, Puerto Ricans on the island and Nuyoricans on the mainland, and US immigrants from Latin America have published literature in Spanish in US trade, academic, and mainstream publishing houses. Other US based authors who either write in Spanish or who regularly use Spanish phrases in their works include: Julia Álvarez, Martín Espada, Rhina Espaillat, Nicholasa Mohr, Cristina García, Óscar Hijuelos, Cherríe Moraga, Ricardo Pau-Llosa, Gustavo Pérez Firmat, and Ilan Stavans.

== American novels in Spanish and Spanglish ==
Piri Thomas's Down These Mean Streets and Giannina Braschi's Yo-Yo Boing! are groundbreaking American novels for their prominent use Spanish and Spanglish and their unflinching description of urban life for Hispanic Americans. Piri Thomas was pressured to self-translate Spanish passages into English for the publication of his 1967 novel at his publisher’s insistence that the text not alienate monolingual English readers. Nonetheless, the book was banned by New York City public schools because it was perceived, as reported by The New York Times in 1971, as "a threat to their values. Many... who assail 'Down These Mean Streets' indicate they do so not so much because it portrays life in New York's Puerto Rican community as because the portrayal includes vulgarities and descriptions of sexual acts". Three decades years later, Giannina Braschi's 1998 novel, featured entire chapters written in untranslated Spanish and extensive dramatic dialogues that mixed Spanish, Spanglish, and English. Though Braschi's bilingual work also used vulgarities and addressed social justice issues such as domestic violence, racism, discrimination, sexual harassment directly, Yo-Yo Boing! book was not censored. However, critic Christopher Gonzalez observes that non-Spanish speaking reviewers considered the work 'an affront'". Gonzalez notes that bilingual reviewers, such as David William Foster in Review of Contemporary Fiction praised Yo-Yo Boing! for its "superb exploration for the lived experiences of Hispanics." Other critics such as Harold Augenbraum, Ilan Stavans, Doris Sommer, and Adriana Estill have used the phrase "a tour de force" to describe the novel

== American poetry in Spanish and Spanglish ==
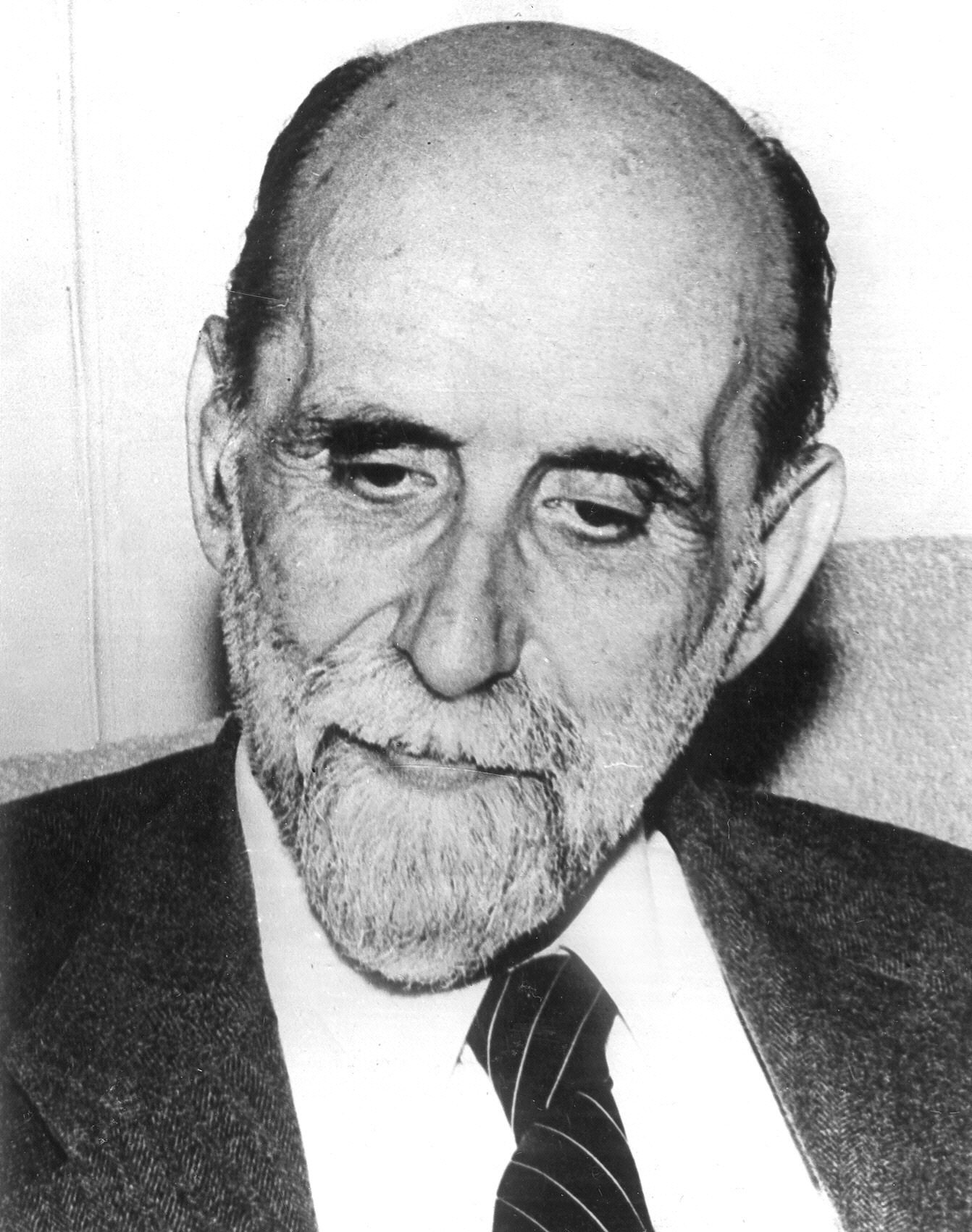
Juan Jiménez Spanish poet.

Major Spanish poets who spent time in the United States and wrote poetry in Spanish during their stay include Federico García Lorca who wrote his best known works, including Poeta en Nueva York in New York City in 1929. Though Lorca only stayed in the United States for 10 months, the work is considered both Spanish and American literature given the subject of New York City. While in exile in San Juan, Puerto Rico after the Spanish civil war, Nobel Prize laureate Juan Ramón Jiménez wrote Voces de mi copla (Voices of My Song) and Animal de fondo (Animal of Depth) in the 1940s.

Prominent American-born poets who wrote in Spanish about life in American cities include Pedro Pietri (Puerto Rican Obituary), Giannina Braschi (El imperio de los sueños/Empire of Dreams, 1988), Julia de Burgos (Yo Misma Fui Mi Ruta (I Was My Own Path), and Ana Castillo. Williams Carlos Williams used Spanish titles and flourishes in his poetry but did not write publish extensive works in Spanish.

Since 2012, when University of Iowa established the country's first MFA Spanish Creative Writings Program, other American universities such as Hofstra and New York University has also established MFA programs in Spanish.

== Anthologies and magazines ==
Organized by decades, these publications debuted new work by US based Latino/a and Latinx authors who wrote in Spanish and Spanglish.

=== 1970s ===
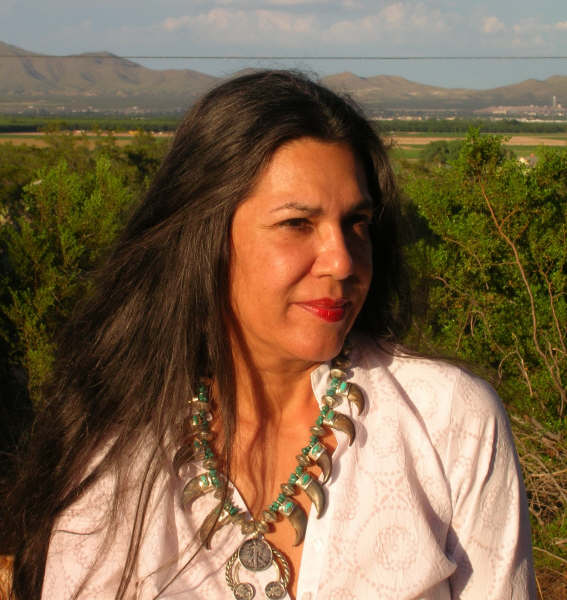
Ana Castillo editor of La Tolteca, an arts and literary magazine.

- Revista Chicano-Riqueña was the first national magazine of US Hispanic literature in Spanish. It was first published in 1973 and co-edited by Nicolás Kanellos and Luis Dávila to provide a much-needed outlet for the creative work of young Hispanic writers, who were not yet picked up by the mainstream press, including Lorna Dee Cervantes, Sandra Cisneros, Giannina Braschi, Gary Soto, Luis Raphael Sanchez, and Ana Castillo.

1980s

- This Bridge Called My Back: Writings by Radical Women of Color is a feminist anthology edited by leaders of Chicana literature, Cherríe Moraga and Gloria E. Anzaldúa. First published in 1981 by Persephone Press, the work included Latina authors who wrote in Spanish and Spanglish, among others.
- La ciudad prestada poesía latinoamericana posmoderna en Nueva York edited by Pedro López Adorno featured early works by Postmodern Latino/a/x authors.

1990s

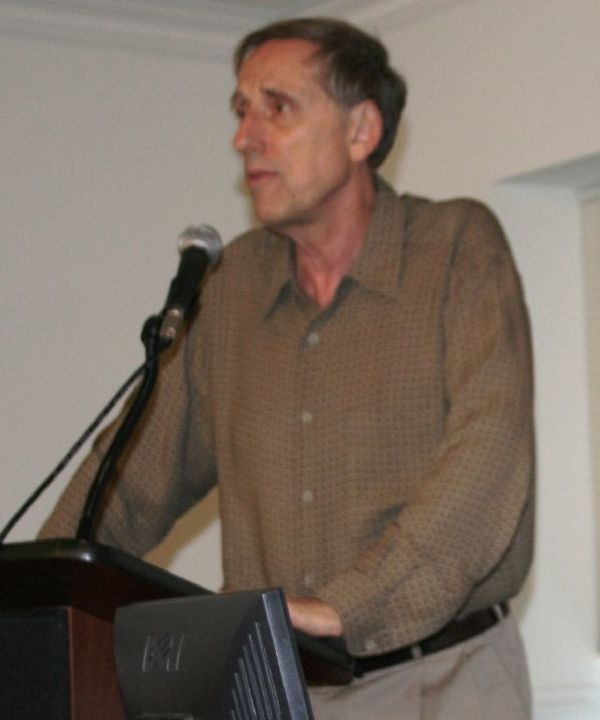
Ariel Dorfman professor of literature and Latin American Studies at Duke University.

- Floricanto Si!: A Collection of Latina Poetry co-edited by Bryce Milligan and Angela de Hoyos featured lyrical and prose poems by Marjorie Agosin, Julia Alvarez, Giannina Braschi, Anna Castillo, Sandra Cisneros, Rosario Ferre, Carmen Gimenez Smith, Lucha Corpi, and Lorna Dee Cervantes, among others. Select poems were written in Spanish or used Spanglish. (Penguin, 1998)

=== 2000s ===
- Se habla español: Voces Latinas in the US (2000). McOndo authors Edmundo Paz Soldan and Alberto Fuguet co-edited this anthology of short stories in Spanish by Iván Thays (Peru), Ignacio Padilla (Mexico), Jorge Volpi (Mexico), Junot Díaz (Dominican-American), Alvaro Enrigue (Mexico), Silvana Paternostro (Colombia), Mayra Santos-Febres (Puerto Rico), Ilan Stavans (Mexico), Lina Meruane (Chile), Rodrigo Rey Rosa (Guatemala), Ángel Lozada (Puerto Rico), and Giannina Braschi (Puerto Rico). The anthology marked the New Latino Boom of Spanish writing in the United States.

2010 to 2020

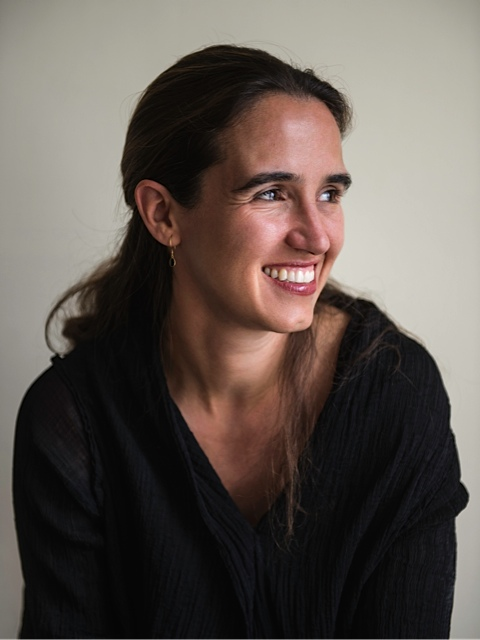
Lorea Canales is considered an author of modern global literature.

- The Norton Anthology of Latino Literature, a 2,700-page compendium that includes two hundred authors from the colonial period (the earliest author included is Fray Bartolomé de las Casas) to the present time. Among the featured writers are: Daniel Alarcón, Julia Alvarez, Giannina Braschi, Julia de Burgos, Fray Bartolomé de las Casas, Junot Díaz, Cristina García (journalist), Oscar Hijuelos, José Martí, Octavio Paz, Rolando Pérez (Cuban poet), Esmeralda Santiago, and William Carlos Williams.
- The FSG Book of Latin American Poetry, (2011) a 728-page volume that contextualizes the history of Latin American poets including those who migrated to the US. Featured poets: José Martí, Rubén Darío, César Vallejo, Oswald de Andrade, Pablo Neruda, Violeta Parra, Nicanor Parra, Gabriela Mistral, Luis Palés Matos, Octavio Paz, Giannina Braschi, and Roberto Bolaño.
- Abriendo Caminos/Breaking Ground: Anthology of Puerto Rican Women Writers in New York 1980-2012 edited by Myrna Nieves. Featured poets: Giannina Braschi and Sandra María Esteves.
- Crisis by Jorge Majfud is one of contemporary classics of the new Latino literature.
- Escribir en Nueva York (2014) edited by Claudia Salazar. This is an anthology of Hispanic American, Latino/a, and Latinx narrators who have lived in New York and written stories in Spanish. It was published in Spanish and includes short stories by: Carmen Boullosa, Lorea Canales (México), Giannina Braschi (Puerto Rico), Sergio Chejfec, Federico Falco, Sylvia Molloy (Argentina), Isaac Goldemberg (Perú), Mónica Ríos, Carlos Labbé, Diamela Eltit (Chile), Jaime Manrique (Colombia), and José Manuel Prieto (Cuba).

== Latino authors ==
U.S. based authors who write and publish stories, poetry, novels, or theater in Spanish include:

- Giannina Braschi
- Ariel Dorfman
- Isabel Allende
- Jorge Majfud
- Junot Díaz
- Mayra Santos-Febres
- René Marqués
- Lina Meruane
- Manuel Ramos Otero
- Pedro Pietri
- Miguel Piñero
- Reinaldo Arenas
- Tomás Eloy Martínez
- Rolando Hinojosa-Smith
- Tomás Rivera
- Ilan Stavans
- Miguel Méndez
- Daína Chaviano
- Carlos Labbé
- Marco Katz

== US publishers of Spanish language books ==
- Latin American Literary Review Press
- Bilingual Review Press
- Alfaguara USA
- Artepoética Press
- AmazonCrossing
- Arte Público Press
- Floricanto Press
- Jade Publishing
- Restless Books
- Random House Español
- Sangría
- Sudaquia Editores
- HarperCollins's Rayo
- Harlequin Bianca and Harlequin Deseo

== Spanish bookstores in the US ==
- LA Libreria
- Lectorum
- Libros in Español
- Libreria Barco De Papel
- Libreria Giron
- Libreria Tesoros
- Tertulia

== See also ==
- Puerto Rican literature
- Spanish language in the United States
- Spanish-language literature
- Spanglish
- Chicano literature
- Chicano poetry
- Nuyorican
- Hispanic and Latino literature
- Latino literature
- Latino poetry
