= Nuria Morgado =

Spanish Hispanic studies professor

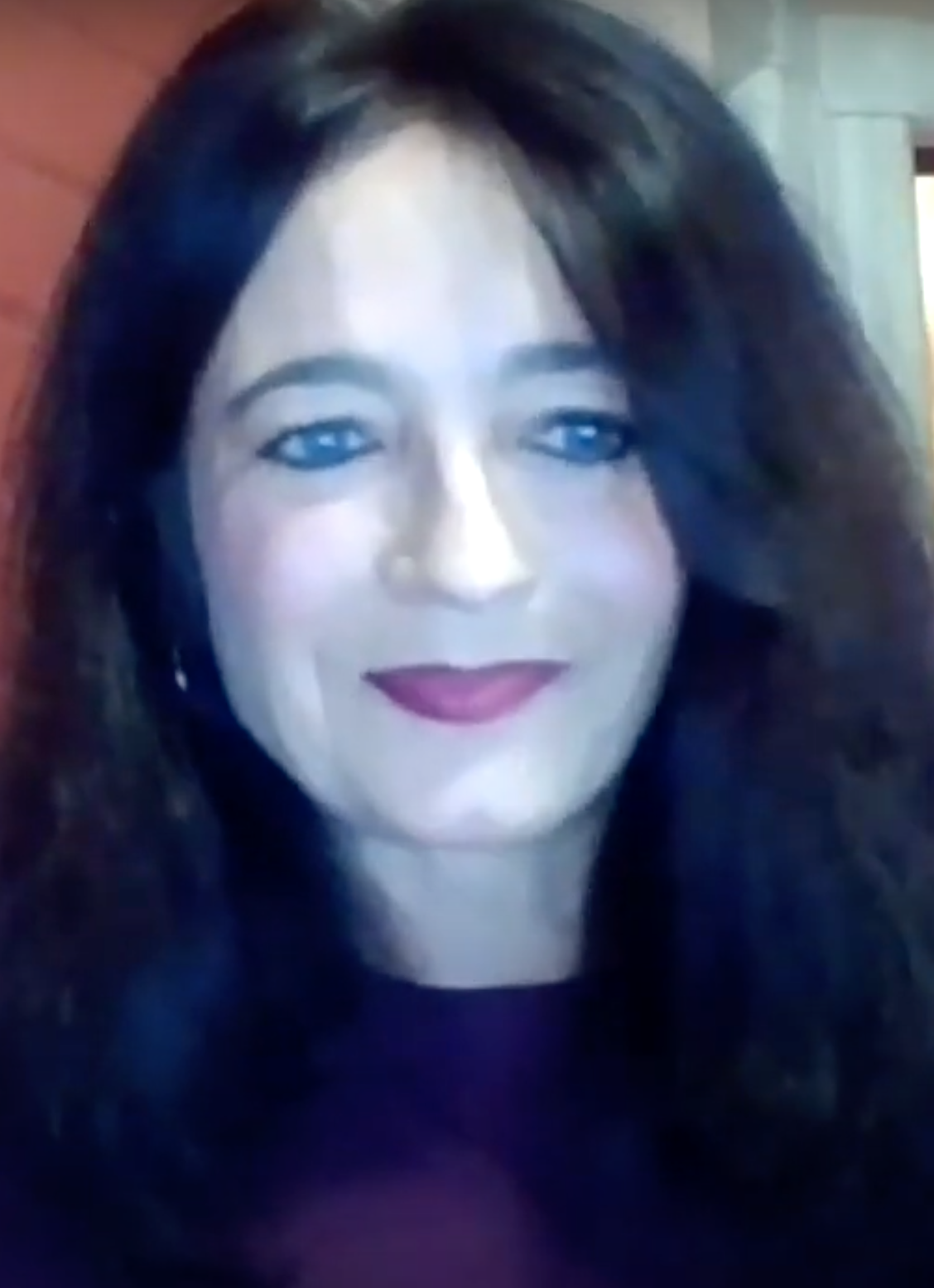
- Morgado in 2021
- Born: Barcelona, Spain

Academic background
- Education: Autonomous University of Barcelona; University of Arizona

Academic work
- Discipline: Hispanic studies
- Institutions: College of Staten Island; CUNY Graduate Center

Nuria Morgado is a Spanish academic and professor of Hispanic studies at the College of Staten Island and CUNY Graduate Center. Her work focuses on modern and contemporary Hispanic literature, cultural studies, and the intersections of literature, culture, and philosophy.

== Early life and education ==
Nuria Morgado was born in Barcelona. She earned a degree in information sciences from the Autonomous University of Barcelona (UAB) in 1991. She obtained a Ph.D. in Peninsular and Latin American Literature from the University of Arizona.

== Career ==
Morgado is a professor of Hispanic studies at the College of Staten Island and City University of New York (CUNY) Graduate Center. Her research focuses on modern and contemporary Hispanic literature, cultural studies, comparative literature, and the intersections between literature, culture, and philosophy.

Morgado has authored and edited several books and academic articles. In 2017, she was inducted into the North American Academy of the Spanish Language (ANLE) after delivering a lecture on the philosophical themes in Antonio Machado's poetry. In 2024, she became the director of ANLE.

Her editorial roles include serving as editor-in-chief of Boletín de la Academia Norteamericana de la Lengua Española and book review editor of the Arizona Journal of Hispanic Cultural Studies. She co-founded Letras Hispanas: Revista de Literatura y Cultura, a journal focused on Hispanic literature and culture. Morgado is also a member of the academic committee of the Miguel Delibes Chair, an initiative between CUNY and the University of Valladolid, and she is a correspondent of the Royal Spanish Academy (RAE).

== Awards/Honors ==
Former President of Ecuador Rosalía Arteaga of the Glocal Women Foundation named Nuria Morgado "Woman of the Year 2025" along with other cultural figures including Mexican novelist Carmen Boullosa, Puerto Rican poet Giannina Braschi, Chilean artist Cecilia Vicuña".
