= José Vicente Anaya =

Mexican poet (1947–2020)

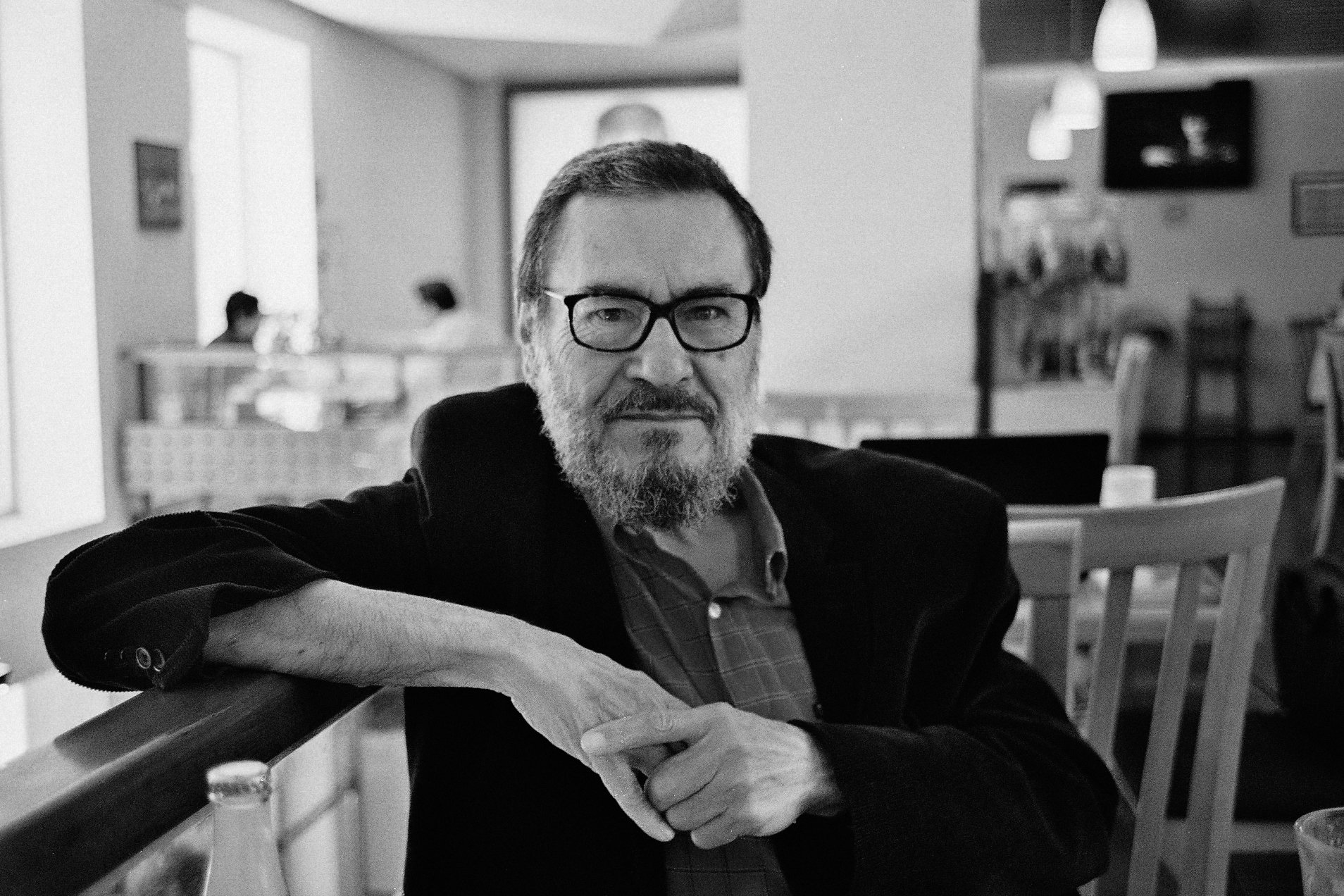
- Born: January 22, 1947; Villa Coronado, Chihuahua, Mexico
- Died: August 1, 2020 (aged 73); Mexico City, Mexico
- Education: National Autonomous University of Mexico
- Occupation(s): Writer, poet, cultural journalist

José Vicente Anaya (January 22, 1947 – August 1, 2020) was a Mexican writer, poet and cultural journalist.

Anaya was born on January 22, 1947, in Villa Coronado, Chihuahua, Mexico. He wrote over thirty books and was part of the Infrarealism poetry movement in Mexico City. He also translated poems of Allen Ginsberg and Carl Sandburg.

Anaya died on August 1, 2020, in Mexico City, aged 73.
