= Federico Falco =

Federico Falco may refer to:

- Federico Falco (writer)
- Federico Falco (table tennis)
