= Javiera Díaz de Valdés =

Chilean actress (born 1981)

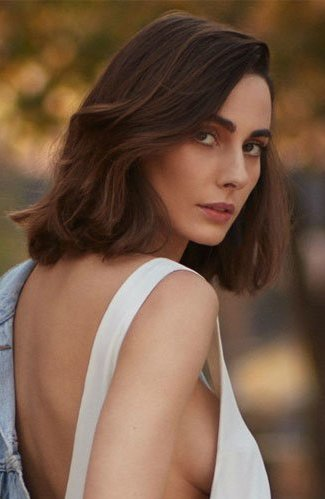
- Díaz de Valdes in 2014
- Born: Javiera Díaz de Valdés Alemparte; June 30, 1981 (age 45); Santiago de Chile
- Occupations: Actress; model

Javiera Díaz de Valdés Alemparte (born 30 June 1981 in Santiago), is a Chilean television actress best known for her role in the telenovela Gatas y Tuercas. She is a descendant of Javiera Carrera, a Chilean patriot of Basque descent who was married to the Spaniard Pedro Díaz de Valdés.

Díaz de Valdés was a model for the Elite modeling agency. She made her acting debut in the film Sexo con Amor. She appeared in the telenovelas Gatas y Tuercas (2005), Charly Tango (2006) and Mujeres de Lujo (2009–2010).

== Personal life ==
In 2006, Díaz de Valdés married poet and television presenter Pablo Mackenna, and in 2008 their first child, Rosa, was born. They ended their relationship in 2009.

== Filmography ==
=== Films ===
Year	Film	Role	Notes
2023	El vacío	Her	
2008	Divine, la película		
2007	Scrambled Beer	Rocío	
2005	Se Arrienda	Catalina	
2003	Sexo con Amor	Susan	Best known role.

=== Telenovela ===
Year	Telenovela	Role	Notes
2010	Primera Dama	Luciana Cuadra	
2009–2010	Mujeres de Lujo	Isidora Baeza / Rubí	
2009	Mundos Paralelos		TV series
2007	Héroes	Mercedes Fontecilla	TV miniseries
2007	Vivir con 10	Estela Elgueta	
2006	Charly Tango	Isabel Marambio	
2005–2006	Gatas y tuercas	Europa San Juan	
2003	La Vida es una Lotería	Isabel	TV series
