= Elsa Cross =

Spanish-language Mexican writer (born 1946)

Elsa María Cross Anzaldúa
- Born: March 6, 1946 (age 80)
- Education: Universidad Nacional Autónoma de México
- Occupations: Writer, poet
- Spouse(s): Alejandro Aura; Juan Tovar
- Children: 2
- Writing career
- Language: Spanish
- Notable awards: Xavier Villaurrutia Award 2007; National Prize for Arts 2016

Elsa María Cross Anzaldúa (born March 6, 1946), known professionally as Elsa Cross, is a contemporary Spanish-language Mexican writer and poet.

== Biography ==
Cross was born in Mexico City on March 6, 1946. She has a doctorate in Philosophy and Letters from Universidad Nacional Autónoma de México (UNAM) and is currently a professor in that Faculty. Cross is a researcher in Indian philosophy, philosophy of religion, comparative mythology, Indian poetry, and Indian art. He studied Hindu philosophy in India, where he lived for two years, and in the United States.

She has also published translations, philosophical essays and is known as an authority on Indian philosophy.

According to Octavio Paz, Elsa Cross is one of the most personal voices in recent Latin-American poetry. Her work, already considerable, includes some of the most perfect poems of the last generation of Mexican writers. I say voice and not poetic writing since poetry, although written, must always be spoken. Two opposing notes reconcile harmoniously in Elsa Cross: the complexity of her thought and the clarity of her diction.

Speaking of her poetry, Cross said it is the bond of the internal with the external. In one direction or another, for me poetry always bridges that inside with that of the outside, is the way of passing from one to the other of these spaces, but which unites them. The internal only can expressed when reflected in that outside -that necessary knot-, the outside can be a mirror or vice versa.

== Awards ==
In 1989, she was awarded the Premio Nacional de Poesía Aguascalientes for her book of poems El diván de Antar. In 1992 she was given the Jaime Sabines International Poetry Prize, for her book Moira.

In 2007 she received the Xavier Villaurrutia Award. That same year, she won the Jaime Sabines-Gatien Lapointe International Poetry Prize.

In 2016, Cross was awarded the National Prize for Arts in the Linguistics and literature category.

In 2023, she was the recipient of the Alfonso Reyes International Prize.

== Personal life ==
She was briefly married to the poet Alejandro Aura, and later in life to the playwright Juan Tovar. She has two children, one with each of her husbands.

== Selected published works ==
- Naxos, Ollín, México, UFSIA: MAG-MEX-B 7813, (1966)
- Amor el más oscuro (1969)
- Peach Melba, Sierra Madre, Series: Poesía en el mundo, (1970)
- La dama de la torre, entitled La canción de Arnaut, Joaquín Mortiz, México, (poetry prize in the concurso nacional de la juventud 1971, 1972), (1972)
- Canto por un equinoccio de Saint John Perse, Cuadernos de Humanidades, UNAM-INBA, (1980)
- Tres poemas (Colección Cuadernos de poesía), UNAM, ISBN 978-968-5800-91-4, (1981)
- Bacantes/Bacchae, Artífice Ediciones, México, ISBN 978-968-6654-05-9, (1982)
- La realidad transfigurada en torno a las ideas del joven Nietzche, UNAM, (1985)
- Canto malabar, Fondo de Cultura Económica, ISBN 978-968-16-2679-2, (1987)
- Pasaje de fuego, D.F., Boldó i Climent, México, 2 ed., ISBN 978-968-6109-16-0, (1987)
- Espejo al sol (poemas 1964-1981), Secretaría de Educación Pública, ISBN 978-968-29-2057-8, (1989)
- El diván de Antar, JM, ISBN 978-968-27-0390-4, (1990) – Aguascalientes National Poetry Prize winner
- Jaguar, Ediciones Toledo, México, ISBN 978-968-6332-24-7, (1991)
- El himno de las ranas, Lectorum Pubns (Juv), ISBN 978-968-494-052-9, (1992)
- Casuarinas (El ala del tigre), UNAM, Coordinación de Humanidades, Dirección General de Publicaciones, ISBN 978-968-36-2020-0, (1992)
- Moira, Gobierno del Estado, Instituto Chiapaneco de Cultura, ISBN 978-968-6492-87-3, (1993) – Jaime Sabines International Poetry Prize winner
- Poemas de la India, UNAM, (1993)
- Urracas, Editorial Aldus, ISBN 978-968-6830-45-3, (1995)
- De lejos viene, de lejos va llegando, Biblioteca del ISSSTE, ISBN 978-968-825-350-2, (1999)
- Los sueños. Elegías, Conaculta, México, Práctica Mortal, ISBN 978-970-18-3990-4, (2000)
- Poemas escogidos 1965-1999, UNAM, ISBN 978-968-36-8018-1, (2000)
- Ultramar (Letras Mexicanas), Fondo De Cultura Economica USA, ISBN 978-968-16-6562-3, (2002)
- Los DOS Jardines: Mistica y Erotismo En Algunos Poetas Mexicanos (La Centena), Ediciones Sin Nombre, ISBN 978-970-35-0291-2, (2003)
- El vino de las cosas: ditirambos, Conaculta, México, ISBN 978-968-411-588-0, (2004)
