= Mario Santiago Papasquiaro =

Mexican poet (1953–1998)

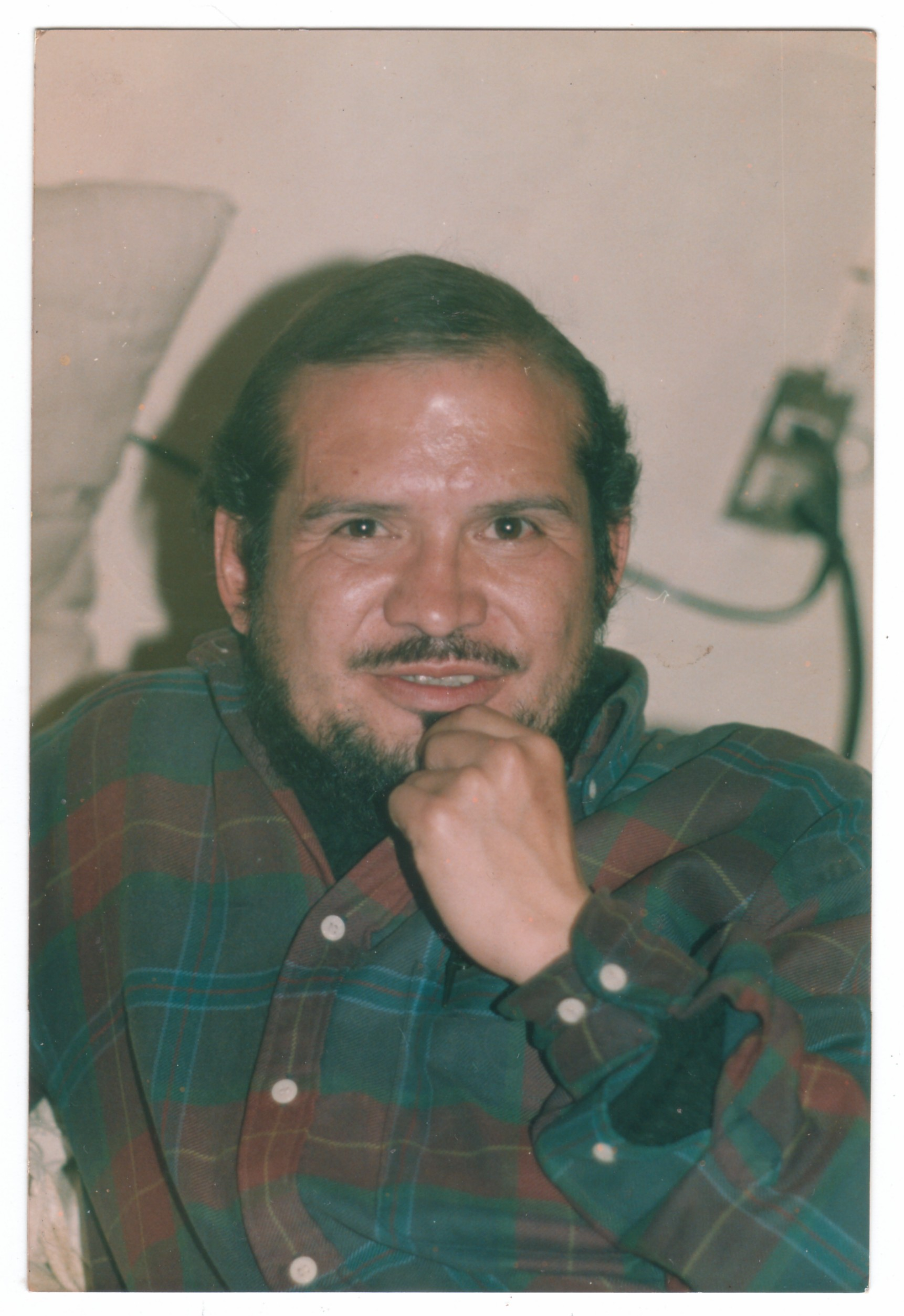
- Born: José Alfredo Zendejas Pineda; December 25, 1953; Mexico City, Mexico
- Died: January 10, 1998 (aged 44); Mexico City, Mexico
- Occupation: Poet
- Writing career
- Period: 1972–1998
- Literary movement: Infrarrealismo

Mario Santiago Papasquiaro is the pen name of José Alfredo Zendejas Pineda (Mexico City, December 25, 1953–1998), Mexican poet and co-founder of the infrarrealista poetry movement.

== Biography ==
Papasquiaro was born in 1953 in Mexico City.

Papasquiaro's first reading was at the Museo Nacional de San Carlos in 1973. In 1976, he founded the Infrarrealismo (Infrarealism) movement along with Roberto Bolaño, Cuauhtémoc Méndez Estrada, Ramón Méndez Estrada, Bruno Montané, Rubén Medina, Juan Esteban Harrington, Óscar Altamirano, José Peguero, Guadalupe Ochoa, José Vicente Anaya, Pedro Damián Bautista, and Mara Larrosa.

Santiago inspired the character of Ulises Lima in fellow infrarealist Roberto Bolaño's novel The Savage Detectives. Like Santiago, the Lima character is an eccentric adventurer, and an opponent of the traditional forms of writers who sold out for state scholarships. Santiago frequently made enemies due to his sincerity and open criticism of what he deemed inferior forms of poetry, the literary elite, and poets themselves. He has gained slight recognition, though he is recognized and lauded by the recorded oral testimonies of his "comrades-in-arms".

He died after being hit by a motorist on January 10, 1998, in Mexico City.

== Works ==
His poems were collected in Aullido de cisne, published in 1996. The last poem he wrote was EME ESE PE, published in La Jornada newspaper days before his death.

Santiago is considered by many to be the principal exponent and purest stylistic representative of the infrarealism movement, a vanguard literary movement representing a rupture with the Mexican literary establishment. His poems are complex, erudite, and highly metaphorical. Santiago sought an aesthetic of signs, much like the calligrams of Guillaume Apollinaire. The majority of his work is still unpublished.
