= Piri Thomas =

Puerto Rican-Cuban poet

- Born: Juan Pedro Tomas; 30 September 1928; New York City, New York
- Died: 17 October 2011 (aged 83); El Cerrito, California
- Writing career
- Genre: autobiography
- Notable works: Down These Mean Streets, Amigo Brothers
- Literary movement: Nuyorican

Piri Thomas (born Juan Pedro Tomas; September 30, 1928 – October 17, 2011) was an American writer and poet of Puerto Rican-Cuban descent, whose memoir Down These Mean Streets became a best-seller.

== Early years ==
Thomas was born to a Puerto Rican mother and Cuban father. His childhood neighborhood in the Spanish Harlem section of New York City was riddled with crime and violence. According to Thomas, children were expected to be gang members at a young age, and Thomas was no exception. Thomas was also exposed to racial discrimination because of his Afro-Latino heritage. As an Afro-Latino man, Piri Thomas not only experienced racial discrimination based on his complexion within his neighborhood, but also within the ingrained colorism in his household. Thomas was born during the great depression, his family experienced its hardships, especially his father. His father felt that he needed to provide for his family and would bounce from job to job. Thomas's father seemed to not treat him the same as his siblings due to his darker skin tone. His mother on the other hand treated Thomas and his siblings equally. As a matter of fact, it is alluded in Down These Mean Streets, that his mother had a soft spot for Piri. At home she would bring them much comfort. On a few occasions Thomas would get into fights and this would cause his family much grief. Thomas was involved with drugs, gang warfare and crime. He became addicted to heroin. While spending seven years in prison for an attempted armed robbery, Thomas reflected on the teachings of his mother and father, and realized that a person is not born a criminal. Consequently, he decided to use his street and prison know-how to reach at-risk youth, and to help them avoid a life of crime.

== Down These Mean Streets ==
In 1967, Thomas received funds from the Rabinowitz Foundation to write and publish his best-selling autobiography Down These Mean Streets. The book describes his struggle for survival as a Puerto Rican/Cuban born and raised in the barrios of New York. The autobiography explains Thomas's journey of figuring out his identity. It takes readers on a deep dive into his life and how he navigates the struggles he encounters from being Afro-Latino. The book challenged racism and racial thinking in the 1940s. Thomas would address the racism in his family and would claim his black heritage throughout the memoir. In addition, the book points out key narratives on democracy and racial supremacy. The book, which has been in print for 52 years, was banned in some places but also required reading, depending on the time and place. He narrated the rampant racism of the pre-Civil Rights Act of 1964. His other works include Savior, Savior Hold My Hand; Seven Long Times; and Stories from El Barrio. with el primo

One of his most known works is the chapter in Down These Mean Streets called Brothers Under the Skin. In this chapter, Piri Thomas brings light to an altercation between himself and his brother in which they argued about their race. Piri's brother, Jose, is adamant about being only Puerto Rican and white. While Piri is able to acknowledge that he has black ancestry and is willing to go "down south" to learn more about his culture. The brothers go back and forth on the topic about their race and end up physically hurting one another. Both their parents seem to deny the fact that they have Black heritage as well and Piri's mother believes that he does not like to be "un negrito".

== Savior, Savior, Hold My Hand ==
In 1972, Thomas published Savior, Savior, Hold My Hand. Thomas describes matters regarding faith, vulnerability, and seeking guidance throughout life. Thomas, delving into his own personal experiences, recounts how he chose to lead his life after being released from prison. The book follows Thomas as he converts to Christianity, helps inner-city youth, finds job employment, and how he gets married. This book serves as a plea from Thomas himself to a higher power as he has a desire to change his life.

Those who critique Savior, Savior, Hold My Hand reference how this book lacks Thomas' emotionality from his first book, Down These Mean Streets.

== Later years ==
Thomas was an influential precursor to the Nuyorican Movement which included poets Pedro Pietri, Miguel Algarín, and Giannina Braschi, who wrote of life in New York City using a mix of English and Spanish. Thomas worked on a book titled A Matter of Dignity and on an educational film entitled Dialogue with Society.

Thomas traveled around the U.S., Central America and Europe, giving lectures and conducting workshops in colleges and universities. In 1968, Gordon Parks filmed a documentary titled The World of Piri Thomas. In 2003, Jonathan Meyer Robinson made a film Every Child is Born a Poet: The Life and Work of Piri Thomas, which featured a soundtrack by Kip Hanrahan.

On October 17, 2011, Thomas died from pneumonia at his home in El Cerrito, California. He was survived by his wife Suzie Dod Thomas, six children, and three stepchildren.

== See also ==
- Nuyorican
- List of Puerto Ricans
- List of Puerto Rican writers
- Puerto Rican literature
- List of Cuban American writers
- List of Cuban Americans
- American Literature in Spanish
- Latino literature
