= El vacío =

- Theatrical release poster
- Directed by: Gustavo Graef-Marino
- Written by: Gustavo Graef-Marino
- Produced by: Gustavo Graef-Marino
- Starring: Francisco Reyes Morandé; Javiera Díaz de Valdés
- Cinematography: Pepe Torres
- Edited by: Camilo Campi
- Production company: Passport Films
- Release date: June 8, 2023
- Running time: 97 minutes
- Country: Chile
- Language: Spanish

El vacío (lit. 'The void') is a 2023 Chilean romantic drama film written, directed and produced by Gustavo Graef-Marino. Starring Francisco Reyes Morandé and Javiera Díaz de Valdés. It premiered on June 8, 2023, in Chilean theaters.

== Synopsis ==
A filmmaker living off his past success decides to give romance a try, but the perfect love story is threatened by the intense emptiness inside them.

== Cast ==
- Francisco Reyes Morandé as him
- Javiera Díaz de Valdés as her
- Aída Caballero as daughter
- Emilia Noguera
- Benjamín Gallo
