= Pablo Mackenna =

Chilean television presenter, poet (born 1969)

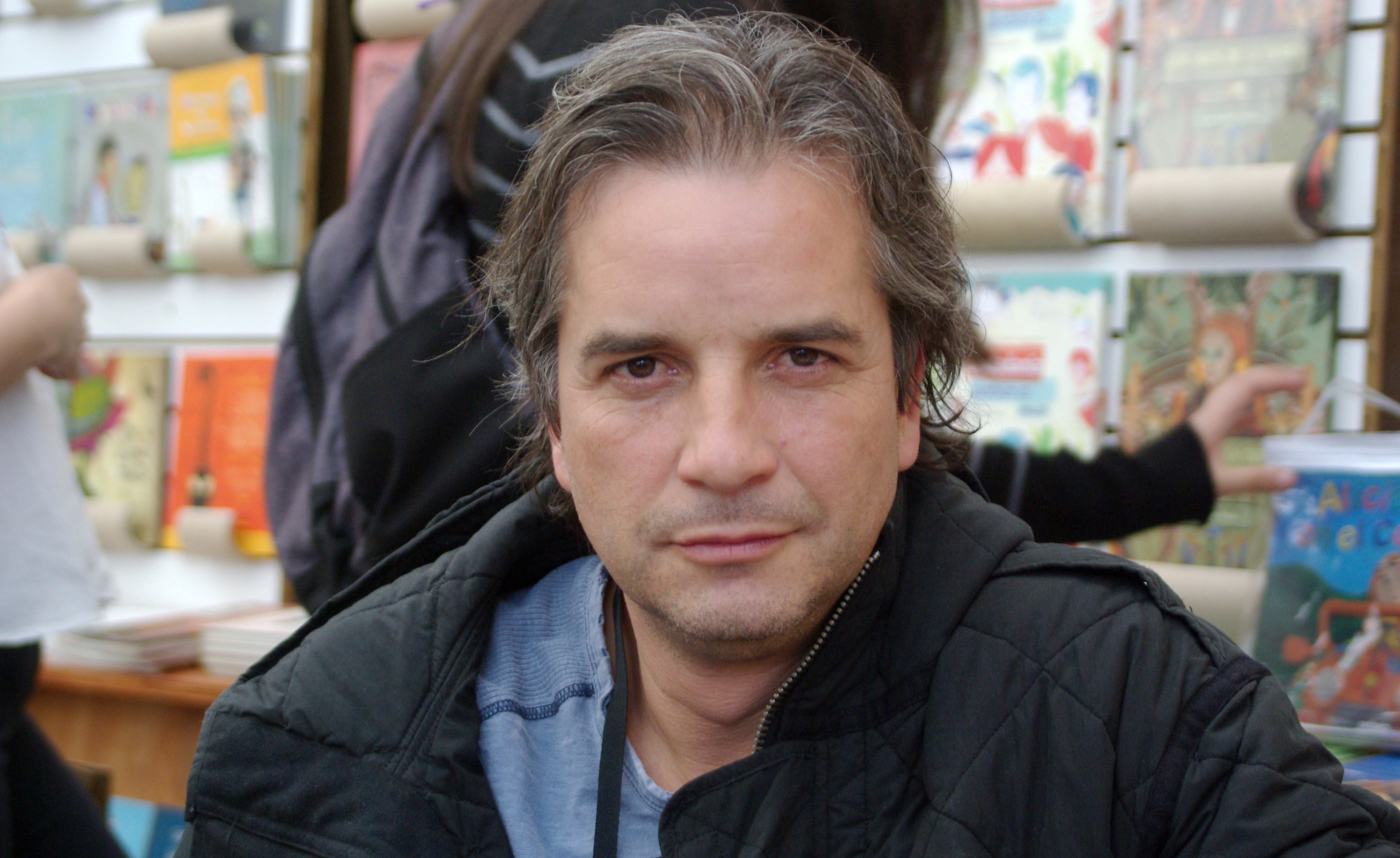
- Mackenna in 2015
- Born: Pablo Mackenna Dörr; May 30, 1969 (age 57); Santiago de Chile, Chile
- Education: Pontifical Catholic University of Chile and Heidelberg University
- Occupations: Television presenter, poet

Pablo Mackenna Dörr (born May 30, 1969) is a Chilean television presenter and poet. He was a host of the Chilean version of comedy and news television show Caiga Quien Caiga.

== Earky life and education ==
Mackenna was born in Santiago, the son of the businessman Luis Fernando Mackenna Echaurren, of Irish descent and María Teresa Dörr Zegers, of German descent. He is the third of eight children.

He studied at the Colegio Tabancura school and later studied economy at the Pontifical Catholic University of Chile (in Santiago) and philosophy at Heidelberg University (in Germany).

== Career ==
In 1994, Mackenna worked at the Santiago Stock Exchange (Bolsa de Comercio de Santiago).

He began his television career in 2002, hosting the Chilean version of the television show Caiga Quien Caiga. In 2007, he was a host of the television show La Liga along with Rafael Cavada, Blanca Lewin and Roka Valbuena.

In 2008, with the journalist Felipe Bianchi, Mackenna animated a radio talk show Vueltas del Universo by Radio Universo. In 2009, he was a host, with Raquel Argandoña, of the reality show 1910.

== Personal life ==
In 2006, Mackenna married actress Javiera Díaz de Valdés and in 2008 their first child, Rosa, was born. During 2009, they finished their relationship.

In 2006, Mackenna published his book Cuarenta noches.
