= Scrambled Beer =

- Theatrical release poster
- Directed by: Cristóbal Valderrama
- Written by: Cristóbal Valderrama; Carlos Labbé
- Produced by: Margarita Ortega
- Starring: Diego Muñoz; Nicolás Saavedra
- Cinematography: Jorge González Vasquez
- Edited by: María Teresa Viera-Gallo
- Music by: Cristián Schmidt
- Production companies: Cinepata; Forma Producciones
- Distributed by: BF Distribution
- Release dates: March 10, 2007 (SXSW); September 6, 2007 (Chile)
- Running time: 88 minutes
- Country: Chile
- Language: Spanish

Scrambled Beer (Spanish: Malta con huevo, lit. 'Malt with egg') is a 2007 Chilean science fiction comedy film directed by Cristóbal Valderrama (in his directorial debut) and written by Valderrama & Carlos Labbé. Starring Diego Muñoz and Nicolás Saavedra accompanied by Javiera Díaz de Valdés and Manuela Martelli.

== Synopsis ==
Two friends are going to live together. One of them -Vladimir- a nice, lazy and profiteering sculptor believes he is traveling through time. He goes to sleep on the day of the move and wakes up two weeks later, sleeping with his friend's girlfriend. Going back to sleep, wake up a week earlier, when a lot hasn't happened yet. The other friend -Jorge- is convinced that he has a superior mentality and to prove it he has decided to use Vladimir as his guinea pig.

== Cast ==
The actors participating in this film are:

- Diego Muñoz as Vladimir
- Nicolás Saavedra as Jorge
- Javiera Díaz de Valdés as Rocio
- Manuela Martelli as Fedora
- Patricio Díaz as Grandote
- Mariana Derderián as Mónica
- Aline Küppenheim as Bárbara
- Alejandra Vega as Bar Waitress
- Cristina Peña y Lillo as Grandote's Girlfriend
- Rodrigo Salinas as Grandote's Cousin 1
- Álvaro Salinas as Grandote's Cousin 2
- Camilo Torres as Pedro
- Lucia Baeza as Fedora's Grandmother
- Isolda Cid as Fedora's Other Grandmother
- Clemente Echavarry as Child Jorge
- Paula Bravo as TV Fedora Murderer
- Javiera Hernández as TV Fedora Victim
- Francisco González Hermosilla as Taxi Driver

== Production ==
Principal photography began on April 4, 2006, in Chile.

== Release ==
Scrambled Beer had its world premiere on March 10, 2007, at the South by Southwest Film Festival, then it was screened in mid-August of the same year at the 3rd Santiago International Film Festival. It was commercially released on September 6, 2007, in Chilean theaters.

== Reception ==
=== Box-office ===
In its first week on the billboard, it debuted in third place, attracting 10,143 viewers. In its second week, the film came in third place grossing $32,208. For its third week, it again ranked third reaching 27,431 viewers. After 10 weeks on the billboard, it caught a total of 38,417 viewers, collecting $90,611,892 Chilean pesos, becoming the fifth most successful national film of that year.

=== Accolades ===
Year	Award / Festival	Category	Recipient	Result	Ref.
2007	Film Festival of the North of Chile	Audience Award	Scrambled Beer	Won	
2008	Pedro Sienna Awards	Best Director	Cristóbal Valderrama	Nominated	
2008	Pedro Sienna Awards	Best Screenplay	Cristóbal Valderrama & Carlos Labbé	Won	
2008	Pedro Sienna Awards	Best Soundtrack	Cristián Mascaró Libélula	Nominated	
2008	Pedro Sienna Awards	Best Art Direction	Constanza Meza-Lopehandía	Nominated	
2008	Pedro Sienna Awards	Best Makeup	Marcela Zamorano	Nominated	
2008	Pedro Sienna Awards	Best Special Effects	Juan Pablo Aliaga	Nominated	
