= Luis Alberto Ambroggio =

American poet

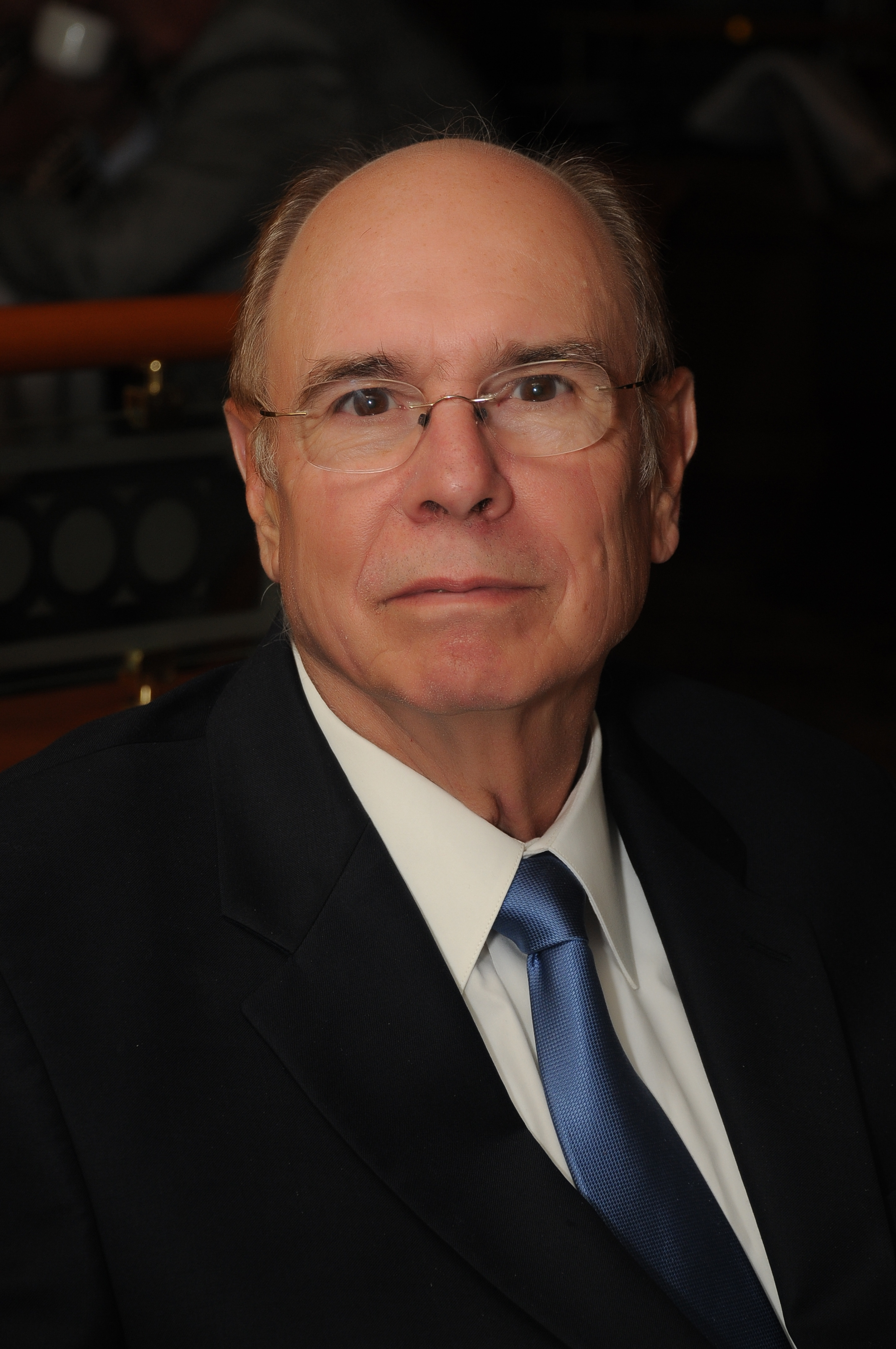
- A photo of Luis Alberto Ambroggio, 2012.
- Born: 11 November 1945 (age 80); Cordoba, Argentina

Luis Alberto Ambroggio (Córdoba, Argentina, 1945) is an Argentine American poet, independent scholar and writer. Full Member of the North American Academy of the Spanish Language (Academia Norteamericana de la Lengua Española) and correspondent of the Spanish Royal Academy (Real Academia Española). His works include essays, poetry and translations.

His poems have been translated into English, French, Italian, Rumanian, Mandarin, Korean, Catalan, Hebrew, Portuguese, Japanese, Turkish and are recorded in the Archives of the Hispanic-American Literature of the U.S. Library of Congress.

== Early life and education ==
Born in Rio Tercero (Ctalamochita, its Indian name), between the Pampas and the mountains of the province of Cordoba, Argentina, Luis Alberto Ambroggio is the son of Dr. Ernesto Pedro Ambroggio, dentist, founder of one of the first institutes of Orthodontics in Cordoba and Perla Lutereau de Ambroggio, philosophy professor at the National and Catholic Universities of Cordoba, a "recognized and feared teacher, anti-dictatorship, who was expelled from the campus by mounted police, a woman of deep faith and at the same time admirer of Nietzsche, she certainly has had a decisive influence on the personality and calling of her son." He attended primary school in Cordoba and high school in Rosario. Before the age of fifteen he had written poems and won poetry contests. His mother, noticing this ability, gave him an anthology of César Vallejo; this would mark the beginning of his career in poetry.

=== College ===
During his college years he continued his interest in Plato, Aristotle, Augustine of Hippo and then he was attracted by the writings of Racine, Voltaire, Kant, and Nietzsche. Hence, his first publication was a philosophical textbook of epistemology written in collaboration with his mother. Today his philosophical readings are more inclined to the thoughts of Ricoeur and Wittgenstein. In Argentina, he received his doctoral degree in philosophy and completed other doctoral studies in social science at The Catholic University of America. He also has an MBA from Virginia Tech.

== Career ==
He came to the United States in 1967. Under the Leadership Program of the United Nations, he served as an intern in the U.S. Congress and then on the White House Cabinet Committee for the advancement of the Hispanic population during the Nixon administration. He also worked at the Pan American Development Foundation and at the Embassy of Argentina in Washington, DC.

In 1976 Ambroggio founded the company, Aerospace International Marketing (AIM), which he sold in 2001 and would continue as the Chief Advisor to the Board until 2008.

=== Academic work and writing ===
Ambroggio has given recitals and lectures at over 30 universities. As a member of the faculty of the University of Massachusetts Amherst and Florida Gulf Coast University, Ambroggio has taught seminars and lectured on various topics including the art of writing poetry. He has translated poems by William Carlos Williams, DH Lawrence, Dylan Thomas and Robert Pinsky. He has published twenty books of poetry, four of which are bilingual, a book on the art of writing poetry, a collection of short stories, and a book of essays.

== Style and critical reception ==
Ambroggio writes in various genres: poetry, essays, stories that he keeps in notebooks. In some of his poems he reflects different stages of his life: agnostic, socially committed, loving, a period of exile. In If Dawn Comes: War Songs (Por si amanece: cantos de Guerra) he interprets the theme of violence in war while at the same time emphasizing the culture of peace. In Poems of Loving and Living (Poemas de amor y vida) he incorporates what he calls "a multifaceted love" of son, father, husband. Amateur aviator in Air Man (Hombre del Aire), from an airplane, he meditates on the volatility and the contradictions of existence.

Influenced by F. Nietzsche, César Vallejo, Jorge Luis Borges, Vicente Aleixandre, his poetry has been described by Pulitzer-prize winner Oscar Hijuelos as:

wise and philosophical. It owns an inimitable cadence, uncommon good sense, and a smoldering depth—for there is fire in Ambroggio's blueness, an earthy eroticism in his lyric register.

According to Gerardo Piña-Rosales, Director of the North-American Academy of the Spanish Language, Ambroggio's work reflects a tradition of Hispanic literature and culture. Poet Laureate Robert Pinsky "the essential quality of Luis Alberto Ambroggio's poetry is immediacy: the vividness of images..." Adriana Corda states "Luis Alberto Ambroggio chooses an invisible power, without land nor identity, as a symbol of a deep cultural malaise at a collective level and responsible for refracting the dantesque domaines at the individual level; he parodizes, he shows the irony, he accuses, he limits ..."

== Awards and honors ==
- He is a member of the North-American Academy of Spanish Language and of the Royal Spanish Academy, Chairman of the Delegation of the American Academy of the Spanish Language in Washington DC, Director of the Ibero-American Academy of Poetry, State Department Cultural Envoy to Nicaragua and El Salvador, Curator of the Smithsonian Institution for literary events, Member Emeritus of the Venezuelan Writers Circle, Deputy Chairman Founder and Honorary Member of the United Nations of the Letters, President of the Poetry and Policy Committee, Vice President of the World Council of Spanish-American Union of Writers, Consul at the World Poets Movement in Washington DC and a member of institutions such as the Academy of American Poets, Canadian Association of Spanish scholars, PEN, Hispanic Literary Cultural Institute; board member of the Plaza Institute, Washington DC.
- He has received special recognition from the Embassy of Argentina in Washington, DC; the Matias Delgado University of El Salvador; the Board of Culture of Andalusia, the IES, Alcalá de Guadaíra, Seville, Spain; from the Mexican state of Guanajuato; from the Argentine Society of Arts, Sciences and Letters in the Legislature of Córdoba, Argentina
- First prize of the Spanish TV (TVE) for its Poetic Contest on poems about solitude in 2004;
- Recognition of Excellence by the Prometheus Poetry Association, Madrid;
- The International Prize in poetry "Simon Bolivar, the Liberator" 2010
- The Fulbright-Hays scholarship for the anthology from Blue to Red as well as his literary activities in Nicaragua.
- His poetry has been selected for the permanent archives of Latin American Literature at the U.S. Library of Congress and is part of virtual anthologies, magazines, cultural supplements and texts in literature, among them: Passages, Bridges to Literature, Breaking Down Barriers, Keystone and Encuentros. Other notable awards include: Trilce Medal, Universidad de Trujillo, Peru (2016).
- Named Adopted Son of Vallejo's Native city (2017).
- Doctor Honoris Causa (2011), Tel Aviv, Israel.

== Bibliography ==
=== Books ===
• Tezanos-Pinto, Rosa, ed. El exilio y la palabra. La trashumancia de un escritor argentino-estadounidense (Exile and the Word. Trashumance of an Argentine-U.S. Writer). Buenos Aires: Editorial Vinciguerra, 2012.

• Zeleny, Mayra, ed. El cuerpo y la letra. Poética de Luis Alberto Ambroggio (The Body and the Letter. The Poetry of Luis Alberto Ambroggio). New York: North-American Academy of Spanish Language: 2008.

- Various authors (2023). Jarquín, Carlos Javier (ed.). Canto planetario: hermandad en la Tierra. Costa Rica: HC Editores. ISBN 979-8850092115.

=== Writings ===
- Todos somos Whitman/We are all Whitman. Arte Público Press, Univ. Of Houson, 2016.
- Estados Unidos Hispano (Hispanic United States). Nueva York, Colección Dorada, Long Island al Día Ed.: 2015.
- En el jardín de los vientos. Obra poética 1974-2014 (In the Garden of the Winds. Poetic Corpus 1974-2014). Critical edition published by the North American Academy of the Spanish Language, New York: 2014, elected by Infobae as one of the best books of the year.
- Cuentos de viaje para siete cuerdas y otras metafísicas (Travel stories for seven strings and other metaphysics). Indianapolis: Palibrio Ed.: 2013.
- Arqueología del viento / The Wind's Archeology. Barcelona-Mexico: El Vaso roto Ediciones Broken, 2011. (Winner of the 2013 International Latino Best Book Award for its bilingual version).
- La desnudez del asombro (The Nakedness of Wonder). Madrid: Ediciones Lord Byron, 2009.
- Los tres esposos de la noche (The Night's Three Husbands). San Jose, Costa Rica: La Casa de la poesía, 2005.
- Los habitantes del poeta (The Inhabitants of the Poet). Washington DC: Horizonte 21 Publishers, 1997.
- Oda Ensimismada (Ode in and of Myself). Buenos Aires: Alicia Gallegos, 1994.
- Poemas de amor y vida (Poems of Loving and Living). Los Angeles: Puerta Press, 1987.

Among the anthologies that he has compiled are:

- Labios de Arena (Lips of sand). Embajada de los Estados Unidos de América Managua, Nicaragua: 2014.
- Antología. Festival Latinoamericano de Poesía. Ciudad de Nueva York 2012. Carlos Aguasaco, Luis Alberto Ambroggio, Karla Coreas, eds. Nueva York: Urpi Editores, 2012.
- De azul a rojo (From Blue to Red). Nicaraguan Poetic Voices of the XXI century. Managua: Embassy of the United States and Nicaraguan Writers Center, 2011.
- Al pie de la Casa Blanca (At the Footsteps of the White House). Hispanic Poets from Washington, DC., Luis Alberto Ambroggio and Carlos Parada Ayala, eds. New York: North-American Academy of the Spanish Language, 2010.

=== Select essays ===
As a critic and essayist he has specialized in the poetry of the United States written in Spanish on issues related to bilingualism, identity and critical studies of renowned poets such as Borges, Vallejo, Gabriela Mistral and Dario that have contributed to his appointment as Honorary Member of Ruben Dario Cultural Heritage Institute. The following are some of his most representative essays:

- "Thomas Jefferson and the Spanish Language: Praxis, vision, and political philosophy", en
- "Spanish is my land." La Tolteca (Otoño 2014): 54-55
- "Rubén Darío y Antonio Machado: dos poetas, dos continentes, tres poemas y un camino" ("Ruben Dario and Antonio Machado: Two Poets, Two Continents, Three Poems and a Road") in Fondo Documental de Prometeo:
- "Rubén Darío y César Vallejo: unidos en un poema 'El Retablo'." ("Ruben Dario and Cesar Vallejo: United in a Poem 'The Manger'.") Revista Carátula
- "Convergencias y divergencias: Rubén Darío y Pablo Antonio Cuadra." ("Convergence and Divergence: Ruben Dario and Pablo Antonio Cuadra.") Fondo Documental de Prometeo
