= Coronado Municipality =

Municipality in the Mexican state of Chihuahua

Coronado
- Municipality
- Municipality of Coronado in Chihuahua

- Location in Mexico
- Coordinates: 26°44′N 105°10′W
- Country: Mexico
- State: Chihuahua
- Municipal seat: Villa Coronado

Area
  - Total: 1,756.1 km^{2} (678.0 sq mi)

Population (2010)
  - Total: 2,284

Coronado is one of the 67 Municipalities of Chihuahua, in northern Mexico. The municipal seat lies at Villa Coronado. The municipality covers an area of 1,756.1 km^{2}.

As of 2010, the municipality had a total population of 2,284 up from 2,046 as of 2005.

The municipality had 79 localities, the largest of which (with 2010 populations in parentheses) were: José Esteban Coronado (1,121) classified as rural.

== Geography ==
=== Towns and villages ===
Name	Population (2005)
Villa Coronado	976
Iturralde	239
Total Municipality	2,046
