= Down These Mean Streets =

Memoir by Piri Thomas

- First edition
- Author: Piri Thomas
- Language: English
- Genre: Memoir
- Published: April 12, 1967
- Publisher: Alfred A. Knopf
- Publication place: United States
- Media type: Print (Hardcover, Paperback)
- Pages: 352 pages (1st edition, paperback)

Down These Mean Streets is a memoir by Piri Thomas, a Latino of Puerto Rican and Cuban descent who grew up in Spanish Harlem, a section of Harlem in New York with a large Puerto Rican population. The book follows Piri through the first few decades of his life as he lives in poverty, joins and fights with street gangs, faces racism (in both New York City and elsewhere), travels, develops an addiction to heroin, gets involved in crime, is imprisoned, and is finally released.

One of the major themes of Down These Mean Streets centers on Piri Thomas' identity as a dark-complexioned Puerto Rican. Although he is of Puerto Rican and Cuban heritage, he is seen as black rather than Hispanic or Latino. His own family rejects the African aspect of their Latino-Caribbean ancestry, causing Piri to spend much of his youth and early adult life contemplating his racial and ethnic identity.

The book was originally published in 1967. A special Thirtieth Anniversary Edition in 1997 included a new afterword from the author. A sequel, 7 Long Times, gives more depth to his prison years.

== Plot summary ==
The story begins in Harlem, 1941, where Piri is living with his family. Piri's father has a job with the Works Progress Administration, while his mother stays at home with the children. After the death of Piri’s baby brother Ricardo, the family moves to the Italian section on 114th Street. Piri has various encounters with the local kids in the street, and despite various fights, Piri earns the Italians' respect by not ratting on them. When the family moves back to Spanish Harlem, Piri joins a Puerto Rican gang called the TNTs.

Piri and his family move to the Long Island suburbs. Piri plays baseball with classmates and attends a school dance where he flirts with a girl named Marcia; however, Piri is shocked to hear a group of girls talking about his skin color. This, along with Poppa seeing another woman, makes Piri very upset.

Three months later, Piri returns to Harlem and finds himself homeless. Desperate for cash, Piri searches for work and goes after a position as a sales representative. He begins a relationship with Trina Diaz and makes a new friend named Brew, who forces Piri to further question his own identity. Piri and Brew discuss heading South so that Piri can discover what it means to be a black man.

Piri argues with his brother José because José does not understand why Piri wants to go South; in his view, Piri is Puerto Rican, not black. Piri identifies as being Afro-Latino and has a darker complexion. However, his family claims it is from his father as he had indigenous roots. There is a discourse between his family and Piri and it demonstrates the ingrained colorism in his family. Poppa makes an effort to relate to and comfort Piri, but Piri still decides to leave, despite the objections from his family. Through his various encounters down South, Piri realizes that every place he goes to, no matter what language you speak or where you come from, if you are black, then you are black.

Shortly after Piri heads back to New York, Momma dies and Piri goes back to living on the streets. He develops an addiction to heroin and begins to sell everything he can to have money for heroin.

While Trina is in Puerto Rico, Piri impregnates a different Puerto Rican woman, Dulcien. Piri buys tickets for Dulcien to go back to New York with the baby. Piri also convinces Louie to get into business again; they, along with Billy and Danny, carry out a robbery of a bar/discotheque in downtown New York. During the robbery, Piri is shot in the chest, and upon trying to escape back to Harlem, he shoots the police officer who shot him.

Piri wakes up in the hospital, is questioned by police and is transferred to prison to await trial. He is sentenced to no more than 5–15 years for armed robbery. In prison, he studies masonry, works in construction and achieves his high school diploma as well as other educational certificates. Piri describes the encounters he has with other inmates. Piri is paroled after serving six years and is granted three years' probation; finally a free man, he decides to get a job, but he also immediately breaks one of his parole rules by having sex with a woman who is not his wife. Yet Piri misses Trina and ends up attending a dinner that she is at; he immediately regrets attending after he realizes she wants nothing to do with him. Piri goes back to visit his old building and claims that the mood hasn’t changed one bit. He runs into Carlito who offers him drugs, but Piri tells him he is clean and the memoir ends as he walks out onto the street.

== Themes ==
=== Racial Identity ===
Racial identity is a prevalent topic in Down These Mean Streets. The book tells the story of Piri, a Puerto Rican black man, who has to navigate through a complex system of discrimination and racial prejudice in the USA. Piri’s story portrays the difficulty of navigating through different racial identities. He has a Latino identity because of his Puerto Rican origin. However, he also has a black identity because his physical features relate him directly with the black community. The conflicting positions of both identities forces Piri to make the difficult choice to affirm both identities in the strict black-white binary racial classification formation of the US. Piri struggles in how he should identify himself in order to be accepted by his community. For the most part, he identifies himself only as a Puerto Rican, maybe because his "momma", who is of Puerto Rican ancestry affirmed this racial origin to Piri since he was a child.

However, there is also the chance that Piri is aware of the privilege that the Latino heritage has in contrast to the black one. This awareness would have caused Piri to use his Latino ancestry in order to prevent any discrimination that could arise because of his condition as a black man. In the book, there are various scenes where Piri claims his Latino identity in order to prevent further discrimination against him. For instance, when the Italian children were bullying him in the Italian part of Harlem; or when a white girl in his high school asked him about his identity in an almost derogatory way. Also, with Brew, Piri constantly tries to denote his Latin identity over the black one. At the end, however, Piri realizes that “his personal racial identity does not matter when faced up to his physical appearance.”

=== Race and gender ===
Down These Mean Streets explores how race and gender intersect and their influence on the life of Piri Thomas. One indication of how this intersection is at play is where Piri embraces the “black macho” persona in an intent to adapt himself to the urban American landscape of New York. In this attempt, Piri appeals to the “hypermasculinized performance of black masculinity as an object of fear and desire.” This means that Piri has a dual sentiment toward the black macho persona. On one side, this archetype is something he rejects since he thinks that by accepting his black identity, he is denying his Puerto Rican heritage. On the other hand, this archetype is also desired by Piri, since this mold is the only one that will permit him to be accepted in the US binary racial culture. Both representations, that Piri either embraces or rejects, come from the very hierarchical racial structure that Piri attempts to navigate.

Another perspective that this memoir permits to analyze in terms of race and gender, is how characters continually struggle against racial oppression at expense of women and queer subjects. The struggle in search of recognition leads not only Piri, but also characters such as his father and Brew, to neglect women and impose chauvinistic attitudes that only hinders more women and queer folks into the hierarchical structure of the United States.

Thomas’ autobiography suggests a kind of heteropatriarchal privilege through the presence of sexual encounters between dominant and subordinate identities. It is paradoxical that while this book shows that, however much Piri enjoys his sexual encounters with women of color, white prostitutes, or queer people of color, those sexual encounters do not affect his internalized racism and sexism. In other words, these sexual contacts do not change Piri's mind, or other’s people minds about women, queers and queer people of color. Thomas’ testimonial story positions males as active and females as passive, enabling only to male subjects, to invigorate their masculinity. Piri in Down These Mean Streets is a black heterosexual man, who redirects his struggle against his own racial discrimination and impose it on women and homosexual men. An example of this is how Piri and his black friend, Brew, make women and queer folks their sexual targets.

One key scene is where Piri and his friends go to buy weed from some transvestites. This scene is very ambiguous since it is difficult to say if the transvestites feminize Piri and his friends or vice versa. For instance, it could be argued that transvestites put Piri in a passive position since in this scene they are the clients, while Piri and his friends might be serving the role of prostitutes. The transvestites are the ones that, as a mode of payment, provide liquor and marijuana in exchange for a sexual favor. The response of Piri to this scene is anxiety. Nervous about his feminization, Piri splits his mind from his body, allowing only his body to experience pleasure. On the other hand, in his imagination, he places himself and his friends far from this apartment, at a rooftop party where music, young women and rival gangs occupy the atmosphere.

=== Barroom sociology (Chapter 18) ===
In Chapter 18, Piri and Brew have an encounter with another black man in a nightclub in Norfolk (the South of the US). This new acquaintance is Gerald Andrew West, a college student from Pennsylvania who is a light-skin African American. Gerald introduces a very interesting topic into the conversation, a topic that for Piri is highly contested (and the reason why he went to the South in the first place). Gerald complains that white people allow him only to be a negro (a black man), but negroes do not allow him to be white. Gerald's perception of identity reflects that he sees race as a “burden.” He states that white men and black men have the burden of their own skins, respectively. However, he has the burden of both (white and black) skins. Gerald believes in his “right to identify with whatever race or nationality approximates his emotional feelings and physical characteristics”. On the other hand, Brew, who is a dark-skinned African American from Harlem, represents more the vision of “an angry black nationalist of the 1960s.”

This chapter captures the underlying problem that Piri introduces in the whole book, the search for an identity. Some interpretations can be made with regard to this chapter. For instance, it can be said that Gerald’s research book about Blacks can be understood as the book that Piri himself ends up writing (the memoir of Down These Mean Streets), which permits Piri to resolve his own identity crisis. In the whole book, Piri struggles between being a Puerto Rican born and raised in New York and being a black man in the eyes of US society. However, his identity crisis is resolved once Piri decides to write his memoir. Similarly, Gerald’s intention to research about the history and lives of black people in the South of the US, could be also seen as a way to reconcile his crisis of identity. In this way, Gerald’s decision to go to the South and research about Blacks would be a metaphor of Piri’s decision to write Down These Mean Streets.

Another interpretation of Piri’s decision to go to the South, sustains that Piri does so in order to know “what’s shaking” or what is happening down there. His trip to the South would have meant for Piri, an increase in his solidarity sentiment for Afro American people against white supremacy. This trip has also served him to reinforce his resistance toward the white and black binary that obliterates distinctive elements of his identity.

== Literary Devices ==
=== Analogy ===
There is a variety of narrative styles used in Down These Means Street and analogy is a significant one. Growing up in Harlem, Thomas witnessed drug dealers in the apartment he lived in, which had an impact on him. He compares the belt his father used to discipline him to the belt the drug dealers used as a tool to help inject drugs into their bodies. It is evident that Thomas had a set of morals, and to the benefit of both responsible parents living with him, he urged to be different. Even when he was influenced by Harlem's streets, he remembered his parents' discipline, which led him back on the right track. "While in prison his parents' teachings came to mind making him realize that 'a person is born a criminal.'"

== Nuyorican literature ==
The classification of Down These Mean Streets as one genre rather than another is a point of contention among literary critics—both from the time the autobiographical novel was initially released and in current academic discourse. Down These Mean Streets is a “book claimed by [many] literary traditions, such as U.S. Latin[@] literature or Hispanic literature of the U.S. and Puerto Rican literature written in English.” Anne Garland Mahler of the University of Virginia, on the other hand, classifies Down These Mean Streets as “an autobiography and bildungsroman that chronicles the childhood of Piri Thomas, a Harlem-born son of a Puerto Rican mother and a Cuban father, in Spanish Harlem in the 1940s.” Clearly, Down These Mean Streets fits all of these descriptions, depending on which point of view the critic takes in their analysis.

Most commonly, however, Down These Mean Streets is recognized as part of the Nuyorican literary canon (Nuyorican is a portmanteau of the words ‘New York’ and ‘Puerto Rican’, blending both the Spanish and English rules of orthography—‘nu’ instead of ‘new’ and the suffix ‘-ican’ without a final vowel). Just as Nuyorican, which defines an entire canon of literature from over the past several decades, blends the linguistic rules of Spanish and English, it serves as a representation of multiple cultural traditions. Carmelo Esterrich states that “‘Nuyorican’ writing has always been caught in the critical crossfire between two national spaces—Puerto Rico and the U.S. and between their literary and linguistic borders.” With his brief description of the complexity of the Nuyorican canon, Down These Mean Streets, however, seems to fit neatly into place. It contains a great many Spanish words surrounded by an English narrative—so many that Thomas includes a glossary for his monolingual readers to uncover their meaning within the bilingual context of the narrative. The context of the origins of Nuyorican literature, Esterrich affirms, stems from “a very specific social and historical context of Puerto Rican migrations to the United States” which resulted in “the literary movement created in New York in the sixties and seventies by Puerto Ricans who were either born in the city or moved there when they were very young.”

The Nuyorican movement is based on a concept of hybridity of Puerto Rican and North American culture. In her analysis of race and gender within Thomas’ book, Marta Sánchez argues that Down These Mean Streets is “a hybrid text of testimonial and imaginative literature” which “initiated the nuyorican stage of continental Puerto Rican writing” to create a “cross-pollinated identity.” Thomas’ narrative includes, as Sánchez observes, “many subjects society stereotypically associates with Latino minorities: poverty, educational failure, gang membership, drug addiction, welfare, petty crime, sexual ‘perversity’, and prison life.” By attributing these stereotypes as themes within his narrative, Thomas establishes the North American context as the setting wherein his Puerto Rican heritage struggles to adapt. Moreover, Sánchez states that Thomas “rejected the paradigms of black or white that dominated the period when Down These Mean Streets was published by generating intercultural linkages among Anglo-Americans, African Americans, and Puerto Ricans years before the concepts of hybridity, heterogeneity, and difference gained academic and social repute.” At the time it was first published, in the late 1960s, the civil rights movement was well underway. However, Down These Mean Streets overlaps the cultural division of Black and White that was the societal norm of the time. Thomas’ narrative tells of experiences that straddled multiple racial and cultural identities: his father was Black and his mother White; his parents were Cuban and Puerto Rican, respectively, which didn’t clearly fit the niches carved out by North American society. As Piri Thomas states in an interview with Ilan Stavans, “[a]lthough I was born in el norte my soul is Puerto Rican.”

Down These Mean Streets is seen by many scholars to be a foundational work of the Nuyorican literary canon. Thomas has been described as “the best known of his generation of writers and is generally considered the chronicler of the barrio since he was the first to describe his experiences as a second-generation Puerto Rican in the United States.” Indeed, Ilan Stavans notes that Down These Means Streets is “now considered a classic and has never been out of print.”

In another interview, with Lisa McGill, Thomas himself admits “I was one of the first Puerto Rican writers in the U.S. to write about the conditions we were living under. Other Puerto Ricans wrote, but they wrote about Puerto Rico and their home. I wrote about what was happening to us—or at least to me—and the surroundings in those years.” Further on, McGill asks Thomas of his opinions on the term ‘Nuyorican’ and how his book has thus been categorised. Thomas replies, saying “I didn’t want to be categorised. With Nuyorican I was given a name. I really wanted to be a citizen of the world. I wanted to be free because all of my life they were putting me in categories”. When asked if he has since become comfortable with this term, he again replies “No, it’s like when you buy a pair of shoes. If you want to wear those shoes, you wear those shoes. Everyone has accepted Nuyorican, so I just go along with it.”

Critic Regina Bernard-Carreño states that “Nuyorican biographies, novels and poetry, spoke directly to [the] misrepresentations of a people and their anti-colonial struggle. An important factor in Puerto Rican immigrant writing and the Nuyorican experience is the articulation of difference and anger [. . .]. Puerto Rican writing exposes anger towards Americanization and assimilation”, just as Thomas does in his book. Bernard-Carreño also asserts that “Nuyorican writing became the genre that included the dynamics of language (bilingualism), bicultural identity (the island vs. the mainland), and the sociopolitics contained therein. While all these dynamics inform Nuyorican writing, language is perhaps one of the critical constructors of the Nuyorican experience and identity…Nuyorican identity became its own culture composed of bicultural and bilingual people.”

== Censorship ==
Down These Mean Streets has either been banned or challenged in Salinas, California; Teaneck, New Jersey; Darien, Connecticut; District 25 in Queens, New York City, New York and in Long Island, New York; the banning of the book by a Long Island school district led to the United States Supreme Court ruling on Island Trees School District v. Pico in 1982.

According to Regina Bernard-Carreño, “Piri’s Puerto-Ricanness brought him success and enough of an insider perspective to have his book banned by the New York City Board of Education during the 1960s. Due to its explicit depiction of homosexual and heterosexual acts between and among people of color, who are impoverished and live in a ‘ghetto’ full of drugs and other downfalls, Down These Mean Streets was yanked from junior high school libraries in 1971.” While for modern eyes, Down These Mean Streets provides a raw account of life in El Barrio, at the time of its first publication in the late 1960s, the subject matter of homosexual sex acts and sexual interaction between races was taboo. Bernard-Carreño later explains that Thomas’ book has since been “used as a major ‘classic’ in courses of anthropology and sociology and excerpted in English literature courses as well” and that Thomas’ writing style categorised Puerto Ricans “through a literary and non-traditional academic lens” which was, perhaps, too contemporary for its time of initial publication.

An article in The New York Times on 9 May 1971, “Book Ban Splits a Queens School District”, describes a passion-fueled debate at a board meeting of Community School District 25 in a neighborhood in Queens County, New York, which lasted nearly five and a half hours. The article reports that there are some who seem to perceive a threat to their social values, specifically because the portrayal of New York’s Puerto Rican community in Down These Mean Streets includes “vulgarities and descriptions of sexual acts.” One parent at this meeting stated that she felt Down These Mean Streets “is a beautiful book—full of feelings” and that she views the book as “a learning tool [. . .] [t]he author was willing to expose his gut feelings so we could better understand the problems he faced. It promotes understanding.” Another parent, on the other hand, stated that she wanted her children “to have social awareness and I want them to know what they can do to correct social ills. But they are not ready to be exposed to sexual perversion [as depicted in the Thomas book].” Meanwhile, the article presents the position of the United Federation of Teachers, who “fought the ban and has requested the New York Civil Liberties Union to initiate litigation to remove it.”

In an interview, Thomas acknowledges that Down These Mean Streets “was censored all over the place.” Specifically, Thomas mentions Darien, Connecticut where a bond was issued unless the book was removed from library shelves in the town. Thomas continues, stating that the censorship was due to a worry that it “was going to poison the children’s minds.” While speaking at a college in Darien, Thomas said, “Listen, you can’t keep your kids in a greenhouse. This is the reality of what’s happening.”

== See also ==
- List of banned books
- Nuyorican movement
- Spanglish
- American literature in Spanish
