= Carlos Labbé =

Chilean writer

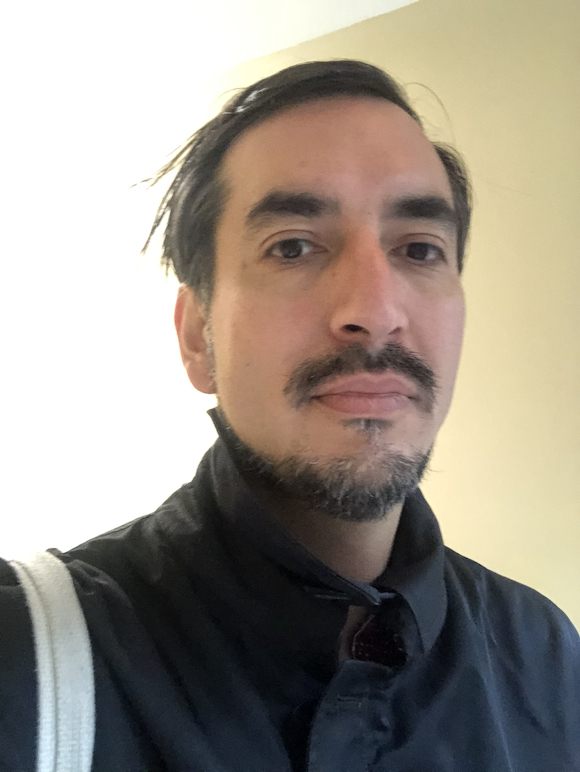
- Born: Carlos Labbé Jorquera; 28 January 1977; Santiago, Chile
- Occupations: Writer, musician, editor
- Writing career
- Language: Spanish

Carlos Labbé (Spanish pronunciation: [ˈkaɾlos laˈβe]) is a Chilean fiction writer.

== Biography ==
He graduated in Latin American and Spanish Literature; his dissertation was about Juan Carlos Onetti. Later he obtained a master's degree in Latin American and Spanish Literature with a dissertation on Roberto Bolaño. He has published a hypertext novel, Pentagonal: incluidos tú y yo (2001) and the novels Libro de plumas (2004), Navidad y Matanza (2007), Locuela (2009), Piezas secretas contra el mundo (2014), La parvá (2015), Coreografías espirituales (2018) y Viaje a Partagua (2021). His other works include two short story collections, Caracteres blancos (2010) and Cortas las pesadillas con alebrijes (2016), the literary essay book Por una pluralidad literaria chilena: el grupo Juan Emar (2019), the pop music records Doce canciones para Eleodora (2007), Monicacofonía (2008), Mi nuevo órgano (2011) and Ofri Afro (2018), and the ambient music collection Repeticiones para romper el cerco (2013). He co-wrote the screenplays for the films Malta con huevo (2007) and El nombre (2015). In the past he was a member of the bands Ex Fiesta and Tornasólidos.

Since 2010 Labbé has split residence between New York and Chile.

== Works ==
Novels

- Pentagonal, incluidos tú y yo (hypertext novel, 2001)
- Libro de plumas (2004)
- Navidad y Matanza (2007, German translation in 2010 by Peter Tremp, English translation in 2014 by Will Vanderhyden)
- Locuela (2009, English translation in 2015 by Will Vanderhyden, Turkish translation in 2017 by Saliha Nilüfer)
- Piezas secretas contra el mundo (2014)
- La parvá (2015, English translation in 2024 by Will Vanderhyden)
- Coreografías espirituales (2017, English translation in 2019 by Will Vanderhyden)
- Viaje a Partagua (2021)
- Riachuelo (2025)

Short Stories

- Caracteres blancos (2010)
- Short the Seven Nightmares with Alebrijes (2015, English translation by Ruy Burgos-Lovece)
- Cortas las pesadillas con alebrijes (2016)

Book-Length Essays

- Por una pluralidad literaria chilena. El colectivo Juan Emar (1923-hoy) (2019)

Music Records

- Doce canciones para Eleodora (2007)
- Monicacofonía (2008)
- Mi nuevo órgano (2011)
- Repeticiones para romper el cerco (2013)
- Ofri Afro (2018)

== Awards, Grants, and Recognition ==
- Writers Fund, Chilean National Council for the Books and Reading, 2003.
- Pedro Sienna Award of the Chilean National Council for the Arts and Culture, Best Feature Film Screenwriting for Malta con huevo (Scrambled Beer, in the English edition), co-written with Cristóbal Valderrama, 2008.
- Granta magazine's Best Young Spanish Language Novelists, 2010.
- Bronx Council of the Arts, BRIO Literature Awards, Contest Panelist, 2017.
- The Neustadt International Prize for Literature 2022, Juror.
- First Literal Latin American Voices in Spanish for Canadá and the United States Award, 2024 Second Prize, for his novel Riachuelo.
