= Villa Coronado =

Town in the Mexican state of Chihuahua

José Esteban Coronado
- Town
- Location in Mexico
- Coordinates: 27°50′25″N 107°35′21″W
- Country: Mexico
- State: Chihuahua
- Municipality: Coronado

Population (2010)
  - Total: 1,121
- Time zone: UTC−6 (Central)

José Esteban Coronado or Villa Coronado is a town and seat of the municipality of Coronado, in the northern Mexican state of Chihuahua. As of 2010, the town had a population of 1,121, up from 976 as of 2005.
