= Isaac Goldemberg =

Peruvian-American author

- Born: 1945 (age 80–81); Chepén, La Libertad, Peru
- Occupations: Poet and novelist

Isaac Goldemberg (born 1945) is a Peruvian-American author, founder of the Latin American Writers Institute, Brújula/Compass, and "Hostos Review", and a Distinguished Professor of Humanities at Hostos Community College. Goldemberg was born in Peru, and immigrated to New York City, where he currently lives, in 1964. He is a fellow member of the North American Academy of the Spanish Language.

His novel The Fragmented Life of Don Jacobo Lerner, was chosen by the National Yiddish Book Center as, "one of the 100 greatest Jewish Books of the last 150 years." The book tells the story of the life of Jacobo Lerner, a Jewish merchant, who immigrates to Peru from Eastern Europe. Jacobo has an illegitimate son, Efraín, by a Christian woman who he later abandons and thus never knows his son. Jacobo ultimately fails to achieve his goal of creating a traditional Jewish family before he dies, having been rejected by the respectable Miriam Abramowitz. Thematically, the novel presents an examination of Jewish identity and anti-Semitism. The book is divided into chapters which consist of vignettes written in the voices of the characters and an omnipotent narrator, as well as "Crónicas", and excerpts from Alma Hebrea, a publication of the Jewish community in the novel, which features writings by the characters

== Selected bibliography ==
- Tiempo de silencio (1970)
- De Chepén a La Habana (1973)
- "The Fragmented Life of Don jacobo Lerner* (1976)
- La vida a plazos de don Jacobo Lerner (1978)
- Hombre de paso/Just Passing Through" (1981)
- "Tiempo al tiempo" (1984)
- "Play by Play" (1986)
- "La vida al contado" (1992)
- "El gran libro de América judía" (1998)
- "Peruvian blues" (2001)
- El nombre de padre (2001)
- "Hotel AmériKKa" (2002)
- Los autorretratos y las máscaras/Self-Portraits and Masks (2002)
- Golpe de gracia (2003)
- "Il nome del padre" (2003)
- Los Cementerios Reales (2004)
- La vida son los ríos (2005)
- "La vie a credit de Don Jacobo Lerner" (2005)
- Tierra de nadie (2006)
- "Monos azules en Times Square" (2008)
- "Acuérdate del escorpión" (2010);
- "La vida breve" (2012)
- "Diálogos conmigo y mis otros" (2013)
- Chepén, madre de arena (2015
- "Remember the Scorpion" (2015)
- "Dialoghi con me e con e miei altri" (2015)
- "Tiempo al tiempo" (2016)
- "Dialogues with Myself and My Others" (2016)
- "Ricordati lo scorpione" (2016)
- "Philosophy and Other Fables" (2016)
- "Libro de reclamaciones" (2018)
- "Sueño del insomnio/Dream of Insomnia" (2021)
- "El gusano saltarín y otros poemas/The Leaping Worm and Other Poems" (2023)
- "Libro de las Raíces/Saphi Libro" (2023)
