= Alejandro Aura =

Mexican writer, essayist, poet, playwright and actor

Alejandro Aura (Mexico City, Mexico; March 2, 1944 – Madrid, Spain; July 30, 2008) was a Mexican writer, essayist, poet, playwright and actor, as well as a culture promoter and television host.

== Biography ==
Alejandro Aura was born on March 2, 1944, to a family from the San Rafael borough of Mexico City. His father Olimpo Aura Pineda was a mathematician, and his mother Ema Palacios Ordorica, whose grandfather Manuel Ordorica worked at the National Palace of Mexico with President Porfirio Díaz, was descendant of an aristocratic family. From a young age, Alejandro developed a passion for literature writing poetry, plays, essays, short fiction and fiction. He was also characterized by his political activism by participating actively in the student movement of 1968.

Besides his literary activities, he was director of the Theater and Dance department of the National Autonomous University of Mexico. In March, 1995, Aura created the national reading club "Aureolas" in his cultural bar "El hijo del cuervo'" in Coyoacán, where he presented several artistic, cultural and social activities between 1984 and 1999. In 1998, he created and directed the Institute of Culture of Mexico City (nowadays, Secretary of Culture) during Cuauhtémoc Cárdenas' term as Head of Government, until 2001. During his term, Aura promoted the use of public spaces for cultural activities and created reading clubs. He was director of the Institute of Culture of Mexico in Madrid, Spain from July, 2001, to December, 2003.

He got first married to Elsa Cross, with whom he had a daughter, Cecilia Aura Cross (1968-2007), then to Emma Ruiz and to actress Verónica Langer, with whom he had a son, Pablo Aura. He later married Carmen Boullosa, with whom he had two children: María and Juan Aura. In Madrid, he met his last wife, Milagros Revenega, with whom he spent his last days. Alejandro Aura died on July 30, 2008, in Madrid.

He was awarded the Latin-American Award for Short Fiction in 1969 for Los baños de Celeste (Celeste's Baths), and the National Award for Poetry Aguascalientes in 1973 for Volver a casa (Coming Home).

== Works ==
=== Short fiction ===
- Los baños de Celeste (1969)
- La historia de Nápoles (1988)
- La hora íntima de Agustín Lara (1993)
- El otro lado (1993)

=== Poetry ===
- Cinco veces la flor, in Poesía Joven de México (1967)
- Alianza para vivir (1969)
- Varios desnudos y dos docenas de naturalezas muertas (1971)
- Volver a casa (1974)
- Tambor interno (1975)
- Hemisferio sur (1982)
- La patria vieja (1986)
- Cinco veces (1989)
- Poeta en la mañana (1991)

=== Drama ===
- Los exaltados (1974)
- Las visitas (1979)
- Salón calavera (1982)
- Xe bubulú (1984), in collaboration with Carmen Boullosa.
- Salón calavera, Las visitas and Bang (1987)
