= Ángel Lozada =

American novelist

- Born: October 10, 1968 (age 57); Mayagüez, Puerto Rico
- Citizenship: American
- Education: George Washington University, Johns Hopkins University, New York University, The European Graduate School
- Writing career
- Notable works: La patografía, No quiero quedarme sola y vacía, El Libro de la Letra A

Ángel Luis Lozada Novalés (Ángel Lozada) is a Puerto Rican novelist, activist, educator and scholar.

== Biography ==
He was born in Mayagüez, Puerto Rico, in 1968. He has a Bachelors in Sciences from George Washington University (1990) and a Masters in Science from Johns Hopkins University (1998). He is a Ph. D. candidate at the European Graduate School. He also engaged in graduate studies in Spanish and Portuguese Languages and Literatures at New York University under the supervision of Prof. Eduardo Subirats Rüggeberg. He has studied creative writing with Chilean author Diamela Eltit. He has published two novels, La Patografía and No quiero quedarme sola y vacía.

Ángel Lozada was a Jesuit from the Maryland Province (1994–1996). He has been initiated in several African American religious traditions, and is a Palero (since 1998) and a Santero priest (since 2000), and has studied with several Palería, Ifá and Santería priests in New York City. He is also a professional intuitive Tarot Reader, and has studied divination and the esoteric tradition with Rachel Pollack and Christine Payne-Towler.

Lozada now lives in Pittsburgh, but formerly lived in New York City.

Lozada's controversial writings focus on marginalized subjects, animalization, colonization, transculturation, the Puerto Rican Diaspora, and recently, on the relationships between writing, schizophrenia, power and culture as they are deployed via academic discourses and languages. He has written extensively about the experiences of the Puerto Rican Gay subject within the larger context of postmodern, postindustrial American society. Published in 2006, No quiero quedarme sola y vacía is a novel written in Spanglish. The novel addresses the themes of the Puerto Rican diaspora in New York and the marginalization of gender and sexual minorities while criticizing Puerto Rico’s political status.

Lozada is HIV-positive and has talked and written openly and explicitly about his health condition in his fiction and interviews.

Angel Lozada is currently at the PhD program in Philosophy, Art and Social Thought at the European Graduate School.

== Published novels ==
- Lozada, Ángel (2013). El Libro de la Letra A. New York: Sangria Legibilities. ISBN 978-956-8681-32-6.
- Lozada, Ángel (2006). No quiero quedarme sola y vacía. San Juan: Isla Negra. ASIN B006QYQYH2. OCLC 74814318.
- Lozada, Ángel (1998). La Patografía. México: Editorial Planeta. ISBN 968-406-807-7.

== Contribution to anthologies ==
- Becerra, Eduardo (1999). Líneas aéreas. Ediciones Lengua de Trapo. ISBN 84-89618-31-3.
- Ortega-Esquivel, Aureliano; Juan Pascual Gay (2010). Escritura y esquizofrenia. Universidad de Guanajuato. ISBN 978-6074410884.
- Paz-Soldán, Edmundo; Alberto Fuguet (2000). Se habla español. Alfaguara. ISBN 1-58105-676-1.
- Pérez-Ortiz, Melanie (2008). Palabras encontradas: Antología personal de escritores puertorriqueños de los últimos veinte años (Conversaciones). Ediciones Callejón. ISBN 978-1-881748-61-8.
- Quiroga, José (2010). Mapa Callejero: Crónicas sobre lo gay desde América Latina. Eterna Cadencia. ISBN 978-987-1673-25-4.
- Suarez-Coalla, Paquita (2006). Aquí me tocó escribir. Trabe. ISBN 84-8053-391-9.

== Essays ==
- Una re-visión epistemo-lógica de la educación superior pública de Puerto Rico. Editorial Letra y Pixel, enero 23, 2011
- America the Hungry. November 24, 2010
- Principles of Puerto Rican literary beekeeping. September 26, 2010
- El partido nuevo pato-fóbico. October 24, 2004
