= Lorea Canales =

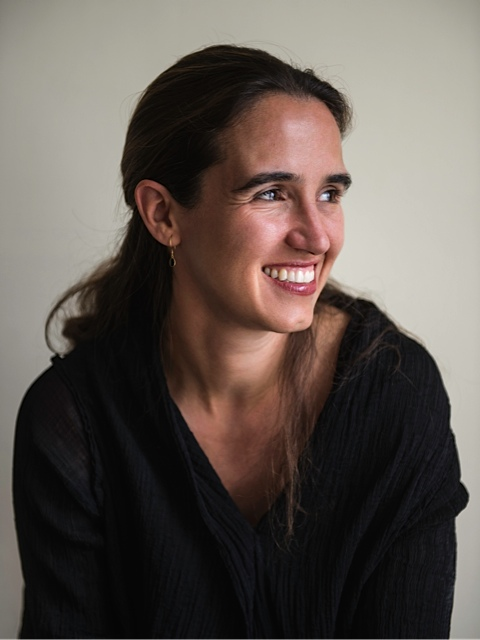
- Born: Mexico City, Mexico
- Education: Instituto Tecnológico y de Estudios Superiores de Monterrey, Georgetown University, New York University
- Occupations: Lawyer, writer, journalist
- Writing career
- Language: Spanish
- Genres: Fiction, nonfiction, poetry
- Notable works: Apenas Marta, Los Perros
- Website: www.loreac.com

Lorea Canales (Mexico City Mexico) is a lawyer, journalist, translator and writer. Her books, Apenas Marta (2011) and Los Perros (2013), have been critically well-received and featured at the International Book Fair in Monterrey, Guadalajara and at the Instituto de Cervantes in New York. An English translation of Apenas Marta (Becoming Marta) was released in the U.S. in early 2016.

== Biography ==
Canales is a lawyer, journalist, translator, and novelist. She was born in Mexico City and raised in Monterrey where she studied law at the Monterrey Institute of Technology and Higher Education. Canales attended Georgetown Law, and worked in the Law Offices of Collier Shannon Rill & Scott in Washington, D.C. In 1997, she returned to Mexico, she worked as a lawyer, taught law at Instituto Tecnológico Autónomo de México (IATM), and joined the newspaper Reforma as a legal correspondent.

In 2000, Canales moved to New York, where she wrote for several newspapers such as Día Siete, Travesías and The New York Times. She wrote a chapter on Lorenzo Zambrano, CEO Cemex, for the book "Los amos de México, by journalist Jorge Zepeda Patterson, published in 2007. In 2010, Canales received a master's degree in creative writing from New York University. She published her novel Apenas Marta (Becoming Marta)] in 2011, and Los Perros (The Dogs) in 2013. Apenas Marta has been published in English as Becoming Marta by Amazon Crossing, Amazon's Spanish language publishing house.

== Critical appraisal ==
Canales is considered an author of modern global literature. She has been praised for the detail and credibility of her characters. Her novels have been presented at national literary venues such as the International Book Fair in Monterrey, Guadalajara and Instituto de Cervantes in New York.

== Bibliography ==
- (2007) Los amos de México, by Jorge Zepeda Petterson. Lorea Canales is author of the chapter about Lorenzo Zambrano. (Planeta, ISBN 978-970-37-0717-1)
- (2011) Apenas Marta, novel (Plaza y Janés ISBN 978-607-31-0389-3)
- (2013) Los Perros, novel (Plaza y Janés ISBN 978-607-31-1568-1)
- (2014) Escribir en Nueva York. Antología de narradores hispanoamericanos, ed. by Claudia Salazar. (Caja Negra, ISBN 978-612-46559-5-1)
- (2014) Los Bárbaros 2. Antología de poemas e historias cortas. (Newyopolis ISBN 978-0-692-02512-3)
