= Spanish-language literature =

Spanish-language literature or Hispanic literature is the sum of the literary works written in the Spanish language across the Hispanic world. The principal elements are the Spanish literature of Spain, and Latin American literature. There is also American literature in Spanish and Philippine literature in Spanish, as well as literature from some other parts of the world including Spanish-speaking Africa.

== Nobelists ==
Eleven Spanish-language writers have won the Nobel Prize in Literature:

- 1904: José Echegaray, Spain
- 1922: Jacinto Benavente, Spain
- 1945: Gabriela Mistral, Chile
- 1956: Juan Ramón Jiménez, Spain
- 1967: Miguel Ángel Asturias, Guatemala
- 1971: Pablo Neruda, Chile
- 1977: Vicente Aleixandre, Spain
- 1982: Gabriel García Márquez, Colombia
- 1989: Camilo José Cela, Spain
- 1990: Octavio Paz, Mexico
- 2010: Mario Vargas Llosa, Peru

== Literature by nationality ==
- American literature in Spanish
- Argentine literature
- Bolivian literature
- Chilean literature
- Colombian literature
- Costa Rican literature
- Cuban literature
- Dominican literature
- Ecuadorian literature
- Equatoguinean literature in Spanish
- Guatemalan literature
- Honduran literature
- Mexican literature
- Nicaraguan literature
- Panamanian literature
- Paraguayan literature
- Peruvian literature
- Philippine literature in Spanish
- Puerto Rican literature
- Salvadoran literature
- Spanish literature
- Uruguayan literature
- Venezuelan literature

== See also ==
- List of Spanish-language authors
- List of Spanish-language poets
- List of countries and territories where Spanish is an official language
