= José Manuel Prieto =

Cuban novelist, translator and scholar (born 1962)

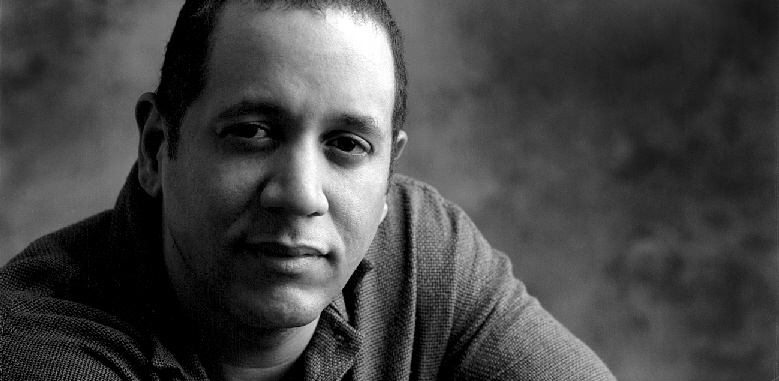
- Born: 22 May 1962 (age 64) Havana, Cuba
- Occupation: writer
- Literary movement: Postmodernism

José Manuel Prieto is a Cuban novelist, translator and scholar.

== Biography ==
José Manuel Prieto was born in Havana, Cuba, in 1962. He earned his PhD in History in Universidad Nacional Autónoma de México and has taught at the Centro de Investigación y Docencia Económica, Mexico City, from 1994 to 2004. In 2004–2005 he was the Margaret and Herman Sokol Fellow at The Dorothy and Lewis B. Cullman Center for Scholars and Writers in The New York Public Library. Prieto has been the recipient of fellowships, grants and awards from Sistema Nacional de Creadores, México, January 2003 – 2005 the Santa Madalena Foundation, April del 2001, Florencia and John Simon Guggenheim Memorial Foundation (2002)

Prieto's books have been translated into English, French, German, Norwegian, Italian and Russian and are available through a number of prominent publishing houses, including Grove Press, Suhrkamp, Anagrama, Christian Bourgois, Время and Faber and Faber .

Prieto has translated poems by Anna Akhmatova, and Josef Brodsky, as well as prose by Andrey Platonov, Vladimir Mayakovsky, Alexander Solzhenitsyn, and Vladimir Nabokov.

Prieto has lived in New York City since 2004. He teaches literature at Seton Hall University.

== Works ==
=== Novels ===
- Enciclopedia de una vida en Rusia' Barcelona: Mondadori, 2003.
- Livadia Barcelona: Mondadori, 1999.
- Nocturnal Butterflies of the Russian Empire (Livadia), New York: Atlantic Monthly Press, 2000
- Rex . Spain,: Anagrama, 2007.

=== Other works ===
- Nunca antes habias visto el rojo Cuba, 1995.
- Trenta días en Moscú Barcelona: Mondadori, 2001.
- El tartamudo y la rusa Mexico: Tusquets 2002.
- Die Kubanische Revolution und wie erkläre ich sie meinem Taxifahrer, edition suhrkamp 2559, Broschur, 218 Seiten ISBN 978-3-518-12559-5
