= North American Academy of the Spanish Language =

Non-governmental organization

Academia Norteamericana De La Lengua Española Inc
- Founded: 1973
- Founded at: New York City
- Tax ID no.: 13-2911131
- Legal status: 501(c)(3) nonprofit organization
- Director: Nuria Morgado
- Website: anle.us

The North American Academy of the Spanish Language (Spanish: Academia Norteamericana de la Lengua Española, ANLE) is an institution made up of philologists of the Spanish language who live and work in the United States, including writers, poets, professors, educators and experts in the language itself. Its mission is to support and promote the study and correct usage of Spanish in the United States of America (not including Puerto Rico which has its own academy). The Academia, established in New York City in 1973, is a corresponding member of the Real Academia Española (Royal Spanish Academy). The organization is also a part of the Association of Academies of the Spanish Language (ASALE), which brings together 23 corporations on four continents, in Spain, throughout the Americas, the Philippines, and Equatorial Guinea.

Spanish professor Tomás Navarro Tomás was a founding member of the academy and a member of RAE who fled to the United States from Spain in 1939 during the Spanish Civil War.

The institution was not named Academia Estadounidense de la Lengua Española because in 1973, New York state authorities – where it was established as a nonprofit educational organization – did not accept this denomination in order to avoid being mistaken for a governmental institution. According to the state, this would be more evident in its English translation: United States Academy of the Spanish Language.

Directors of the Academy:

- Carlos McHale (1973–1978)
- Odón Betanzos Palacios (1978–2007)
- Gerardo Piña-Rosales (2008–2019)
- Carlos Paldao (2019–2024)
- Nuria Morgado (2024–present)

== Members ==
- Luis López Álvarez
- Luis Alberto Ambroggio
- Joaquin Badajoz
- Tina Escaja Vice-Director (2026-present)
- Isaac Goldemberg
- Robert Lima
- José Ferrater Mora (1912–1991)
- José María Merino
- José María Balcells Doménech
- Darío Villanueva
- Alberto Avendaño
- Arturo Pérez-Reverte
- Priscilla Gac-Artigas
- Porfirio Rodríguez
