= Carmen Boullosa =

Mexican poet, novelist and playwright

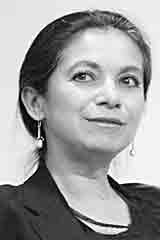
- Boullosa in 2006
- Born: September 4, 1954 (age 72); Mexico City, Mexico
- Occupations: Poet, novelist playwright
- Spouse: Mike Wallace
- Children: 2, including María Aura
- Relatives: Pablo Boullosa, Pedro Boullosa

Carmen Boullosa (Latin American Spanish pronunciation: [ˈkaɾmem bowˈʝosa]; born September 4, 1954) is a Mexican poet, novelist and playwright. Her work focuses on the issues of feminism and gender roles within a Latin American context. It has been praised by a number of writers, including Carlos Fuentes, Alma Guillermoprieto, Roberto Bolaño and Elena Poniatowska, as well as publications such as Publishers Weekly.

== Early life ==
Boullosa was born on September 4, 1954, in Mexico City, Mexico.

== Career ==
Boullosa has published eighteen novels. Though all different from one another, on theme and form, Boullosa's style has a distinctive personality.

One of her novels, Son vacas, somos puercos (1991, translated into English in 1997 as They're Cows, We're Pigs) is narrated in the first person by an old man looking back on his life. He was kidnapped and sent from his native France on a slave ship to the West Indies at the age of thirteen. To gain his freedom, he joins a group of pirates (or "pigs"), allowing Boullosa to compare two very different societal and political systems—traditional Europe and carefree pirates. In La milagrosa, a novel written in 1993, the protagonist is a girl who has the power to heal the sick and perform other miracles while she sleeps. She falls in love with Aurelio Jimenez, a detective sent to discredit her, even though she fears that her powers will disappear if she spends time with people. It ends ambiguously, leaving an unsolved murder without closure. Duerme, another popular work published in 1995, tells the story of Claire, a French woman whose mother was a prostitute. Attempting to escape the same profession, she arrives in Spain dressed as a man. To save a subject of the Spanish king, she reveals herself as a female and prepares to take his punishment of death by hanging. Beforehand, however, she is wounded in the left breast and her blood is replaced by water from the lakes of Mexico City. The water's magical powers make it possible for her to survive the punishment.

Boullosa is also well known for her Teatro herético (1987), a compilation of three parodies in play format—Aura y las once mil vírgenes, Cocinar hombres, and Propusieron a María. The first tells the story of a man called by God to "deflower" eleven thousand virgins in his life, so that heaven's overpopulation problem might be addressed, since the women will have to wait in purgatory for a time. The man then uses his sexual encounters as material for his television commercials and becomes a successful advertising agent. Cocinar hombres tells the story of two girls who find themselves to have become young adult witches overnight, so as to fly over the earth tempting but not satisfying men. Finally, the third play satirically recounts the conversation between Joseph and Mary before Mary gives birth to Jesus and ascends to heaven.

Boullosa is also the author of The Book of Eve (2023) that upends the biblical legend of Adam and Eve in a modern day exploration on creativity and authority.

== Awards ==
- 2019 – Premio Casa de América de Poesía Americana
- 2025 - Former President of Ecuador Rosalía Arteaga of the Glocal Women Foundation named Carmen Boullosa "Woman of the Year 2025" along with other cultural figures including the first female director of the North American Academy of the Spanish Language Nuria Morgado, Puerto Rican poet and novelist Giannina Braschi, and Chilean visual and performing artist Cecilia Vicuña".

== Personal life ==
Boullosa had two children, Juan Aura and actress María Aura, with her former partner, Alejandro Aura. She is now married to author Mike Wallace.

== Works ==
=== Poems ===
- Hamartia o Hacha, Editorial Hiperión-UANL, 2015.
- La patria insomne, Editorial Hiperión, Madrid, 2012., ISBN 978-607-433-721-1
- Allucinata e Selvaggia, Poesia scelte 1989-2004. A cura di Marta Canfield. Ed. Lietocolle, Florence, Italy, 2008. OCLC 875245553
- Salto de mantarraya (y otros dos), Fondo de Cultura Económica, ISBN 978-968-16-7401-4, México, 2004.
- La bebida, Fondo de Cultura Económica, ISBN 978-968-16-7401-4, ISBN 978-968-16-6580-7, Mexico, 2002.
- Salto de mantarraya, illustr. Philip Hughes, trans. Psiche Hughes, The Old School Press, England, 2002.
- Agua, con dibujos de Juan Soriano, Taller Martín Pescador, México, 2000. Jardín Elíseo, Elyssian Garden, trad. Psiche Hugues, litografías de Phillip Hughes, Monterrey, México, 1999.
- La Delirios, Fondo de Cultura Económica, Mexico City, 1998. ISBN 978-968-16-5401-6
- Niebla, Taller Martín Pescador, México, 1997.
- Envenenada: antología personal, Fondo Editorial Pequeña Venecia, Venezuela, 1993.
- Soledumbre, Universidad Autónoma Metropolitana (Mexico City), 1992.
- La salvaja, FCE, México, 1989. ISBN 978-968-16-3236-6
- La salvaja, Taller Martín Pescador, México, 1988.
- Abierta, Delegación Venustiano Carranza (Mexico), 1983.
- Lealtad, illust. Magali Lara, Taller Martín Pescador, Mexico City, 1981.
- Ingobernable, Universidad Nacional Autónoma de Mexico, 1979.
- El hilo olvida, La Máquina de Escribir, Mexico City, 1979.

=== Books ===
- El libro de Eve, Editorial Alfaguara, México, 2020. English translation: The Book of Eve, translated by Samantha Schnee, Deep Vellum, 2023.
- El libro de Ana, Siruela Ediciones, Madrid, 2016. Editorial Alfaguara, México.2016. English translation: The Book of Anna, translated by Samantha Schnee, Coffee House Press 2020.
- Texas, Editorial Alfaguara, México. English translation: TEXAS, translated by Samantha Schnee, Deep Vellum, 2014.
- Las paredes hablan, Ediciones Siruela, Madrid, Autumn, 2010.
- El complot de los románticos, Ediciones Siruela, Madrid, 2009.
- La virgen y el violín, Ediciones Siruela, Madrid, 2008.
- El velázquez de París, Ediciones Siruela, ISBN 978-84-9841-056-3, Madrid, 2007.
- La novela perfecta, Editorial Alfaguara, México, 2006.
- La otra mano de Lepanto, Ediciones Siruela, Madrid, 2005. Fondo de Cultura Económica, México, 2005, ISBN 978-968-16-7462-5. A Outra Mâo de Lepanto, translated to the Portuguese by Paulo César Thomaz, Editora Palindromo, São Paulo, Brasil, September, 2006.
- De un salto descabalga la reina, Editorial Debate, Madrid, 2002. English version: Cleopatra Dismounts, Grove Press, 2003, trans. Geoff Hargreaves.
- Treinta años, Alfaguara, 1999. English version: Leaving Tabasco, Grove Press, New York, 2001, trans. Geoff Hargraves.
- Cielos de la tierra, Alfaguara, 1997. English version: Heavens on Earth, trans. Shelby Vincent, forthcoming at Deep Vellum, 2016, ISBN 978-1-941920-44-2.
- Quizá, Monte Avila Editores, Caracas, 1995.
- Duerme, Alfaguara, Madrid, 1994. German: Der fremde Tod, edition Suhrkamp, 1994, trans. Susanne Lange. French: Duerme, L’eau des lacs du temps jadis, L’atalante, 1997, and Le serpent a plumes 1999, trans. by Claude Fell. Italian: Dorme, Ed. Le Lettere, 2000, trans. Antonella Ciabatti. Dutch: De Schone Slaapster, Arena, Amsterdam, 1995, trans. Aline Glastra von Loon. Will soon appear in Arab.
- La milagrosa, Ediciones ERA, 1993. English version: The Miracle Worker, Jonathan Cape, London, 1994, trans. Amanda Hopkinson. German:
- Die Wundertäterin, edition Surhkamp, 1993, trans. Susanne Lange. Italian: La Miracolosa, Vallecchi Editore, 1996, and La Milagrosa, Feltrinelli, 2001, trans. Pino Cacucci.
- El Médico de los piratas: bucaneros y filibusteros en el Caribe, Ediciones Siruela, Madrid, 1992.
- Llanto: novelas imposibles, Ediciones ERA, 1992.
- Son vacas, somos puercos: filibusteros del mar Caribe, Ediciones ERA, Mexico City, 1991, ISBN 978-968-411-338-1. English version: They're Cows, We're Pigs, Grove Press, New York, 1997, trans. Lee Chambers. German: Sir sind Kühe, wir sind Schweine, edition Surhkamp, trans. Erna Pfeiffer, 1991; French: Eux les vaches, nous les porcs, Le serpent a plumes, Paris, 2002, trans. Claude Fell.
- Antes, Vuelta, Mexico City, 1989. German version: Verfolgt, trans. Susanne Lange, Aufbau-Verlag, Berlin, 1996. Chinese: ed. 1999. French: Avant, Les Allusifs, trans. Sabine Coudassot-Ramírez, Quebec, Canadá, 2002. Before, translated by Peter Bush, Deep Vellum, forthcoming 2016. Several reprints at Alfaguara, Punto de Lectura, ISBN 978-607-11-2375-6
- Mejor desaparece, Océano, Mexico City, 1987. English version: Just disappear, trans. Christi Rodgers, VDM Verlag, 2009.

== Sources ==
- Contemporary Authors Online, Thomson Gale, 2004
