= Federico Falco (writer) =

Argentine writer

Federico Falco is an Argentine writer born in 1977. He holds a BA in communications from Blas Pascal University in Argentina and an MFA in creative writing in Spanish from New York University.

In 2004, he was given the Young Writers Award by the Spanish Cultural Centre of Córdoba, Argentina. In 2005, he received a grant for improvement from the National Trust for the Arts of Argentina, and in 2009, a scholarship from New York University and the Banco Santander Foundation.

In 2010 Federico Falco was selected as one of The Best of Young Spanish Language Novelists by the Granta Magazine.

In 2012, he participated in the International Writing Program's Fall Residency at the University of Iowa in Iowa City, IA.

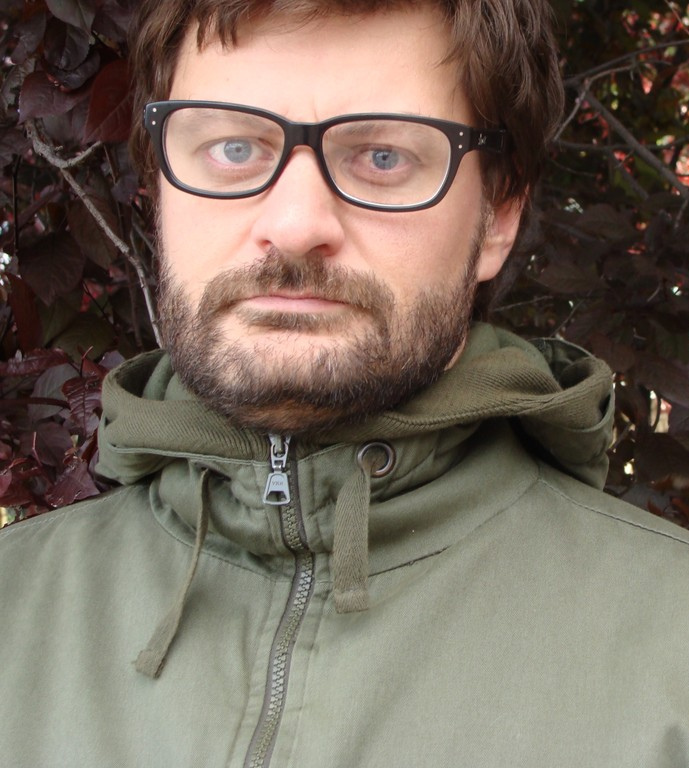
Federico Falco is an Argentine writer.

== Bibliography ==
Short Stories

- 222 patitos, Editorial La Creciente, 2004.
- 00, Alción Editora, 2004.
- La hora de los monos, Emecé 2010.

Novels

- "Cielos de Córdoba", Editorial Nudista. 2011.
- "Los Llanos", Anagrama. 2020.

Poetry books

- Aeropuertos, aviones, Ediciones ¿Qué vamos a hacer hasta las seis?, 2006.
- Made in China, Ediciones Recovecos, 2008.

Theatre

- Diosa de Barrio, Editorial La propia cartonera, 2010.
