= Jorge Luis Borges bibliography =

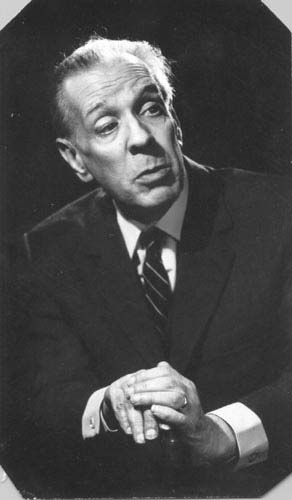
Borges in 1976

This is a bibliography of works by Argentine short-story writer, essayist, poet, and translator Jorge Luis Borges (1899–1986).

Each year links to its corresponding "[year] in literature" article (for prose) or "[year] in poetry" article (for verse).

== Original book-length publications ==
This list follows the chronology of original (typically Spanish-language) publication in books, based in part on the rather comprehensive (but incomplete) bibliography online at the Borges Center (originally the J. L. Borges Center for Studies & Documentation at the University of Aarhus, then at the University of Iowa, now—as of 2010—at the University of Pittsburgh). The following list focuses on book-length publication of original work (including collaborative work): it does not include individual short stories, poems, and translations published in magazines, nor does it include books (such as anthologies of fantasy and of Argentine literature) that Borges edited or co-edited. It also excludes several chapbooks, privately printed editions, etc. of under 50 pages each and does not attempt to identify first publication dates of individual stories, poems, etc. ISBNs refer to recent editions, not original publications.^{1} ^{2} ^{3}

- Fervor de Buenos Aires, 1923, poetry.
- Inquisiciones, 1925, essays. English title: Inquiries.
- Luna de Enfrente, 1925, poetry.
- El tamaño de mi esperanza, 1926, essays.
- El idioma de los argentinos, 1928, essays.
- Cuaderno San Martín, 1929, poetry.
- Evaristo Carriego, 1930, a tightly linked collection of essays on the Argentine poet Evaristo Carriego. An expanded edition was published in 1955, with essays on other Argentine topics (ISBN 84-206-3345-3).
- Discusión, 1932, essays and literary criticism. An expanded version was published in 1957.
- La leche cuajada de La Martona, 1935, advertising brochure written with Adolfo Bioy Casares.
- Historia universal de la infamia (in English: A Universal History of Infamy), 1935, short non-fictional stories and literary forgeries (ISBN 84-206-3314-3). The edition of 1958 adds a prologue and several more literary forgeries; 1972, (ISBN 84-206-1309-6). Several web sources mis-attribute this as Historia universal de la infancia (which would be A Universal History of Childhood).
- Historia de la eternidad, 1936, essays and literary criticism.
- El jardín de senderos que se bifurcan, 1941, short stories. English title: Garden of Forking Paths, published as a section of Ficciones.
- Seis problemas para don Isidro Parodi, 1942, comic detective fiction, written with Adolfo Bioy Casares, originally published under the name H. Bustos Domecq. English title: Six Problems for Don Isidro Parodi, 1981. (ISBN 0-525-48035-8)
- Poemas : 1922-1943, 1943, poetry. This was a complete republication of his three previous volumes of poetry, plus some additional poems. Some of the republished poems were modified for this edition.
- Ficciones, 1944, short stories, an expanded version of El jardín de senderos que se bifurcan, 1941. The 1956 edition adds 3 stories. US title Ficciones, 1962 (ISBN 0-394-17244-2). Also published in the UK as "Fictions" (ed. and trans. Anthony Kerrigan: Calder and Boyars, 1965), and later in a translation by Andrew Hurley (ISBN 0-14-118384-5).
- Un modelo para la muerte, 1946, detective fiction, written with Adolfo Bioy Casares, originally published under the name B. Suarez Lynch. The original publication was a private printing of only 300 copies. The first commercial printing was in 1970.
- Dos fantasías memorables, 1946, two fantasy stories, written with Adolfo Bioy Casares. Like Un modelo para la muerte, the original publication was a private printing of 300 copies, with no commercial printing until 1970.
- El Aleph, 1949, essays and short stories. A slightly expanded edition was published in 1957. English title: The Aleph and Other Stories 1933–1969 (ISBN 0-525-05154-6). The English-language edition is an incomplete translation of the Spanish-language book, but contains an autobiographical essay originally written for The New Yorker. Borges's Spanish-language Autobiografía (2000) is simply a translation of this English-language essay into Spanish.
- Aspectos de la poesía gauchesca, 1950, literary criticism.
- Antiguas literaturas germánicas, 1951, literary criticism, written with Delia Ingenieros.
- La muerte y la brújula, 1951, short stories selected from earlier published volumes.
- Otras inquisiciones 1937–1952, 1952, essays and literary criticism. English title: Other Inquisitions 1937–1952, 1964 (ISBN 0-292-76002-7).
- El "Martín Fierro", 1953, essays on the epic Argentine poem Martín Fierro, written with Margarita Guerrero, ISBN 84-206-1933-7.
- Poemas : 1923-1953, 1954, poetry. Essentially the same as Poemas : 1922–1943, but with the addition of a few newer poems.
- Los orilleros; El paraíso de los creyentes, 1955, 2 screenplays, written with Adolfo Bioy Casares.
- Leopoldo Lugones, 1955, literary criticism, written with Betina Edelborg.
- La hermana de Eloísa, 1955, short stories. This slim book consists of two stories by Borges, two by Luisa Mercedes Levinson, and the title story, on which they collaborated.
- Manual de zoología fantástica, 1957, short pieces about imaginary beings, written with Margarita Guerrero.
- Libro del cielo y del infierno, 1960, essays and one poem, written with Adolfo Bioy Casares. Some of this material comes from Antiguas literaturas germánicas, 1951.
- El Hacedor, 1960, poetry and short prose pieces, first published as the ninth volume in his Obras completas (Complete Works), a project which had begun in 1953. English title: Dreamtigers, 1964. (ISBN 0-292-71549-8)
- Antología Personal, 1961, essays, poetry, literary criticism, some of it not previously published in book form. English title: A Personal Anthology, 1967 (ISBN 0-330-23345-9).
- El lenguaje de Buenos Aires, 1963, long essays, written with José Edmundo Clemente. The 1968 edition adds several new essays by Clemente.
- Introducción a la literatura inglesa, 1965, literary criticism, written with María Esther Vázquez.
- Para las seis cuerdas, 1965, lyrics for tangos and milongas. An expanded edition came out in 1970, but all of the poems in either edition can also be found in El otro, el mismo, 1969. Ástor Piazzolla composed the music for these tangos and milongas, the result of which was a record praised by Borges.
- Literaturas germánicas medievales, 1966, literary criticism, written with María Esther Vázquez. This is a reworking of Antiguas literaturas germánicas, 1951.
- Crónicas de Bustos Domecq, literary forgery/essays, 1967, written with Adolfo Bioy Casares. An odd book: deliberately pompous critical essays by an imaginary author. English title: Chronicles of Bustos Domecq, 1976. (ISBN 0-525-47548-6)
- Introducción a la literatura norteamericana, 1967, literary criticism, written with Esther Zemborain de Torres. English title: An Introduction to American Literature, 1971, (ISBN 0-8052-0403-2).
- El libro de los seres imaginarios, 1967, expansion of Manual de zoología fantástica, 1957, written with Margarita Guerrero. English title: The Book of Imaginary Beings, 1969 (ISBN 0-14-018023-0); the English-language volume is actually a further expansion of the work.
- Conversations with Jorge Luis Borges, 1968, with Richard Burgin, originally published in English. ISBN 1-57806-076-1.
- Nueva Antología Personal, 1968, essays, poetry, literary criticism, some of it not previously published in book form. This includes quite a few previously unpublished poems, and has very little intersection with Antología Personal, 1961.
- Elogio de la Sombra, 1969, poetry. English title In Praise of Darkness, 1974. (ISBN 0-525-03635-0)
- El otro, el mismo, 1969, poetry, including a complete reprint of Para las seis cuerdas, 1965.
- El informe de Brodie, short stories, 1970. English title: Dr. Brodie's Report, 1971.
- El congreso, 1971, short story.
- Nuevos Cuentos de Bustos Domecq, 1972. Borges, a Reader, 1977, written with Adolfo Bioy Casares.
- El oro de los tigres, 1972, poetry. English title: The Gold of the Tigers, Selected Later Poems, 1977. The English-language volume also includes poems from La Rosa Profunda.
- El libro de arena, 1975, short stories, English title: The Book of Sand, 1977.
- La Rosa Profunda, 1975, poetry.
- La moneda de hierro, 1976, poetry.
- Diálogos, 1976, conversations between Borges and Ernesto Sabato, transcribed by Orlando Barone.
- Que es el budismo, 1976, lectures, written with Alicia Jurado, (ISBN 84-206-3874-9).
- Historia de la noche, 1977, poetry.
- Prólogos con un prólogo de prólogos, 1977, a collection of numerous book prologues Borges had written over the years.
- Borges El Memorioso, 1977, conversations with Antonio Carrizo (ISBN 968-16-1351-1). The title is a play on Borges's story "Funes El Memorioso", known in English as "Funes, the Memorious".
- Rosa y Azul: La rosa de Paracelso; Tigres azules, 1977, (short stories).
- Borges, oral, 1979, lectures.
- Siete noches, 1980, lectures. English title, Seven Nights.
- La cifra, 1981, poetry. English title: The Limit.
- Nueve ensayos dantescos, 1982, essays on Dante.
- Veinticinco de Agosto de 1983 y otros cuentos, 1983, short stories (also entitled La memoria de Shakespeare, English: Shakespeare's Memory)
- Atlas, 1984, stories and essays, written with María Kodama.
- Los conjurados, 1985, poetry.
- Textos cautivos, 1986, literary criticism, book reviews, short biographies of authors, translations. Edición de Enrique Sacerio-Garí y Emir Rodríguez Monegal. This book includes selected reviews, essays and notes Borges wrote in the popular Buenos Aires magazine El Hogar 1936–1939.

There are also 1953, 1974, 1984, and 1989 Obras completas (complete works) with varying degrees of completeness and a 1981 Obras completas en colaboración (complete collaborative works).

== Other works of note ==
- Los mejores cuentos policiales, 1943, with Adolfo Bioy Casares. Primarily translations of English-language detective fiction, plus one originally French-language piece and some Spanish-language pieces (including Borges's own "La muerte y la brújula").
- El compadrito: su destino, sus barrios, su música 1945, anthology of Argentine writers, including articles and a prologue by Borges himself, and articles by Evaristo Carriego and Adolfo Bioy Casares. Edited with Silvina Bullrich.
- Los mejores cuentos policiales; 2da serie, 1962, with Adolfo Bioy Casares. Primarily translations of English-language detective fiction, plus one of their own Bustos Domecq stories.
- El matrero, 1970. This anthology of Argentine writers, edited by Borges, contains three pieces overtly by Borges, but also contains three short Borgesian literary forgeries, "Un hijo de Moreira", "Otra versión del Fausto", and "Las leyes del juego."
- Libro de sueños, 1976, mostly translations and paraphrases of short excerpts from world literature. Some are narrations of dreams, some are about dreams, some merely dreamlike. There are a small number of original pieces and other Spanish-language pieces as well.
- Poesía Juvenil de J.L. Borges, 1978, a collection of poems written 1919–1922, with an extensive introduction (rather longer than the poems) by Carlos Meneses.
- Textos recobrados 1919 – 1929, 1997, previously unpublished early works, both prose (in a variety of genres) and poetry (ISBN 84-7888-337-1).
- This Craft of Verse, 2000, lectures, edited by Călin-Andrei Mihăilescu, a collection of six originally English-language lectures by Borges dating from 1967 to 1968, transcribed from recently discovered tapes. (ISBN 0-674-00820-0).
- Textos recobrados 1931 – 1955, 2002, previously unpublished stories, essays, poems, newspaper articles, book and movie reviews, etc. (ISBN 950-04-2326-X)
- Textos recobrados 1956 – 1986, 2003, previously unpublished essays, poems, articles, reviews, etc. (ISBN 9789500735858).
- Professor Borges: A Course on English Literature, ed. Martín Hadis and Martin Arias (English trans. New Directions 2013), transcriptions of the twenty-five lectures Borges gave in 1966 at the University of Buenos Aires, where he taught English literature.

== Short stories and prose poems ==
The translations of the titles are from Collected Fictions, translated by Andrew Hurley. The information is compiled from the Bibliografía cronológica de la obra de Jorge Luis Borges by Annick Louis and Florian Ziche. Not all of these works can be classified as short stories. For example, "The Dread Redeemer Lazarus Morell" is largely factual, but it reads like a work of fiction. Conversely, the fictional "Pierre Menard, Author of the Quixote" is written in a style resembling an essay in literary criticism.

The groupings represent books in which these were first published; they are listed by the English translation of the original Spanish-language book.

=== Earlier collections ===
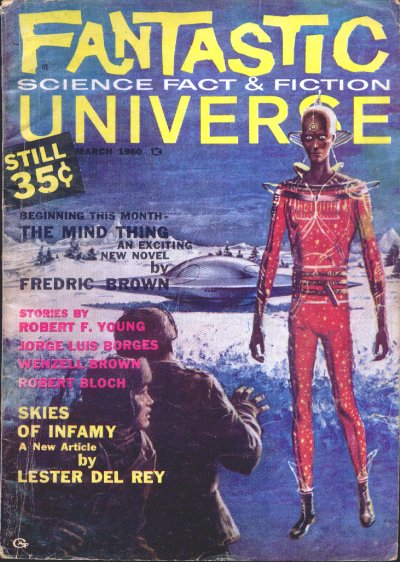
An English translation of "El brujo postergado" was published in Fantastic Universe in 1960 as "The Rejected Sorcerer"

Spanish title	English title	Original Publication
A Universal History of Infamy (1935)
"El atroz redentor Lázarus Morell" (orig. "El espantoso redentor Lázarus Morell")	"The Cruel Redeemer Lazarus Morell"	Crítica v. 1, no. 1. Buenos Aires, 12 August 1933
"El impostor inverosímil Tom Castro"	"The Improbable Impostor Tom Castro"	Crítica v. 1, no. 8. 30 September 1933
"La viuda Ching, pirata" (orig. "La viuda Ching")	"The Widow Ching -- Pirate"	Crítica v. 1, no. 3. 26 August 1933
"El proveedor de iniquidades Monk Eastman" (orig. "Eastman, el proveedor de iniquidades")	"Monk Eastman, Purveyor of Iniquities"	Crítica v. 1, no. 2. 19 August 1933
"El asesino desinteresado Bill Harrigan"	"The Disinterested Killer Bill Harrigan"	Crítica v. 1, no. 18. 9 December 1933
"El incivil maestro de ceremonias Kotsuké no Suké"	"The Uncivil Teacher of Court Etiquette Kotsuke no Suke"	Crítica v. 1, no. 18. 9 December 1933
"El tintorero enmascarado Hákim de Merv" (orig. "El rostro del Profeta")	"Hakim, the Masked Dyer of Merv"	Crítica v. 1, no. 24. 20 January 1934
"Hombre de la esquina rosada" (orig. "Hombre de las orillas")	"Man on Pink Corner" (also as "Streetcorner Man")	Crítica v. 1, no. 6. 16 September 1933
"Un teólogo en la muerte" (orig. "El teólogo")	"A Theologian in Death"	Crítica v. 1, no. 46. 13 May 1934
"La cámara de las estatuas"	"The Chamber of Statues"	Crítica v. 1, no. 17. 2 December 1933
"Historia de los dos que soñaron" (orig. "Dos que soñaron")	"The Story of the Two Dreamers"	Crítica v. 1, no. 46. 13 May 1934
"El brujo postergado"	"The Wizard That Was Made to Wait" (1933) (also as "The Wizard Postponed", elsewhere as "The Rejected Sorcerer")	Crítica v. 1, no. 4. 2 September 1933
"El espejo de tinta" (attributed to Richard F. Burton)	"The Mirror of Ink"	Crítica v. 1, no. 8. 30 September 1933
"Un doble de Mahoma" (attributed to Swedenborg)	"Mahomed's Double"	Los Anales de Buenos Aires v. 1, no. 5. May 1946
"El enemigo generoso" (attributed to the Anhang zur Heimskringla)	"The Generous Enemy"	Los Anales de Buenos Aires v. 1, no. 10. October 1946
"Del rigor en la ciencia"	"On Exactitude in Science"	Los Anales de Buenos Aires v. 1, no. 3. March 1946
The Garden of Forking Paths (1941)
"Tlön, Uqbar, Orbis Tertius"	"Tlön, Uqbar, Orbis Tertius"	Sur no. 68. Buenos Aires, Argentina, May 1940
"El acercamiento a Almotásim"	"The Approach to Al-Mu'tasim"	Historia de la eternidad. Buenos Aires, Argentina, 1936
"Pierre Menard, autor del Quijote"	"Pierre Menard, Author of the Quixote"	Sur no. 56. Buenos Aires, Argentina, May 1939
"Las ruinas circulares"	"The Circular Ruins"	Sur no. 75. December 1940
"La lotería en Babilonia"	"The Lottery in Babylon"	Sur no. 76. January 1941
"Examen de la obra de Herbert Quain"	"A Survey of the Works of Herbert Quain"	Sur no. 79. April 1941
"La biblioteca de Babel"	"The Library of Babel"	El jardín de senderos que se bifurcan. Buenos Aires, Sur, 1941
"El jardín de senderos que se bifurcan."	"The Garden of Forking Paths"	El jardín de senderos que se bifurcan. Buenos Aires, Sur, 1941
Artifices (1944)
"Funes el memorioso"	"Funes the Memorious"	La Nación. Buenos Aires, 7 May 1942
"La forma de la espada"	"The Shape of the Sword"	La Nación. 27 July 1942
"Tema del traidor y del héroe"	"Theme of the Traitor and the Hero"	Sur no. 112. February 1944
"La muerte y la brújula"	"Death and the Compass"	Sur no. 92. May 1942
"El milagro secreto"	"The Secret Miracle"	Sur no. 101. February 1943
"Tres versiones de Judas"	"Three Versions of Judas"	Sur no. 118. August 1944
"El fin"	"The End"	La Nación. Buenos Aires, 11 October 1953
"La secta del Fénix"	"The Cult of the Phoenix"	Sur no. 215-216. September 1952
"El sur"	"The South"	La Nación. Buenos Aires, 8 February 1953
The Aleph (1949)
"El inmortal"	"The Immortal"	Los anales de Buenos Aires, ano 02. n.12. February 1947
"El muerto"	"The Dead Man"	Sur no. 144. November 1946
"Los teólogos"	"The Theologians"	Los Anales de Buenos Aires. April 1947
"Historia del guerrero y la cautiva"	"Story of the Warrior and the Captive Maiden"	Sur, no.175. May 1949
"Biografía de Tadeo Isidoro Cruz (1829–1874)"	"A Biography of Tadeo Isidoro Cruz (1829–1874)"	Sur no. 122. December 1944
"Emma Zunz"	"Emma Zunz"	Sur. September 1948
"La casa de Asterión"	"The House of Asterion"	Los Anales de Buenos Aires May–June. 1947
"La otra muerte"	"The Other Death"	La Nación, Buenos Aires. 9 January 1949
"Deutsches Requiem"	"Deutsches Requiem"	Sur. February 1946
"La busca de Averroes"	"Averroes's Search"	Sur. June 1947
"El Zahir"	"The Zahir"	Los Anales de Buenos Aires. July 1947
"La escritura del Dios"	"The Writing of the God"	Sur. February 1949
"Abenjacán el Bojarí, muerto en su laberinto"	"Ibn Hakkan al-Bokhari, Dead in His Labyrinth"	Sur August 1951
"Una leyenda arábiga (Historia de los dos reyes y los dos laberintos, como nota de Burton)"	"The Two Kings and the Two Labyrinths"	El Hogar 16. June 1939
"La espera"	"The Wait"	La Nación. 27. August 1950
"El hombre en el umbral"	"The Man on the Threshold"	La Nación 20. April 1952
"El Aleph"	"The Aleph"	Sur. September 1945

=== Later collections ===
Spanish title	English title	Original publication
The Maker (1960)
"El hacedor"	"The Maker"	La Biblioteca v.9, 2da ép., no. 3. 1958
"Dreamtigers"	"Dreamtigers"	Crítica no. 58. 15 September 1934
"Diálogo sobre un diálogo"	"A Dialog About a Dialog"	Destiempo v.1, no. 1. October 1936
"Las uñas"	"Toenails"	Crítica no. 58. 15 September 1934
"Los espejos velados"	"Covered Mirrors"	Crítica no. 58. 15 September 1934
"Argumentum ornithologicum"	"Argumentum Ornithologicum"	El Hacedor. Emecé Editores, Buenos Aires, 1960
"El cautivo"	"The Captive"	La Biblioteca v.9, 2da ép., no. 1. January 1957
"El simulacro"	"The Mountebank"	La Biblioteca v.9, 2da ép., no. 1. January 1957
"Delia Elena San Marco"	"Delia Elena San Marco"	Davar no. 50. Buenos Aires, January 1954
"Diálogo de muertos"	"A Dialog Between Dead Men"	La Biblioteca v. 9, 2da ép., no. 2. April 1957
"La trama"	"The Plot"	La Biblioteca v. 9, 2da ép., no. 2. April 1957
"Un problema"	"A Problem"	La Biblioteca v. 9, 2da ép., no. 2. April 1957
"Una rosa amarilla"	"The Yellow Rose"	El Hogar 52.2409, 20 January 1956
"El testigo"	"The Witness"	Sur no. 247. July 1957
"Martín Fierro"	"Martín Fierro"	Sur no. 247. July 1957
"Mutaciones"	"Mutations"	Sur no. 228. May–June 1954
"Parábola de Cervantes y del Quijote"	"Parable of Cervantes and the Quixote"	Sur no. 233. March 1955
"Paradiso XXXI, 108"	"Paradiso XXXI, 108"	Sur no. 231. November 1954
"Parábola del palacio"	"Parable of the Palace"	Sur no. 243. November 1956
"Everything and nothing"	"Everything and Nothing"	Versión no. 1. Mendoza, Autumn 1958
"Ragnarök"	"Ragnarök"	Sur no. 257. March 1959
"Inferno, I, 32"	"Inferno, I, 32"	Ciclón v. 1, no. 3. Havana, May 1955
"Borges y yo"	"Borges and I"	La Biblioteca v.9, 2da ép., no. 1. January 1957
"In Memoriam J.F.K."	"In Memoriam J.F.K."	El Hacedor, 1967, Fourth edition
The Other, the Same (1969)
"El Puñal"	"The Dagger"	Marcha, Mondevideo, January 1954
In Praise of Darkness (1969)
"The Unending Gift"	"The Unending Gift"	La Nación, 11 February 1968
"Mayo 20, 1928"	"May 20, 1928"	Sur, 316–317, January–April 1969
"El Etnógrafo"	"The Anthropologist"	1969
"Pedro Salvadores"	"Pedro Salvadores"	1969
"Los Gauchos"	"The Gauchos"	La Nación, 16 August 1969
"Buenos Aires"	"Buenos Aires"	1969
"Fragmentos De Un Evangelio Apócrifo"	"Fragments from an Apocryphal Gospel"	1969
"Leyenda"	"Legend"	1969
"Una Oración"	"A Prayer"	1969
"His End And His Beginning"	"His End And His Beginning"	1969
Doctor Brodie's Report (1970)
"La intrusa"	"The Interloper"	Sixth edition of El Aleph. Emecé, Buenos Aires, 1966
"El indigno"	"Unworthy"	Brodie's Report. August 1970
"Historia de Rosendo Juárez"	"The Story from Rosendo Juárez"	La Nación. 9 November 1969
"El encuentro"	"The Encounter"	La Prensa. Buenos Aires, 5 October 1969
"Juan Muraña"	"Juan Muraña"	La Prensa. Buenos Aires, March 1970
"La señora mayor"	"The Elderly Lady"	Brodie's Report. August 1970
"El duelo"	"The Duel"	Brodie's Report. August 1970
"El otro duelo"	"The Other Duel"	Los Libros. August 1970
"Guayaquil"	"Guayaquil"	Periscopio, 1.46, 4 August 1970
"El evangelio según Marcos"	"The Gospel According to Mark"	La Nación. Buenos Aires, 2 August 1969
"El informe de Brodie"	"Brodie's Report"	Brodie's Report. August 1970
The Gold of the Tigers (1972)
"Tú"	"You"	La Nación, 11 January 1970
"La Promesa"	"The Promise"	1972
"El Estupor"	"The Stupor"	1972
"Los Cuatro Ciclos"	"The Four Cycles"	1972
"El Sueño De Pedro Henríquez Ureña"	"The Dream of Pedro Henriquez Ureña"	1972
"El Palacio"	"The Palace"	1972
"Hengist Quiere Hombres (449 A.D.)"	"Hengist Wants Men"	1972
The Book of Sand (1975)
"El otro"	"The Other"	Imprenta de Francisco A. Colombo, Buenos Aires, 1972
"Ulrica"	"Ulrikke"	1975
"El congreso"	"The Congress"	El Archibrazo Editor, Buenos Aires, 1971
"There are more things"	"There Are More Things"	Crisis, 2.13, May 1974
"La secta de los treinta"	"The Sect of the Thirty"	1975
"La noche de los dones"	"The Night of the Gifts"	La Prensa, 19 December 1971
"El espejo y la mascara"	"The Mirror and the Mask"	1975
"'Undr'"	"'Undr'"	1975
"Utopía de un hombre que está cansado"	"A Weary Man's Utopia"	La Nación, 5 May 1974 (Nebula Award nominee)
"El soborno"	"The Bribe"	1975
"Avelino Arredondo"	"Avelino Arredondo"	1975
"El disco"	"The Disk"	1975
"El libro de arena"	"The Book of Sand"	1975
The Iron Coin (1976)
"991 A.D."	"991 A.D."	1976
"Episodio Del Enemigo"	"Episode of the Enemy"	Estafeta Literaria, 379–380, 23 September-7 October 1967
History of the Night (1977)
"Alguien"	"Someone"	1977
"El Tigre"	"The Tiger"	1977
"Un Escolio"	"A Scholium"	1977
"El Juego"	"The Game"	1977
"El Condenado"	"The Damned"	1977
"El Caballo"	"The Horse"	1977
The Limit (1981)
"El Acto Del Libro"	"The Act of the Book"	Clarín, 21 May 1981
"Dos Formas Del Insomnio"	"Two Forms of Insomnia"	La Prensa, 1981
"Nota Para Un Cuento Fantástico"	"Notes on a Fantastic Story"	1981
"Andrés Armoa"	"Andrés Armoa"	1981
"Un Sueño"	"A Dream"	1981
"Nihon"	"Nihon"	1981
Shakespeare's Memory (1983)
"Veinticinco de Agosto, 1983"	"August 25, 1983"	La Nación, 27 March 1983
"Tigres Azules"	"Blue Tigers"	Rosa y Azul, Barcelona, Sedmay Ediciones, 1977
"La Rosa de Paracelso"	"The Rose of Paracelsus"	Rosa y Azul, Barcelona, Sedmay Ediciones, 1977
"La Memoria de Shakespeare"	"Shakespeare's Memory"	Clarín, 15 May 1980
The Conjured Ones (1985)
"La Trama"	"The Plot"	1985
"Elegía"	"Elegy"	La Nación, 29 January 1984
"Abramowicz"	"Abramowicz"	1985
"Fragmentos De Una Tablilla De Barro Descifrada Por Edmund Bishop En 1867"	"Fragments of a Clay Tablet Deciphered by Edmund Bishop in 1867"	1985
"Alguien Sueña"	"Someone is Dreaming"	La Nación, 16 December 1984
"Alguien Soñará"	"Someone will Dream"	1985
"El Hilo De La Fábula"	"The Thread of the Fable"	1985
"Posesión Del Ayer"	"Possession of Yesterday"	1985
"Sueño Soñado En Edimburgo"	"Dream Dreamed In Edinburgh"	1985
"Las Hojas Del Ciprés"	"The Leaves of the Cypress"	ABC, 15 March 1979
"Otro Fragmento Apócrifo"	"Another Apocryphal Fragment"	1985
"La Larga Busca"	"The Long Search"	1985
"1982"	"1982"	Clarín, 28 October 1982
"Juan López Y John Ward"	"Juan López and John Ward"	Clarín, 26 August 1982
"Los Conjurados"	"The Conjured Ones"	Lyra, 12.250, 1983

=== Others ===
- 1920: "Parábolas: La Lucha – Liberación"
- 1925: "Los Otros y Fernán Silva Valdés"
- 1927: "Leyenda Policial" (earliest version of "Hombre de la Esquina Rosada" (1935), also revised as "Hombres Pelearon" (1928) and "Hombres de las Orillas" (1933).
- 1934: "La Última Bala" (as Pascual Güida)
- 1934: "Dos antiguos problemas"
- 1946: "En forma de parábola"
- 1951: "Odín" (with Delia Ingenieros) (excerpt from Antiguos literaturas germánicas, also published as part of "Diálogos del Asceta y del Rey" (1953))
- 1953: "La Apostasia de Coifi"
- 1954: "El Dios y el Rey"
- 1955: "La Hermana de Eloísa" (with Luisa Mercedes Levinson)
- 1983: "Argumento de una Novela que no Escribiré"

== Essays ==
- "Yo, Judío"
- "A History of Eternity"
- "The Kenningars"
- "Metaphor"
- "Cycles' Doctrine"
- "Circular Time"
- "The Translators of One Thousand and One Nights"
- "The Art of Insulting"
- "The Total Library"
- "The Analytical Language of John Wilkins"
- "The Argentine Writer and Tradition"
- "The Wall and the Books"
- "The Fearful Sphere of Pascal"
- "Partial Magic in the Quixote"
- "Valéry as Symbol"
- "Kafka and His Precursors"
- "Avatars of the Tortoise"
- "The Mirror of Enigmas"
- "A Note on (toward) Bernard Shaw"
- "A New Refutation of Time"

== Screenplays ==
- Los Orilleros (The Hoodlums) (published in Spanish 1955) (with Adolfo Bioy Casares)
- El Paraíso de los Creyentes (The Paradise of Believers) (published in Spanish 1955) (with Adolfo Bioy Casares)
- Invasión, 1968, directed by Hugo Santiago (with Hugo Santiago and Adolfo Bioy Casares)
- Les autres (The Others), 1974, directed by Hugo Santiago (with Hugo Santiago and Adolfo Bioy Casares)

== English-language publication ==
Borges's work was first published in book form in English in 1962, with the translation and publication of Ficciones (1944) (Fictions, translated by Anthony Bonner, Alastair Reid, Helen Temple, and Kuthven Todd; edited by Anthony Kerrigan) and the collection known as Labyrinths, Selected Stories & Other Writings, translated and edited by Donald A. Yates and James Irby. In 2008, The Society of Authors (London) selected Labyrinths as one of the fifty most outstanding translations in the last fifty years.

In 1967, Borges began a five-year period of collaboration with the American translator Norman Thomas di Giovanni, after which he became better known in the English-speaking world. Di Giovanni would continue to be his primary English-language translator from that time forward.

=== Translations of original collections ===
- Norman Thomas di Giovanni, translator, A Universal History of Infamy (1972). Translation of Historia universal de la infamia.
- Andrew Hurley, translator, A Universal History of Iniquity (Penguin Classics, 2004). Translation of Historia universal de la infamia.
- Anthony Kerrigan, editor, Ficciones (Grove Press, 1962), with translations by Anthony Bonner, Alastair Reid, Helen Temple, and Ruthven Todd. Published later in the UK as Fictions (Calder & Boyars, 1965).
- Norman Thomas di Giovanni, translator, The Aleph and Other Stories 1933–1969 (E. P. Dutton, 1970). Translation of El Aleph. This English-language edition is an incomplete translation of the Spanish-language book, but contains an autobiographical essay originally written for The New Yorker. Borges's Spanish-language Autobiografía (2000) is simply a translation of this English-language essay into Spanish.
- Andrew Hurley, translator, The Aleph and Other Stories (Penguin Classics, 2004). Translation of El Aleph.
- Ruth L.C. Simms, translator, Other Inquisitions 1937–1952 (University of Texas Press, 1975). Translation of Otras inquisiciones 1937–1952.
- Mildred Boyer and Harold Morland, translators, Dreamtigers (University of Texas Press, 1964). Translation of El Hacedor.
- Anthony Kerrigan, editor, A Personal Anthology (Grove Press, 1967). Translation of Antología Personal.
- Norman Thomas di Giovanni, translator, Chronicles of Bustos Domecq (Dutton, 1976). Translation of Crónicas de Bustos Domecq.
- L. Clark Keating and Robert O. Evans, translators, An Introduction to American Literature (University Press of Kentucky, 1971). Translation of Introducción a la literatura norteamericana.
- Norman Thomas di Giovanni, translator, The Book of Imaginary Beings (Dutton, 1969). Translation of El libro de los seres imaginarios. The English-language volume is actually a further expansion of the work.
- Andrew Hurley, translator, The Book of Imaginary Beings (Penguin Classics, 2006).
- Norman Thomas di Giovanni, translator, In Praise of Darkness (Dutton, 1974). Translation of Elogio de la sombra.
- Alistair Reid, translator, The Gold of the Tigers: Selected Later Poems (1977).
- Norman Thomas di Giovanni, translator, The Book of Sand (1977).
- Andrew Hurley, translator, The Book of Sand and Shakespeare's Memory (Penguin Classics, 2007).
- Eliot Weinberger, Seven Nights (New Directions, 2009). Translation of Siete noches.
- The Limit
- Shakespeare's Memory

=== Collections originally in English ===
This is a listing of book-length English-language volumes that are reorganizations of Borges' works; translations of original collections are listed above.

- Labyrinths, 1962. This English-language anthology draws from numerous of his Spanish-language works.
- Extraordinary Tales, 1967, with Adolfo Bioy Casares. (ISBN 0-285-64712-1).
- Selected Poems 1923–1967, a bilingual edition.
- Borges, a Reader, 1981.
- Everything and Nothing, 1997, several stories from Ficciones combined with two lectures from Seven Nights.
- Collected Fictions, 1998. Translated by Andrew Hurley. ISBN 0-14-028680-2.
- Selected Non-fictions, 1999. Edited by Eliot Weinberger. ISBN 0-670-84947-2, ISBN 0-14-029011-7.
- Selected Poems, 1999. Edited by Alexander Coleman. ISBN 0-14-058721-7.

=== Book-length interviews ===
- Conversations with Jorge Luis Borges, 1969, by Richard Burgin
- Borges on Writing, 1973, edited by Norman Thomas diGiovanni, Daniel Halpern, and Frank MacShane

== Notes ==
1. Several bibliographies also choose to include a collection of previously published essays, published in 1971 under the name Narraciones.
2. Some web-based lists misattribute El Caudillo, (1921 novel), to Borges. It was actually written by his father, also a Jorge Borges.
3. Many English-language titles and ISBNs still missing. Some of the volumes might be better classified in terms of genre.
