= Obol (coin) =

Unit of ancient Greek coinage

Obols through history

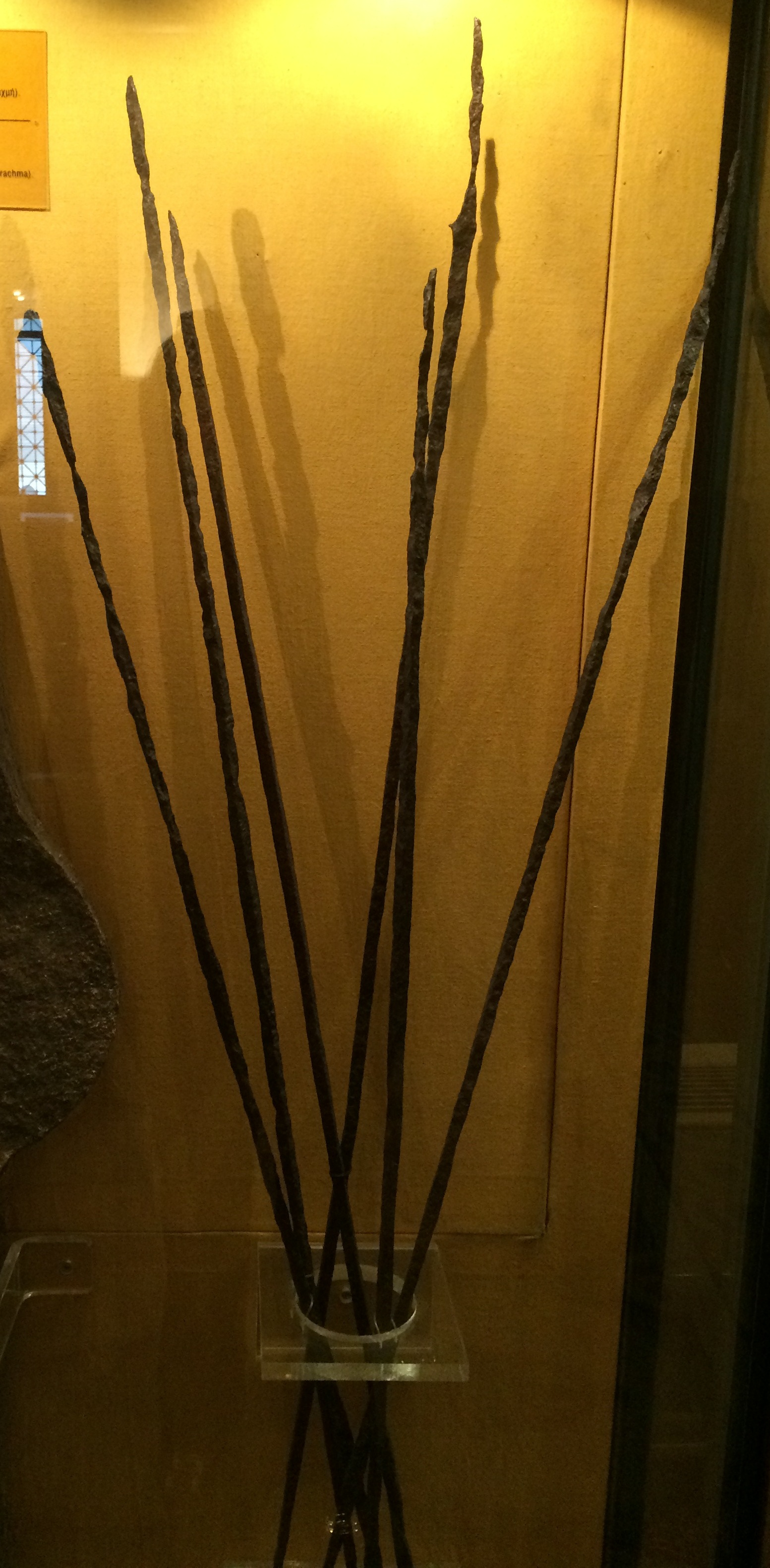
Six rod-shaped obols discovered at the Heraion of Argos (above). Six obols forming one drachma.

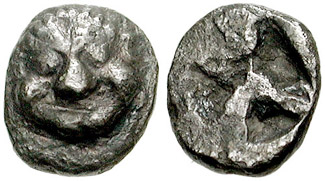
Silver obol of Athens, dated 515–510 BC. Obverse gorgoneion, reverse incuse square.

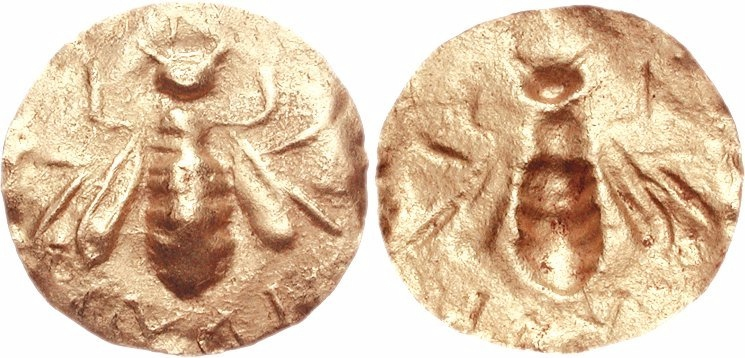
Charon's obol, 5th–1st century BC

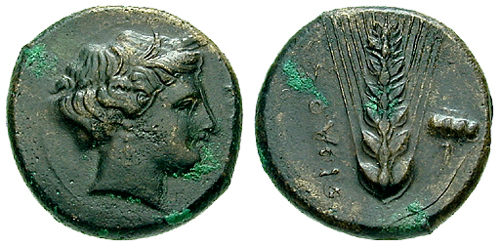
LUCANIA, Metapontion. c. 425–350 BC. Æ 21 mm.

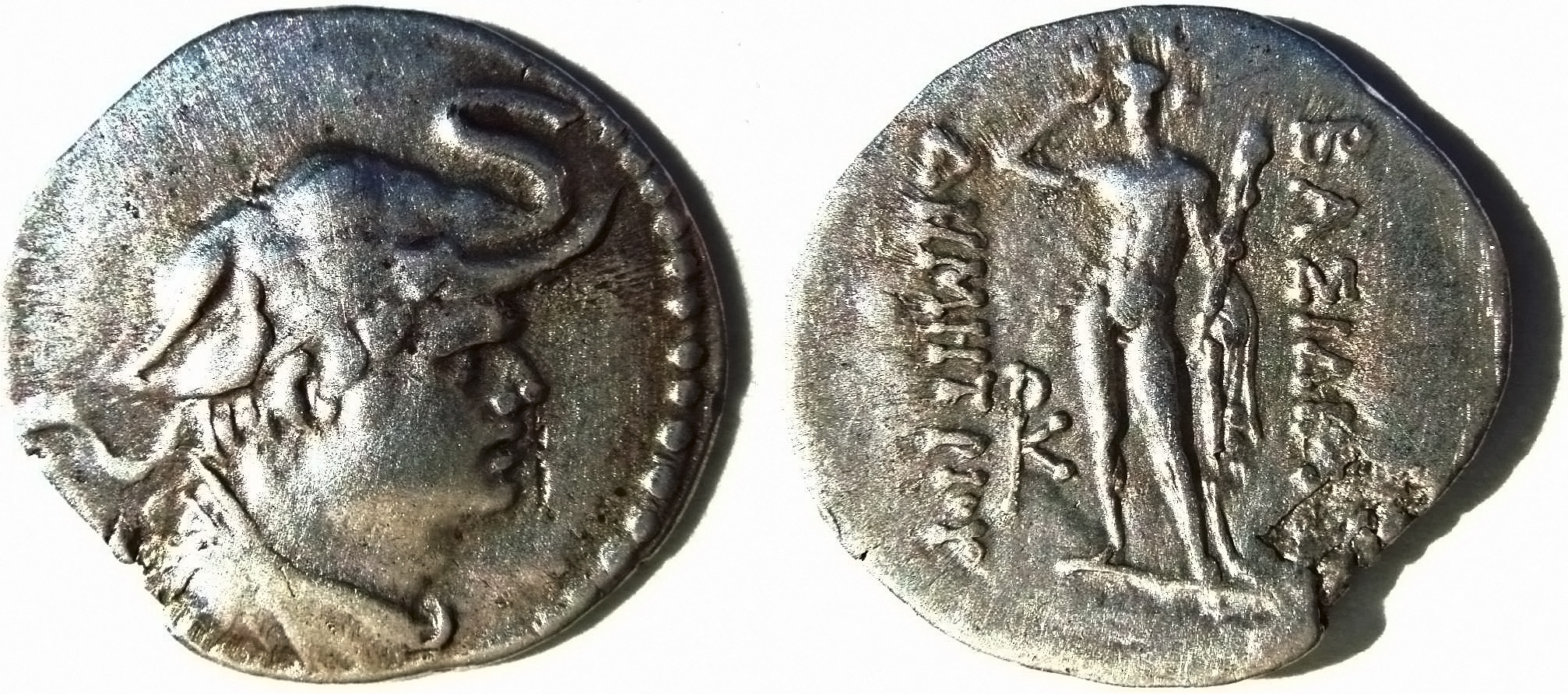
An obol of the Greco-Bactrian king Demetrius, 12 mm in diameter

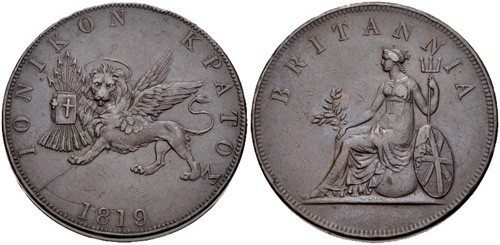
A 19th-century obol from the British-occupied Ionian Islands

The obol or obolus (Ancient Greek: ὀβολός obolós, also ὀβελός obelós, ὀβελλός obellós, ὀδελός odelós; lit. 'nail; metal spit'; Latin: obolus) was a form of ancient Greek currency and weight.

== Currency ==
Obols were used from early times. According to Plutarch they were originally spits of copper or bronze traded by weight, while six obols make a drachma or a handful, since that was as many as the hand could grasp. Heraklides of Pontus (died c. 310 BC) is cited as having mentioned the obols of Heraion and also gives the etymology of obolos (the name of the coin) from obelos (the word for "spit, spike, nail"). Similarly, the historian Ephorus in his equally lost work On Inventions (mid 4th century BC) is said to have mentioned the obols of Heraion. Excavations at Argos discovered several dozen of these early obols, dated well before 800 BC; they are now displayed at the Numismatic Museum of Athens. Archaeologists today describe the iron spits as "utensil-money" since excavated hoards indicate that during the Late Geometric period they were exchanged in handfuls (drachmae) of six spits; they were not used for manufacturing artifacts as metallurgical analyses suggest, but they were most likely used as token-money.

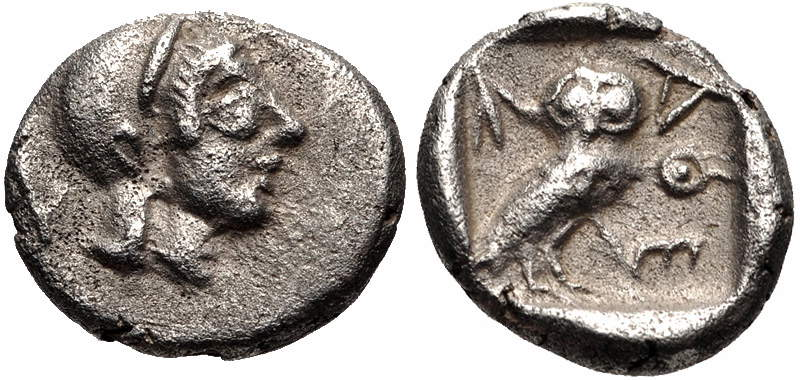
Silver Athenian obol, prominently featuring the regional owl design. 510–490 BC.

In Classical Athens, obols were traded as silver coins. Six obols made up the drachma. There were also coins worth two obols ("diobol") and three obols ("triobol"). By the 5th century BC, variations on obols expanded to include coins worth one and one-half ("trihemiobol") obols and half obols ("hemiobol"). The 4th century BC diversified further with some minted obols worth as little as one-eighth obol, equivalent to a single copper. Each obol was divisible into eight coppers ("chalcus", χαλκός, chalkós). In some other cities the obol was instead divided into twelve chalci. During this era, an obol purchased a kantharos and chous (3 L or 100 US fl oz) of wine. Three obols was a standard rate for prostitutes. In the 4th century BC, bronze obols were first minted, which were generally larger due to bronze being a less precious metal than silver, thus needing a larger amount to produce an equivalent coin. This larger size made bronze coins fairly popular, as their small, silver predecessors were much easier to lose track of. Obols had a variety of designs stamped into them based on the region in which they were produced. Athenian obols were typically emblazoned with the face of Athena on one side, and an owl on the reverse. Other regions in Greece had various designs, but the Athenian design was popular enough that the majority of obols discovered by archaeologists today bear the owl design. Diobols and triobols were differentiated from standard obols through slight variations to the owl design, changing the way the bird faced and how its wings were positioned for easily identifiable currency.

=== Funerary use ===
The deceased were buried with an obol placed in the mouth of the corpse, so that—once a deceased's shade reached Hades—they would be able to pay Charon for passage across the river Acheron or Styx. Legend had it that those without enough wealth or whose friends refused to follow proper burial rites were forced to wander the banks of the river for one hundred years until they were allowed to cross it.

== Weight ==
The obol or obolus was also a measurement of Greek, Roman, and apothecaries' weight.

In ancient Greece, it was generally reckoned as 1/6 drachma (c. 0.72 grams or 11 grains). Under Roman rule, it was defined as 1/48 Roman ounce or about 0.57 g (9 gr). The apothecaries' system also reckoned the obol or obolus as 1/48 ounce or 1/2 scruple. While 0.72 grams was the weight of a standard Greek obol, the actual amount of silver that went into making the currency could vary from region to region. Obols in Athens were typically near the 0.72-gram standard, while Corinth was documented having 0.42-gram obols.

== Literary use ==
The obolus, along with the mirror, was a symbol of new schismatic heretics in the short stories "The Zahir" and "The Theologians" by Argentine author Jorge Luis Borges. In the story's discussion of the circularity of time, eternity, and the transmigration of the soul through several bodies the author uses a quotation of Luke 12:59, mistranslated as "no one will be released from prison until he has paid the last obolus" since Luke calls the coin a lepton (a somewhat smaller denomination) rather than an obolus.

== See also ==
- The currency of the United States of the Ionian Islands, called the obol
- The British halfpenny, also formerly known as the obol
- Obelisks (ὀβελίσκοι, obelískoi), which also derived from the bars or the critical mark
