= Shakespeare's Memory (short story collection) =

Book by Jorge Luis Borges

- First edition
- Author: Jorge Luis Borges
- Original title: La memoria de Shakespeare
- Language: Spanish
- Publisher: Dos Amigos (Buenos Aires)
- Publication date: 1983
- Publication place: Argentina
- Media type: Print
- Pages: 83 (Alianza Editorial)

Shakespeare's Memory (original Spanish title: La memoria de Shakespeare) is a short story collection published in 1983 that collects the last stories by Argentine writer Jorge Luis Borges, which had been published in diverse mediums, such as the national newspapers La Nación and Clarín. It was published three years before the author's death.

An English translation of the stories by Andrew Hurley was published in Collected Fictions.

== Content ==
The collection contains only four short stories, making it Borges' shortest collection. These are (original titles in italics):

- "August 25, 1983" ("Veinticinco de agosto, 1983")
- "Blue Tigers" ("Tigres azules")
- "The Rose of Paracelsus" ("La rosa de Paracelso")
- "Shakespeare's Memory" ("La memoria de Shakespeare")

"August 25, 1983", the first story of the collection, is about Borges encountering an older version of himself at the last minutes of his life (it is similar to Borges' previous story "The Other", from the collection The Book of Sand, in which a younger and an older Borges also meet). In "Blue Tigers", the narrator gets hold of a group of mysterious blue stones whose number continuously multiplies and divides when one is not looking (retaking the themes of his previous stories "The Zahir", "The Disk", and "The Book of Sand": a direct confrontation with the inconceivable, in the form of an impossible object). "The Rose of Paracelsus" illustrates the old dispute between faith and incredulity. And finally, the titular story "Shakespeare's Memory" (Borges' last story) is about a man who is given the memory of William Shakespeare, enabling him to peer into the playwright's most secret thoughts, but also overloading him to the point of slowly forgetting his own life. Borges got the idea for this last story when, at eighty years of age, he dreamed that a faceless man offered him the memory of Shakespeare in a hotel room.
