= The Rose of Paracelsus =

Paracelsus is said to have resurrected a rose. Besides this, "The Rose of Paracelsus" may refer to:

- "La rosa de Paracelso" (English: "The Rose of Paracelsus"), short story by Jorge Luis Borges, in the collection La memoria de Shakespeare (English: Shakespeare's Memory).
- The Rose of Paracelsus: On Secrets & Sacraments, fictionalized autobiography of William Leonard Pickard
