= The Crystal Egg =

1897 short story by H. G. Wells

- Short story by H. G. Wells
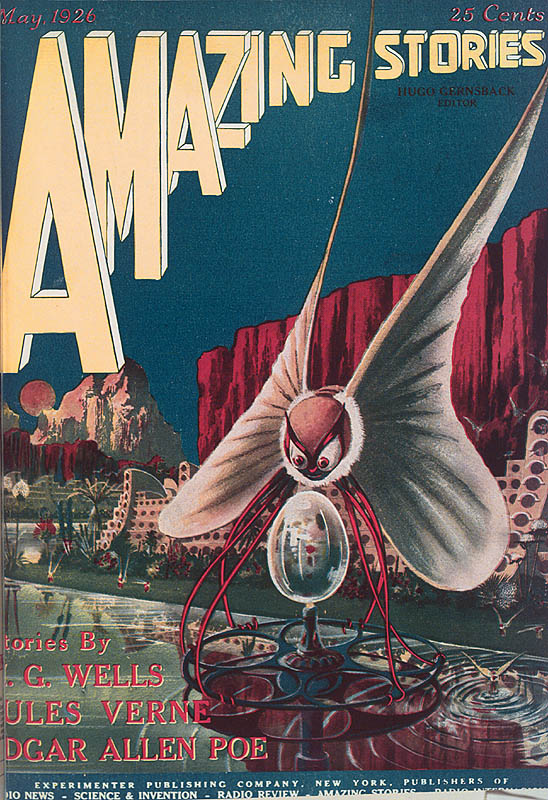
- Frank R. Paul's cover of Amazing Stories magazine that illustrates "The Crystal Egg", 1926.
- Country: United Kingdom
- Genre: Science fiction

Publication
- Published in: The New Review
- Publication date: May 1897

"The Crystal Egg" is a science fiction short story written by H. G. Wells, first published in the May 1897 issue of the British literary magazine The New Review.

The story tells of a shop owner, named Mr. Cave, who finds a strange crystal egg that serves as a window into the planet Mars.

The story was written the same year in which Wells was serializing The War of the Worlds in Pearson's Magazine, a year before it was published as a novel. Because of the vaguely similar descriptions of the Martians and their machines, "The Crystal Egg" is often considered a precursor to The War of the Worlds, as the Martian effort to observe and study humanity remotely might indicate their preparation for an eventual invasion.

== Story summary ==
Mr. Cave has an antique shop in Seven Dials, a district in the West End of London which, at the time the story was written, was a poor area. He is well-educated but in an unhappy situation. His wife, who is younger, treats him with contempt, as do his stepson and stepdaughter. He is in declining health.

He is a friend of Mr. Jacoby Wace, who is Assistant Demonstrator of Anatomy at a nearby teaching hospital and is interested in unusual characters like Mr. Cave. It becomes clear toward the end of the story that the narrator, who plays no part in the events, is an acquaintance of Mr. Wace.

Among antique items which have come into Mr. Cave's possession is a crystal egg. Wandering about the shop one night, he notices that a light comes from it. Studying it closely, "it gave him the impression that the object had for a moment opened to him the view of a wide and spacious and strange country." He takes the egg to Mr. Wace for safekeeping, after his reluctance to sell it to a customer has exacerbated his relationship with his wife and stepchildren.

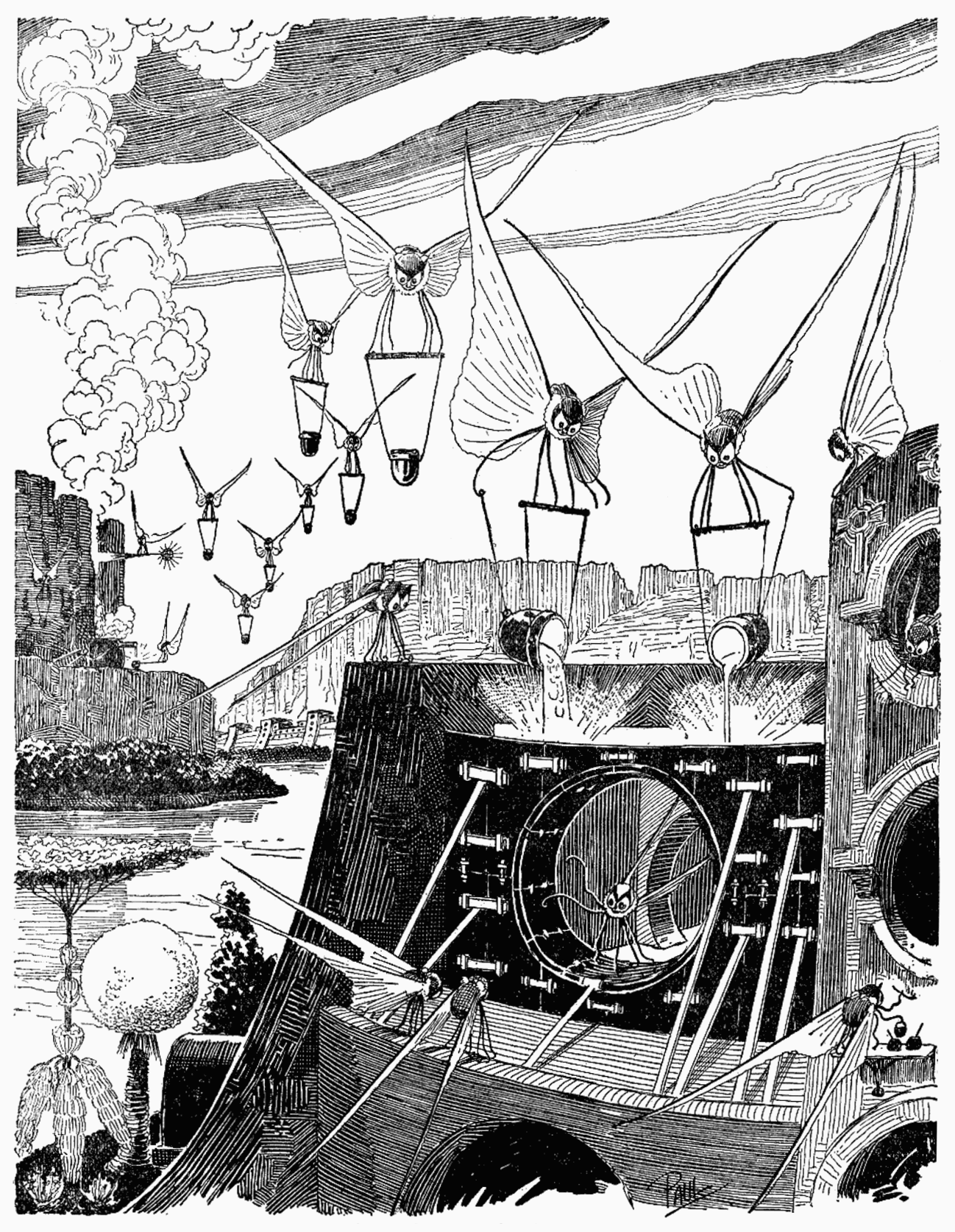
Illustration for "The Crystal Egg" by Frank R. Paul, 1926

Mr. Wace is unable to see the view inside the egg as clearly as Mr. Cave, whose fatigued mental state seems to enhance his perception of the vision seen within it. However, he believes in Mr. Cave's discovery, and during several sessions, he takes notes as Mr. Cave describes what he sees. After a few days, Mr. Cave takes the egg home with him between sessions, as the quarrel it caused has subsided; he likes to view the scene within whenever he can.

A description of what is seen inside the egg occupies about a third of the story. The crystal egg seems to have a counterpart in another place, through which the strange scenery is visible. The sky, and the two moons sometimes present, suggest that the view is of the planet Mars. The counterpart is one of several crystals atop masts on a large building, around which creatures that apparently own it are flying. They sometimes look closely at these crystals, presumably to study a remote scene.

Mr. Wace, visiting Mr. Cave's shop after a break of several days caused by pressure of work, is shocked to find that Mr. Cave has died. Some of his stock, including the egg, has been bought by another trader in order to pay for the funeral. This trader, Mr. Wace finds, has sold the egg; the customer, probably unaware of its special properties, cannot be traced. All that remains of the affair are the notes of Mr. Cave's observations. Mr. Wace and his friend, the narrator of the story, are left speculating on the significance of the crystal egg: it seems to have come from Mars, and there may be others like it on Earth, counterparts of the other crystals seen, "sent hither from that planet, in order to give the Martians a near view of our affairs."

== Adaptations ==
- Jorge Luis Borges was inspired by "The Crystal Egg" for his 1949 stories, "El Zahir" and "The Aleph".
- In 1952, "The Crystal Egg" was anthologized on the science fiction television series Tales of Tomorrow. The episode was a half-hour in length and told in first-person narration. The episode is vague as to whether it is set in the 1890s when Wells published his story or in the 1950s when the show was being broadcast. Since it is said to be conveyed by phonograph record, the latter seems likely.
- In Manly Wade Wellman's Sherlock Holmes's War of the Worlds, Alan Moore and Kevin O'Neill's The League of Extraordinary Gentlemen, Volume II and Kevin J. Anderson's The Martian War, crystal eggs appear and are used by the Martians to prepare for their invasion by spying on Earth.
- In 2001, the Radio Tales series produced the drama "Watchers", an adaptation of H. G. Wells's story for National Public Radio.
- The story was adapted as part of the second episode of the 2001 miniseries, The Infinite Worlds of H. G. Wells. Wells himself appeared as a character, who is inspired to write The War of the Worlds from the events. In the show, the crystal egg comes to Earth as a meteorite and serves as a two-way teleportation gate as well. Cave is divided into two characters, a married couple (William and Rosa); a Martian scientist takes Rosa back to Mars through the egg, before rendering it inoperable. British Intelligence later comes to acquire the egg.
- Kim Newman's short story "The Red Planet League" (collected in Gaslight Grimoire) reinterprets the events of "The Crystal Egg" as part of an elaborate hoax played by Professor Moriarty on Stent (the Astronomer Royal from The War of the Worlds) after Stent attempted to discredit Moriarty's The Dynamics of an Asteroid. In Newman's story, Cave is actually Moriarty in disguise.
- Cubicle 7's Victoriana tabletop role-playing game supplement Faces in the Smoke Volume 1: The Secret Masters. The section "The Planetarians" is directly based on "The Crystal Egg". It describes a group of British citizens who are gathered together by a government official to investigate a crystal egg that gives visions of an advanced technological society on the planet Mars. Both Mr. Cave and Mr. Wace are members of the Planetarians.
- In January 2018, “The Crystal Egg” was adapted by London-based production company Old Lamp Entertainment into a multimedia immersive show, which opened for a one-week run at The Vaults Tunnels underneath London's Waterloo Station. The adaptation followed the plot beats of the original story closely; reinterpreting it as being told to Wells by protagonist Charley Wace, who is convinced that a mysterious crystal egg he inherited as a young boy, was responsible for destroying his family. He believes the egg is being used by creatures of another world to insidiously destabilise society before invasion. The show received excellent reviews from audience and critics, with Theatre Box reviewing it as a “gripping vintage sci-fi”. Following the show’s success, in August 2025, Old Lamp announced it was adapting its stage play into a feature film.

== See also ==
- Extraterrestrials in fiction
- The War of the Worlds
