= The Aleph and Other Stories =

1949 book by Jorge Luis Borges

El Aleph
- First edition
- Author: Jorge Luis Borges
- Language: Spanish
- Publisher: Editorial Losada, Buenos Aires
- Publication date: 1949
- Publication place: Argentina
- Pages: 224 (penguin classics edition)

The Aleph and Other Stories (Spanish: El Aleph, 1949) is a book of short stories by Argentine writer Jorge Luis Borges. The title work, "The Aleph", describes a point in space that contains all other spaces at once. The work also presents the idea of infinite time. Borges writes in the original afterword, dated May 3, 1949 (Buenos Aires), that most of the stories belong to the genre of fantasy, mentioning themes such as identity and immortality. Borges added four new stories to the collection in the 1952 edition, for which he provided a brief postscript to the afterword. The story "La intrusa" (The Intruder) was first printed in the third edition of El Aleph (1966) and was later included in the collection El informe de Brodie (1970).

The 1970 English language reissue (translated and edited by Norman Thomas di Giovanni) also includes a new preface and commentaries by Borges & di Giovanni, and the Borges & di Giovanni collaboration "An Autobiographical Essay."

== Contents ==
- "The Immortal" ("El inmortal")
- "The Dead Man" ("El Muerto")
- "The Theologians" ("Los teólogos")
- "Story of the Warrior and the Captive" ("Historia del guerrero y la cautiva")
- "Biography of Tadeo Isidoro Cruz" ("Biografía de Tadeo Isidoro Cruz (1829–1874)")
- "Emma Zunz"
- "The House of Asterion" ("La casa de Asterión")
- "The Other Death" ("La otra muerte")
- "Deutsches Requiem" ("Deutsches réquiem")
- "Averroes's Search" ("La busca de Averroes")
- "The Zahir" ("El zahir")
- "The Writing of the God" ("La escritura del dios")
- "Ibn-Hakam al-Bokhari, Murdered in His Labyrinth" ("Abenjacán el Bojarí, muerto en su laberinto")
- "The Two Kings and the Two Labyrinths" ("Una leyenda arábiga" ("Historia de los dos reyes y los dos laberintos, como nota de Burton") )
- "The Wait" ("La espera")
- "The Man on the Threshold" ("El hombre en el umbral")
- "The Aleph" ("El Aleph")

== See also ==
- Bibliography of Jorge Luis Borges
