= María Kodama =

Argentine writer (1937–2023)

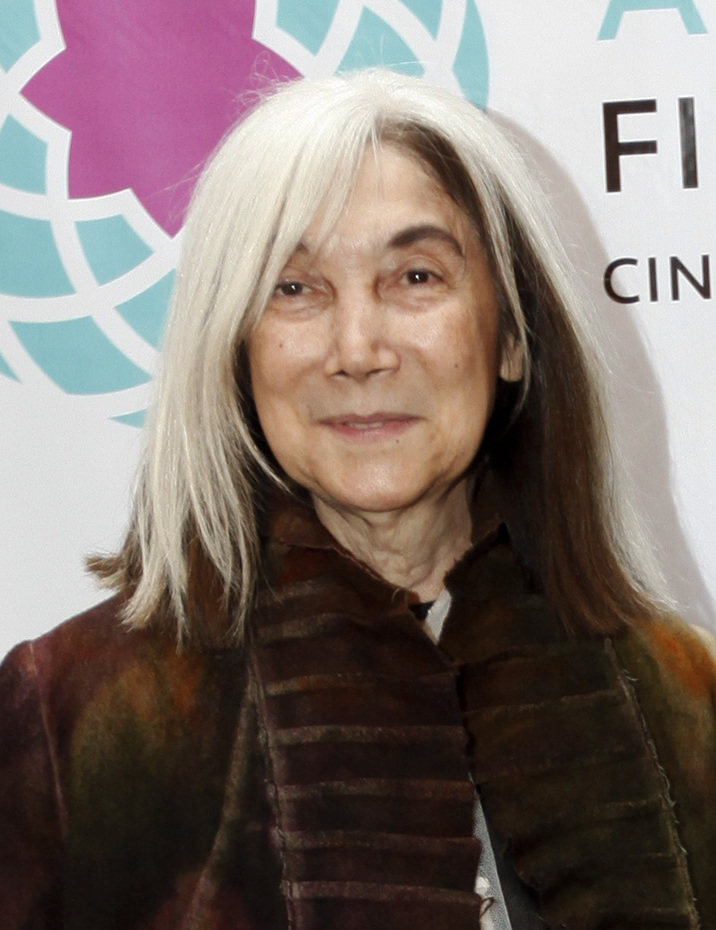
- Kodama in 2013
- Born: María Kodama Schweizer; 10 March 1937; Buenos Aires, Argentina
- Died: 26 March 2023 (aged 86); Vicente López, Buenos Aires Province, Argentina
- Occupations: Writer, translator

María Kodama Schweizer (10 March 1937 – 26 March 2023) was an Argentine writer and translator. The widow of author Jorge Luis Borges, she was the sole owner of his estate after his death in 1986. Borges had bequeathed to Kodama his rights as author in a will written in 1979, when she was his literary secretary, and bequeathed to her his whole estate in 1985. They were married in 1986, shortly before Borges's death.

== Biography ==
Kodama was the daughter of an Argentine mother of Swiss-German, English and Spanish descent and a Japanese father. She met Borges when she was a student, at one of his lectures in Buenos Aires on Icelandic literature.

After the death in 1975 of Borges's ninety-nine-year-old mother, Leonor Acevedo, with whom he had lived all his life, Kodama became Borges’s literary secretary and had the opportunity—at the invitation of Borges's caretaker, "Fanny"—to assist him as a blind old man in his frequent travels abroad during his later years, when he received many invitations by institutions from around the world. Kodama helped Borges write, as he had lost his sight. She collaborated with him in Breve antología anglosajona (1978) and Atlas (1984, an account of their travels together) and in the translation of the Younger Edda by Snorri Sturluson.

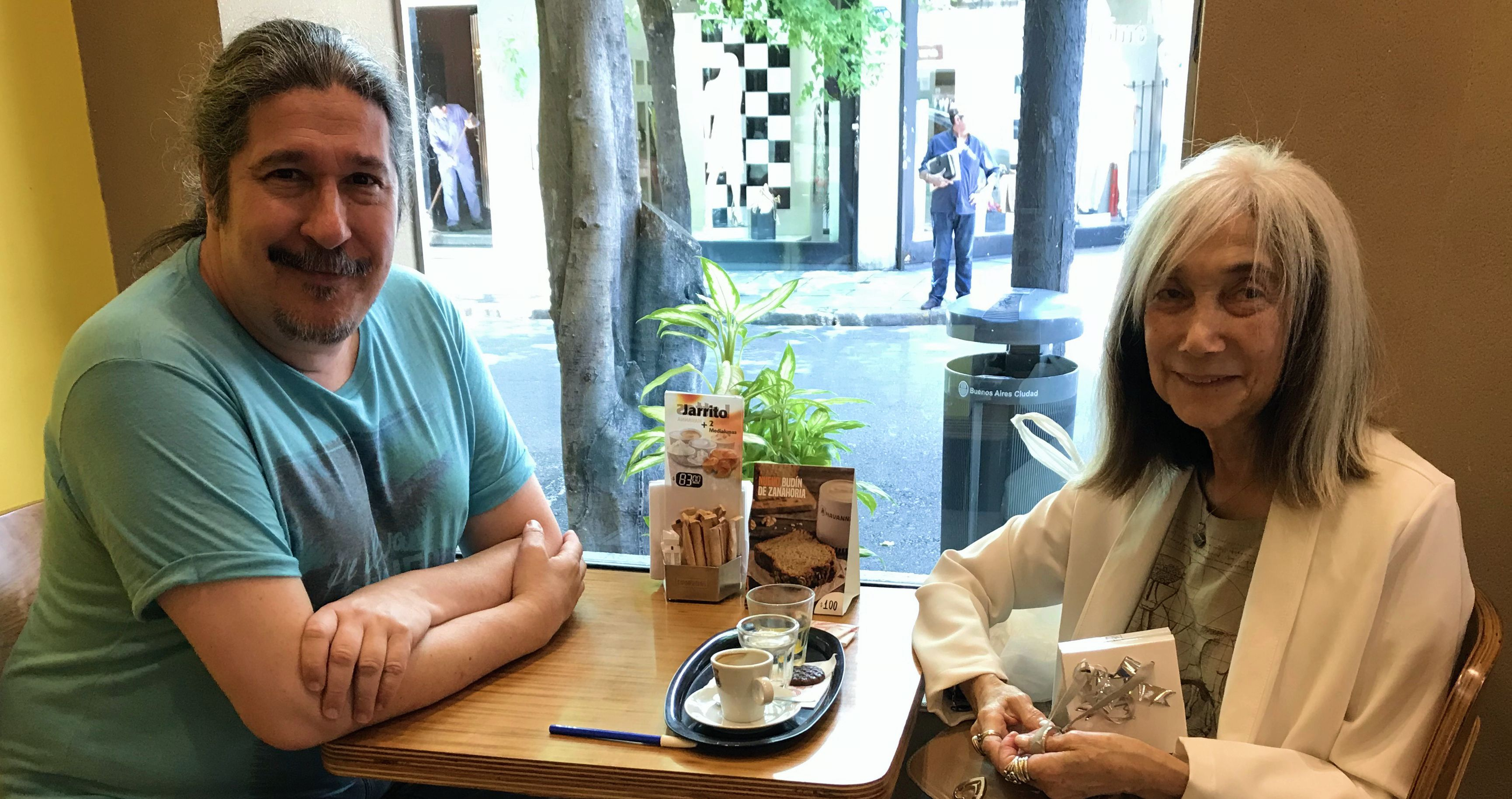
Kodama (right) with author Alejandro Pose Mayayo, 2017

Kodama married Borges through representatives in a civil proceeding in Paraguay on 26 April 1986. This was a common practice for Argentines wishing to circumvent the restrictions on divorce in their country at the time, and Borges was already married once but for many years estranged from his first wife. At the time of the wedding, Borges was terminally ill and died of cancer in Geneva, Switzerland, on 14 June 1986.

Kodama was president of the Fundación Internacional Jorge Luis Borges, which she founded in Buenos Aires in 1988.

After Borges's death, Kodama renegotiated the English translation rights of his works. In particular, she terminated a longstanding agreement between Borges and the translator Norman Thomas di Giovanni under which royalties for a number of translations on which they collaborated were divided equally between author and translator. New translations by Andrew Hurley were commissioned and published to replace the di Giovanni translations, which were allowed to go out of print.

Kodama's assertive administration of the Borges estate also resulted in a bitter dispute with the French publisher Gallimard regarding the republication of the complete works of Borges in French, with Pierre Assouline in Le Nouvel Observateur (August 2006) calling her "an obstacle to the dissemination of the works of Borges". Kodama took legal action against Assouline, considering the remark unjustified and defamatory, asking for a symbolic compensation of one euro.

Kodama died on 26 March 2023 at the age of 86, in Vicente López, Greater Buenos Aires. Kodama left no will and the status of Borges' work is uncertain.

== Bibliography ==
- Kodama, María (2020). Relatos. Alessandro Kokocinski, Editorial Lumen (Primera edición: marzo de 2020 ed.). Barcelona. ISBN 978-84-264-0749-8. OCLC 1198250455.
- Kodama, María (2016). Homenaje a Borges (Primera edición ed.). Barcelona. ISBN 978-84-264-0410-7. OCLC 968155827.
