= Margarita Guerrero =

Argentine writer

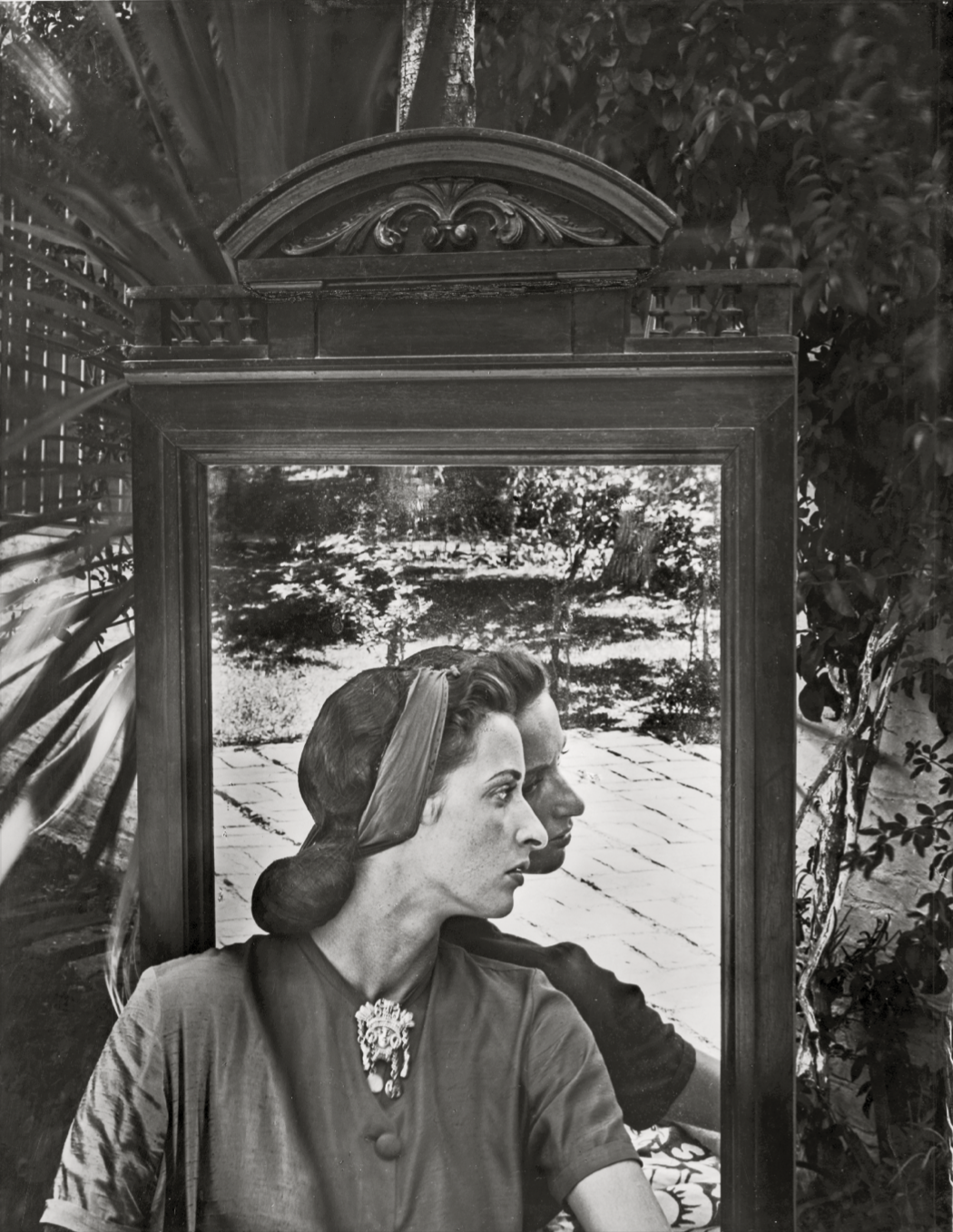
Margarita Guerrero, photographed by Grete Stern in 1942

Margarita Guerrero was an Argentine dancer and writer. She is known for her collaborations with Jorge Luis Borges, with whom she co-wrote and edited Book of Imaginary Beings and El "Martín Fierro". As his eyesight failed, Borges relied increasingly on collaborators in creating his work, of which Guerrero was one. Her role in Book of Imaginary Beings is thought to have been that of a researcher and compiler.

Borges dedicated Other Inquisitions, 1937–1952 to her under the name "Margot Guerrero".

She was interested in the occult.
