= The Encounter (short story) =

- Short story by Jorge Luis Borges
- Original title: El encuentro
- Country: Argentina
- Language: Spanish
- Genres: Fantasy, short story

Publication
- Published in: Imprenta de Francisco A. Colombo, Buenos Aires
- Media type: Print
- Publication date: 1969

"The Encounter" (original Spanish title: "El encuentro") is a 1969 short story by Argentine writer Jorge Luis Borges and later included in the collection "Dr. Brodie's Report", first published in 1970
