= The Man on the Threshold =

- Short story by Jorge Luis Borges
- Original title: El Hombre en el Umbral
- Country: Argentina
- Language: Spanish
- Genre: short story

Publication
- Published in: La Nación
- Media type: Print
- Publication date: April 1952

"The Man on the Threshold" (original Spanish title "El Hombre en el Umbral") is a short story by Argentine writer Jorge Luis Borges. It was published in La Nación in April 1952 and added to the 1952 edition of the short story collection Aleph.

== Plot summary ==
A new governor, a Scotsman named David Alexander Glencairn (possibly based on John Nicholson), is sent to a certain Muslim city in British India to restore order. He succeeds using violent measures, but after few years, mysteriously disappears. The narrator is assigned to find Glencairn. He goes to a certain address where a Muslim ceremony is being held. An old man on the threshold tells the narrator a story of a tyrant who was kidnapped and put to trial: he was judged by a madman and his verdict was death, which is implied to be the fate of Glencairn himself.

Daniel Balderston argues that the central theme of the short story is the search for justice that transcends religion or power systems set in place by the powerful.
