= The Two Kings and the Two Labyrinths =

- Short story by Jorge Luis Borges
- Original title: Historia de los dos reyes y los dos laberintos
- Country: Argentina
- Language: Spanish
- Genres: Fantasy, short story

Publication
- Published in: Obra
- Media type: Print
- Publication date: February 1936
- Pages: 2 (Bantam 1971 ed.)

"The Two Kings and the Two Labyrinths" (original Spanish title: "Historia de los dos reyes y los dos laberintos") is a short story by Argentine writer Jorge Luis Borges, first published in February 1936. It was later included in El Aleph under the title "Los dos reyes y los dos laberintos". It deals with a number of Borgesian themes: labyrinths, supposed obscure folk tales, Arabia, and Islam. The story is itself referenced in-universe by characters of Borges' "Ibn Hakkan Al-Bokhari—Dead in His Labyrinth", also found in The Aleph.

== Plot summary ==
A Babylonian king orders his subjects to build him a labyrinth "so confusing and so subtle that the most prudent men would not venture to enter it, and those who did would lose their way". When an Arab king visited his court, the king of Babylon told him to enter the labyrinth in order to mock him. The Arab king finally got out and told the Babylonian that in his land he had another labyrinth, and Allah willing, he would see that someday the king of Babylonia made its acquaintance. The Arab king returned to his land, and launched a successful attack on the Babylonians, finally capturing the Babylonian King. The Arab tied him on a camel and led him into the desert. After three days of riding, the Arab reminds the Babylonian that he tried to make him lose his way in his labyrinth and says that he will now show him his, "which has no stairways to climb, nor door to force, nor wearying galleries to wander through, nor walls to impede thy passage". He then untied the Babylonian king, "and abandoned him in the middle of the desert, where he died of hunger and thirst..."

== Bibliography ==
- Borges, Jorge Luis. The Two Kings and the Two Labyrinths.
