= Averroes's Search =

1947 short story by Jorge Luis Borges

"Averroës's Search"
- Short story by Jorge Luis Borges
- Original title: La Busca de Averroes
- Country: Argentina
- Language: Spanish
- Genre: Historical short story

Publication
- Published in: Sur
- Media type: Print
- Publication date: June 1947

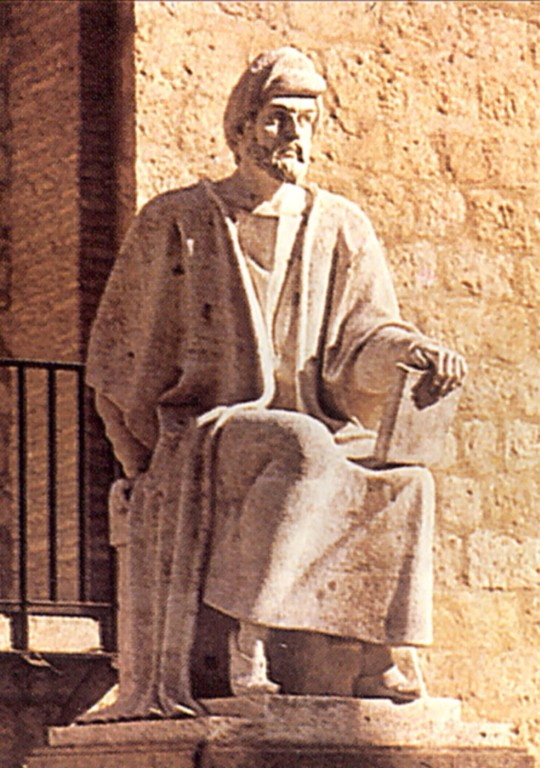
Statue of Averroes in Cordoba

"Averroës's Search" (original Spanish title: "La Busca de Averroes") is a 1947 short story by the Argentine writer Jorge Luis Borges. Originally published in the magazine Sur, it was later included in his second anthology of short stories, El Aleph.

== Plot summary ==
The story imagines the difficulty of Averroës, the famed Islamic philosopher and translator, in translating Aristotle's Poetics because he was not able to understand what a play was, owing to the absence of live theatrical performances from Averroës' cultural milieu, in contrast to that of ancient Greece. In the story, Averroës casually observes some children play-acting, then later hears a traveler ineptly describe an actual theatrical performance he once saw in a distant land, but still fails to understand that the tragedies and comedies of which Aristotle writes are a kind of performance art, rather than merely literature.

The process of writing the story is meant to parallel the events in the story itself; Borges writes in an afterword to the story that his attempt to understand Averroës was as doomed as Averroës's attempt to understand drama. "I felt that the work mocked me, foiled me, thwarted me. I felt that Averroës, trying to imagine what a play is without ever having suspected what a theater is, was no more absurd than I, trying to imagine Averroës yet with no more material than a few snatches from Renan, Lane, and Asín Palacios."

== Sources ==
- Shavit, Ayelet; Ellison, Aaron M., eds. (2017). Stepping in the Same River Twice: Replication in Biological Research. Yale University Press. pp. 28–30. ISBN 978-0-300-20954-9.
