= The Wait (short story) =

- Short story by Jorge Luis Borges
- Original title: La espera
- Country: Argentina
- Language: Spanish
- Genres: Mystery, thriller short story

Publication
- Published in: La Nación
- Media type: Print
- Publication date: 27 August 1950

"The Wait" (original Spanish title: "La espera", sometimes translated as "The Waiting") is a 1950 short story by Argentine writer Jorge Luis Borges. It was published in the collection The Aleph. David Foster Wallace referred to the story as "marvelous".

== Summary ==
In a riff on Ernest Hemingway's "The Killers", an Argentine mobster has fled Uruguay to Buenos Aires after an unknown fiasco, implied, via allusion to Dante's Divine Comedy and its version of the story of Ugolino della Gherardesca, to be a treasonous coup against a fellow mobster, a man named Alejandro Villari. Taking Villari's name, the mobster spends his days in a paranoid and purgatorial state in a small urban apartment. He avoids going in public save an occasional trip to the movie theatre, and mostly sits drinking his coffee and mate, reading Dante, befriending an elderly dog, and letting the days drift by. At night he dreams exclusively about the hitmen, Villari and another nameless man, who are coming to kill him. They eventually arrive one early morning while he is in bed. The story ends (save for a final sentence): "He gestured at them to wait, and he turned over and faced the wall, as though going back to sleep. Did he do that to awaken the pity of the men that killed him ... or ... so that his murderers would become a dream, as they had already been so many times...?"
