= The Gospel According to Mark (short story) =

"The Gospel according to Mark"
- Short story by Jorge Luis Borges
- Original title: El Evangelio según Marcos
- Country: Argentina
- Language: Spanish
- Genres: Fantasy, short story

Publication
- Media type: Print
- Publication date: 1970

"The Gospel according to Mark" (originally in Spanish "El Evangelio según Marcos") is a short story by the Argentine writer and poet Jorge Luis Borges. It is one of the stories in the short story collection Doctor Brodie's Report (originally in Spanish El informe de Brodie), first published in 1970.

== Plot summary ==
Baltasar Espinosa, a kindly but indifferent young medical student on holiday, gets trapped alone at his cousin's ranch in the Argentinian countryside during the rainy season. To pass the time he begins reading to the Gutres, the illiterate farm family that works at the house, though out of the few books available the only one that manages to keep their attention is an old dusty Bible. The Gutres family is captivated by the Gospel According to Saint Mark, which they are unfamiliar with, and ask Espinosa to read it to them repeatedly. After the Gutres' house suffers damage in a storm, Espinosa lets them move into the main house with him, giving them a room near the tool-shed. The shed's roof is also damaged soon after and the Gutres patriarch tells Espinosa they will repair the beams of the rafters.

The Gutres family becomes increasingly reverential towards Espinosa thanks to his Gospel readings and the assistance he provides, including treating an injured lamb cared for by the foreman's daughter. The girl later sleeps with Espinosa without speaking a word. The next day the foreman asks if the Roman soldiers who crucified Jesus were also granted salvation through Jesus's death, and Espinosa says yes, though he is uncertain if this is theologically correct. Later, they crucify the young student with the rafters from the roof.

== See also ==
- Longinus, the Roman soldier said to have pierced Jesus's side with a spear during the Crucifixion
