= The Writing of the God =

1949 short story by Jorge Luis Borges

- Short story by Jorge Luis Borges
- Original title: La escritura del dios
- Country: Argentina
- Language: Spanish
- Genres: Fantasy, short story

Publication
- Published in: Sur
- Media type: Print
- Publication date: February 1949

"The Writing of the God" (original Spanish title: "La escritura del dios", sometimes translated as "The God's Script") is a short story by Argentine writer Jorge Luis Borges. It was published in Sur in February 1949, and later reprinted in the collection The Aleph.

== Plot summary ==
The story is narrated by a Maya priest named Tzinacán, who is tortured by Pedro de Alvarado (who burned the pyramid Qaholom where the protagonist was a magician) and incarcerated, with a jaguar in the adjacent cell. Tzinacán searches for a divine script that will provide him omnipotence in the patterns of the animal's fur. While in the process of doing so, he has a dream in which he imagines himself drowning in sand, and awakes to a vision of an enormous wheel "made of water, but also of fire," which allows him to understand the patterns in the jaguar's fur. Tzinacán claims that the divine script is a formula of fourteen "apparently random" words, which upon speaking, will make his prison disappear and will set the jaguar upon Alvarado. The story ends with the narrator deciding not to say the words, however, because knowing the words has made him forget Tzinacán, whom he is content to let lie in prison.
