= There Are More Things =

- Short story by Jorge Luis Borges
- Country: Argentina
- Language: Spanish
- Genre: Short story

Publication
- Published in: The Book of Sand
- Media type: Print
- Publication date: 1975
- Published in English: 1977
- Pages: 9 (Dutton 1977 ed.)

"There Are More Things" is a short story written by Argentine writer Jorge Luis Borges in 1975. It was first published in the short story collection The Book of Sand, as the collection's fourth entry. The story tells of the encounter the narrator has with a monstrous entity inhabiting an equally monstrous house. It bears the dedication "In Memory of H. P. Lovecraft" and accordingly holds many parallels with Lovecraft's stories, employing similar plot devices. The title alludes to Hamlet's lines "There are more things in heaven and earth, Horatio, Than are dreamt of in your philosophy" (Hamlet I.5:159–167).

The story has been criticized because the episode of the encounter with the monster and the house—the heart of the story—which is described in the final two or so pages, is preceded by "eight pages of complicated subplots," spoiling "a basically sound idea." Borges himself was quite skeptical about his memorial to Lovecraft (as expressed in the book's epilogue), whom he in fact considered "an involuntary parodist of Poe."

== Plot summary ==
The story's protagonist, while in Austin, Texas, receives the news of the death of his uncle, Edwin Arnett, in Turdera, Argentina, south of Buenos Aires. Shortly after, Arnett's house is bought by a man called Max Preetorius. Preetorius immediately disposes of all the furniture and initiates a series of modifications in opposition to Alexander Muir, the architect responsible for the original design of the house and the late Arnett's best friend. The modifications are performed under unusual conditions—during the night with all the windows and doors closed. In addition, all trees within the bounds of the property are cut down.

The protagonist is surprised by these events, and travels to Lomas de Zamora to investigate. He asks Muir and Preetorius' carpenter about Preetorius' intentions, and about the purpose of the strange modifications. He is unable to obtain any relevant information.

He soon discovers that the inhabitants of the town deliberately avoid passing near the house. One of the locals tells him that one night, as his gaze wandered across the house's garden, he "saw something." It is also reported that a missing dog was found decapitated and mutilated on the lawn.

One rainy night, the protagonist is caught in the storm and is forced to enter the mysterious house; the front door is unexpectedly open. Once inside, his nose immediately detects what he describes as "a sweet, sickening smell."

Turning on the lights, he discovers strange, incomprehensible pieces of furniture, such as a long U-shaped desk with circular holes on opposite ends and a ladder with irregularly-spaced steps.

When it stops raining, the horrified protagonist decides to leave. He hears the house's occupant moving between him and the door, and realizes that he will have to pass by the creature in order to exit the house. His curiosity overcomes his fear and he does not close his eyes as he does so.
