= The Disk =

- Short story by Jorge Luis Borges
- Original title: El Disco
- Country: Argentina
- Language: Spanish
- Genres: Fantasy, short story

Publication
- Published in: The Book of Sand
- Media type: Print
- Publication date: 1975
- Published in English: 1977
- Pages: 4 (Dutton 1977 ed.)

"The Disk" is a 1975 short story written by Argentine writer Jorge Luis Borges. It appears in the collection The Book of Sand.

== Synopsis ==
The story deals with a woodcutter who lives in the midst of a deep wood in old England and who has never seen the sea. He tells the reader of the time a man appeared at his door and asked for lodging.

The woodcutter notes that the man was elderly, as the visitor referred to England as "Saxony" which was not in use at that time. The next day the visitor wishes to leave. Before he does, he claims that he is a King and is descended from Odin. He tells the woodcutter that he is exiled, but that he will always be a king because he holds the Disk of Odin.

The visitor claims the Disk of Odin is the sole thing in the world that has but one side. The visitor opens his hand and "shows" the disk. The woodcutter sees only an empty palm but when he touches it he feels a chill in his fingers and sees a flash. He lies that he has a full chest of gold and wants to trade it for the disk, but the visitor declines. When the visitor turns to leave, the woodcutter kills him with an axe and the visitor drops the disk face side down.

The woodcutter drags the visitor's body and throws it into the river. He then comes back and searches for the disk, which he never finds.

== See also ==
- Bibliography of Jorge Luis Borges
