= The Congress (short story) =

- Short story by Jorge Luis Borges
- Original title: El Congreso
- Country: Argentina
- Language: Spanish
- Genre: Short story

Publication
- Published in: The Book of Sand
- Media type: Print
- Publication date: 1971
- Published in English: 1974
- Pages: 23 (Dutton 1977 ed.)

"The Congress" (original Spanish title: "El Congreso") is a 1971 short story by Argentine writer Jorge Luis Borges. The story is on a utopic universal congress and is seen by some critics as a political essay.

It was first published in the short story collection The Book of Sand, with Borges claiming it to be "perhaps the most ambitious of the tales in this book." In Milan, Franco María Ricci published the story in a deluxe edition with the letters made of gold.

The Congress was Borges' favourite of his stories, or one of his favourites:

If of all my stories I had to save one, I would probably save the "The Congress", which at the same time is the most autobiographical (the one richest in memories) and the most imaginative.

— Jorge Luis Borges,

== Plot ==
Alejandro Ferri, the story's narrator, arrives at Buenos Aires in 1899 (Borges' birthdate). There he becomes a journalist and friends with José Fernández Irala, one of his colleagues. One day, Irala invites him to a meeting at "The Congress". Ferri correctly assumes that he isn't referring to the Argentine National Congress, but to something more exclusive.

At first, Ferri does not quite understand the purpose of "The Congress", which is led by an Uruguayan man called Alexander Glencoe. Slowly he goes discovering, throughout the meetings, that the motivation behind the organization is that of creating and sustaining a universal congress capable of representing all of humanity.

It is concluded that every group of human beings should have a representative. This leads to a dilemma: as any person fits into several categories, the members of what category should they represent? ("Don Alejandro Glencoe might represent not only cattlemen but also Uruguayans, and also human great forerunners and also men with red beards, and also those who are seated in armchairs.")

The second issue arises when it is pointed out that The Congress of the World should have its own library. Thus, two members are selected to settle which books should be included.

The third point that is considered is that of the official language under which The Congress should operate. Ferri himself and Fermín Eguren, whom Ferri disliked, are sent to London in search of information. Ferri considers Esperanto, Volapük, Latin, and the language invented by John Wilkins, but cannot manage to decide for one. In his stay at London, he falls in love with a woman named Beatrice Frost. Meanwhile, Glencoe starts building The Congress' official headquarters over some land he had in Uruguay.

On his return, Ferri discovers The Congress' warehouse to be full of all kinds of print text, as it was decided that every book, every magazine, every newspaper, every publication... was a testimony of mankind and thus indispensable to The Congress.

In an unexpected twist, Glencoe suddenly decides to dissolve The Congress and orders that all the books be burnt, as the scale of The Congress' scope rendered it both practically impossible and useless. "The Congress of the World began with the first moment of the world and it will go on when we are dust."
