= Biography of Tadeo Isidoro Cruz =

1944 short story by Jorge Luis Borges

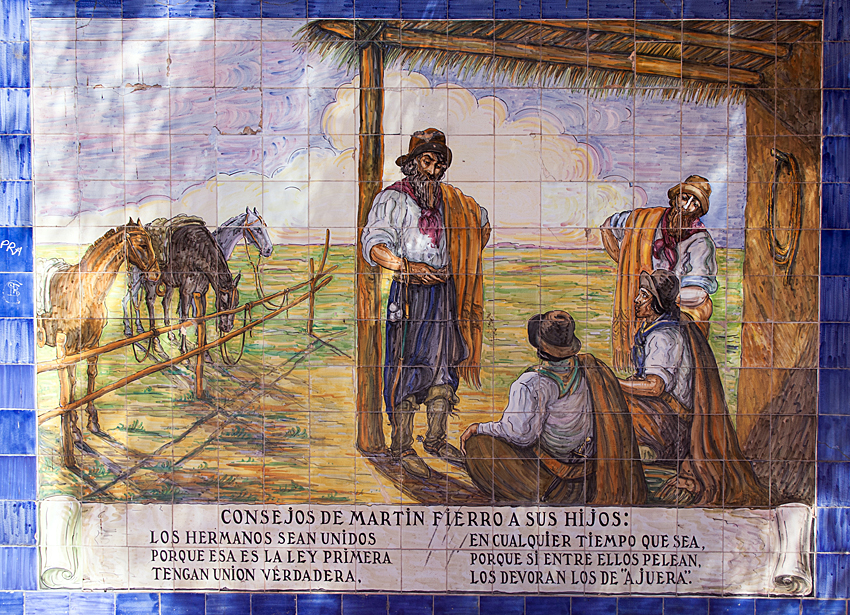
Tilework of Martín Fierro, a character in Biography of Tadeo Isidoro Cruz

"Biography of Tadeo Isidoro Cruz" (original Spanish title: Biografía de Tadeo Isidoro Cruz) is a short story by Argentine writer Jorge Luis Borges. The story was first published in the Argentine literary magazine Sur, December 1944, and later included in the short story collection The Aleph and Other Stories in 1949.

It is an example of intertextuality because it is a retelling of the story of Sergeant Cruz, an important character in the epic poem Martín Fierro by José Hernández.

It also contains references to various aspects of Argentine History, such as montoneros, the Cisplatine War, the Argentine Civil Wars, and culturally significant symbols of Argentina, such as the gaucho.

== Plot summary ==
The story starts by narrating the death of Tadeo Isidoro Cruz, who was killed by a "saber used in the wars of Peru and Brazil". The narrator claims that he will not proceed to tell the whole life of Cruz, instead he will only tell the parts of his story that are necessary to understand his death.

The narrator says Cruz was raised in the plains of the Pampas and he had never seen a mountain or a mill. One time in 1849 he went to Buenos Aires and stayed indoors sleeping, drinking mate and praying because he did not like the city. A drunken laborer made fun of him, and despite not reacting angrily, days later by a fireside, Cruz stabbed the laborer with a knife, killing him.

The police were looking for him, he was hidden in the bushes of a shrubland when the screaming of a Chajá (a South American bird) alerted him that the police had found him. Instead of surrendering he fought against the police bravely and was only stopped when he fainted due to the loss of blood after harming some of the policemen.

In that time, people could be drafted into the army as a criminal punishment. He went on to fight in the civil wars as a soldier, sometimes for his native province and sometimes against it.

in 1868 he had a son with a woman in the town of Pergamino. In 1869 he became seargeant of the rural police, the narrator claims he could have considered himself to be happy in that time, although not profoundly.

In the last days of June 1870, Cruz received the order to arrest a criminal who had deserted the army and killed two men. One night the police cornered the criminal who was hiding in a bush. A chajá (just like before) screamed and alerted the criminal that he was found, then he fought the police. The criminal wounded or killed many of the policemen led by Cruz. Cruz admired the bravery of the criminal and saw himself reflected in him, he threw his kepi on the ground and screamed that he would not "consent to the crime of killing a brave man". Cruz then joined the criminal and fought until his death alongside the criminal and against the policemen he was leading. This is how Cruz died and in the ending of the story it is revealed that the criminal was Martín Fierro, the protagonist of the national epic Martín Fierro by José Hernández, and therefore the protagonist of the short story is Sargento Cruz from that poem.

== Reinterpretation of Martín Fierro ==
Borges appreciated Martín Fierro as an "adventure story", he read it hidden from his mother when he was young, because she considered José Hernández to be an enemy of their family's ancestors, due to the fact that Hernández was Federalist and Borges' ancestors were Unitarians.

While Borges enjoyed Martín Fierro, he also considered it was a mistake to have given it the status of National Epic of Argentina. Martín Fierro was an outlaw, a killer and a deserter. He considered that Argentine intellectuals such as Leopoldo Lugones (who was the main thinker behind making Martín Fierro into the National Epic) should have picked Facundo or some other work that could have been a better moral guide for the nation.

== See also ==
- Literature of Argentina
- Historical Fiction
- Gaucho Literature
