= The Aleph (short story) =

1945 short story by Jorge Luis Borges

- Short story by Jorge Luis Borges
- Original title: El Aleph
- Country: Argentina
- Language: Spanish

Publication
- Published in: Sur
- Publication date: September 1945
- Pages: 15 (Bantam 1971 ed.)

"The Aleph" (Spanish: El Aleph) is a short story by Argentine writer and poet Jorge Luis Borges. First published in September 1945, it was reprinted in the short story collection The Aleph and Other Stories in 1949, and revised by the author in 1974.

== Plot summary ==
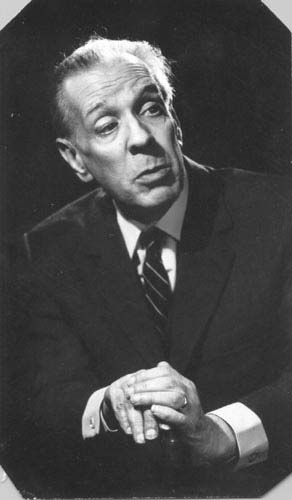
Borges in 1967

In Borges' story, the Aleph is a point in space that contains all other points. Anyone who gazes into it can see everything in the universe from every angle simultaneously, without distortion, overlapping, or confusion. The story traces the theme of infinity found in several of Borges' other works, such as "The Book of Sand". Borges has stated that the inspiration for this story came from H. G. Wells' short stories "The Crystal Egg" and "The Door in the Wall". In Volume 2, N°4 (July–December 2013) of the journal of the North American Academy of the Spanish Language, the Argentine writer Fernando Sorrentino published an article in which he reported the existence of a story almost identical to The Aleph by the Argentine writer Eduarda Mansilla. This story, entitled El ramito de romero, was published in 1883 in the book Creaciones, and its content is strikingly similar to Borges' text; in this article he mentions that the discovery belongs to Maria Gabriela Mizraje. Even the famous and extensive vision at the end shares the same verb tense: "I saw... I saw..." According to Sorrentino, El ramito de romero (of which Borges knew, he claims) condensed all The Aleph.

As in many of Borges' short stories, the protagonist is a fictionalized version of the author. At the beginning of the story, he is mourning the recent death of Beatriz Viterbo, a woman he loved, and he resolves to stop by the house of her family to pay his respects. Over time, he comes to know her first cousin, Carlos Argentino Daneri, a mediocre poet with a vastly exaggerated view of his own talent who has made it his lifelong quest to write an epic poem that describes every single location on the planet in excruciatingly fine detail.

Later in the story, a business attempts to tear down Daneri's house in the course of its expansion. Daneri becomes enraged, explaining to the narrator that he must keep the house in order to finish his poem, because the cellar contains "the Aleph", which he is using to write the poem. Though by now he believes Daneri to be insane, the narrator proposes to come to the house and see the Aleph for himself.

Left alone in the darkness of the cellar, the narrator begins to fear that Daneri is conspiring to kill him, and then he sees the Aleph for himself:

On the back part of the step, toward the right, I saw a small iridescent sphere of almost unbearable brilliance. At first I thought it was revolving; then I realised that this movement was an illusion created by the dizzying world it bounded. The Aleph's diameter was probably little more than an inch, but all space was there, actual and undiminished. Each thing (a mirror's face, let us say) was infinite things, since I distinctly saw it from every angle of the universe. I saw the teeming sea; I saw daybreak and nightfall; I saw the multitudes of America; I saw a silvery cobweb in the center of a black pyramid; I saw a splintered labyrinth (it was London); I saw, close up, unending eyes watching themselves in me as in a mirror; I saw all the mirrors on earth and none of them reflected me; I saw in a backyard of Soler Street the same tiles that thirty years before I'd seen in the entrance of a house in Fray Bentos; I saw bunches of grapes, snow, tobacco, lodes of metal, steam; I saw convex equatorial deserts and each one of their grains of sand...

Though staggered by the experience of seeing the Aleph, the narrator pretends to have seen nothing in order to get revenge on Daneri, whom he dislikes, by giving Daneri a reason to doubt his own sanity. The narrator tells Daneri that Daneri has lived too long amongst the noise and bustle of the city and spent too much time in the dark and enclosed space of his cellar, and the narrator assures him that what he truly needs are the wide open spaces and fresh air of the countryside, and these will provide him with the true peace of mind that he needs to complete his poem. He then takes his leave of Daneri and exits the house.

In a postscript to the story, Borges explains that Daneri's house was ultimately demolished, but that a selection from Daneri's epic poem was eventually published and that Daneri himself won second place for the Argentine National Prize for Literature as a result. He also states his belief that the Aleph in Daneri's house was "a false Aleph". Borges then defends this claim by citing many similar instances from legend and literature where objects were inaccurately perceived to be Alephs.

== See also ==
- A in Buddhism
- As above, so below
- Auguries of Innocence by William Blake
- Indra's net
- Logos
- Monad (philosophy)
- Om
- The Book of Sand by Jorge Luis Borges
- The Zahir by Jorge Luis Borges
