= Dreamtigers =

Writings by Jorge Luis Borges

First English edition (publ. University of Texas Press)

Dreamtigers (El Hacedor, "The Maker", 1960) is a collection of poems, short essays and literary sketches by the Argentine author Jorge Luis Borges. Divided fairly evenly between prose and verse, the collection examines the limitations of creativity. Borges regarded Dreamtigers as his most personal work. In the view of Mortimer Adler, editor of the Great Books of the Western World series, the collection was a masterpiece of 20th-century literature. Literary critic Harold Bloom includes it in his Western Canon.

The original Spanish title refers to the Scots word makar, meaning "poet".

Andrew Hurley, translator of a later published English translation, titled the collection The Maker, based on information that Borges "had thought up the title in English: The Maker, and had translated it into Spanish as El hacedor, but when the book came out in the United States the American translator preferred to avoid the theological implications and used instead the title of one of the pieces: Dreamtigers".

== Works ==
=== Sketches ===
Spanish title	English title
"El hacedor"	"The Maker"
"Dreamtigers"	"Dreamtigers"
"Diálogo sobre un diálogo"	"A Dialog About a Dialog"
"Las uñas"	"Toenails"
"Los espejos velados"	"Covered Mirrors"
"Argumentum ornitologicum"	"Argumentum Ornithologicum"
"El cautivo"	"The Captive"
"El simulacro"	"The Mountebank"
"Delia Elena San Marco"	"Delia Elena San Marco"
"Diálogo de muertos"	"A Dialog Between Dead Men"
"La trama"	"The Plot"
"Un problema"	"A Problem"
"Una rosa amarilla"	"The Yellow Rose"
"El testigo"	"The Witness"
"Martín Fierro"	"Martín Fierro"
"Mutations"	"Mutations"
"Parábola de Cervantes y del Quijote"	"Parable of Cervantes and the Quixote"
"Paradiso XXXI, 108"	"Paradiso XXXI, 108"
"Parábola del palacio"	"Parable of the Palace"
"Everything and Nothing"	"Everything and Nothing"
"Ragnarök"	"Ragnarök"
"Inferno, I, 32"	"Inferno, I, 32"
"Borges y yo"	"Borges and I"

=== Poetry ===
Spanish title	English title
"Poema de los dones"	"Poem about Gifts"
"El reloj de arena"	"The Hourglass"
"Ajedrez"	"The Game of Chess"
"Los espejos"	"Mirrors"
"Elvira de Alvear"	"Elvira de Alvear"
"Susana Soca"	"Susana Soca"
"La luna"	"The Moon"
"La lluvia"	"The Rain"
"A la efigie de un capitán de los ejércitos de Cromwell"	"On the Effigy of a Captain in Cromwell's Armies"
"A un viejo poeta"	"To an Old Poet"
"El otro tigre"	"The Other Tiger"
"Blind Pew"	"Blind Pew"
"Alusión a una sombra de mil ochocientos noventa y tantos"	"Referring to a Ghost of Eighteen Hundred and Ninety-Odd"
"Alusión a la muerte del coronel Francisco Borges (1833-74)"	"Referring to the Death of Colonel Francisco Borges (1835-1874)"
"In memoriam A.R."	"In Memoriam: A. R."
"Los Borges"	"The Borges"
"A Luis de Camoens"	"To Luis de Camoëns"
"Mil novecientos veintitantos"	"Nineteen Hundred and Twenty-Odd"
"Oda compuesta en 1960"	"Ode Composed in 1960"
"Ariosto y los árabes"	"Ariosto and the Arabs"
"Al iniciar el estudio de la gramática anglosajona"	"On Beginning the Study of Anglo-Saxon Grammar"
"Lucas, XXIII"	"Luke XXIII"
"Adrogué"	"Adrogué"
"Arte poética"	"Ars Poetica"

=== Museum ===
Spanish title	English title
"Del rigor en la ciencia"	"On Rigor in Science"
"Cuarteta"	"Quatrain"
"Límites"	"Limits"
"El poeta declara su nombradía"	"The Poet Declares His Renown"
"El enemigo generoso"	"The Magnanimous Enemy"
"Le regret d'Héraclite"	"The Regret of Heraclitus"
"In memoriam J.F.K."	"In memoriam J.F.K."
