= The Book of Sand (short story collection) =

1975 book by Jorge Luis Borges

- First English edition (publ. Dutton)
- Author: Jorge Luis Borges
- Original title: El libro de arena
- Translator: Norman Thomas di Giovanni
- Language: Spanish
- Genre: Fantasy, horror, science fiction
- Publisher: Emecé Editores
- Publication date: 1975
- Publication place: Argentina
- English publication date: 1977
- Media type: Print
- Pages: 181

The Book of Sand (Spanish: El libro de arena) is a 1975 short story collection by Argentine writer Jorge Luis Borges. In the author's opinion, the collection, written relatively late in his career—and while blind—is his best book. This opinion is not shared by most critics, many of whom prefer his other works such as those in Ficciones (1944).

Referring to the collection, Borges said:

I have wanted to be loyal, in these exercises of a blind man, to the example of Wells: the conjunction of a plain style, sometimes almost oral, and an impossible argument.

The first edition, published in Buenos Aires by Emecé, contained 181 pages. In Madrid it was edited that year by Ultramar.

Borges opts for an epilogue to this short story collection, different from the cases of his previous collections The Garden of Forking Paths (1941) and Artifices (1944) (later republished together in Ficciones), which had a prologue. Regarding this, Borges begins The Book of Sand's epilogue by saying: "To prologue unread stories is an almost impossible work, as it demands the analysis of plots one should not anticipate. I prefer, thus, an epilogue."

== Content ==
The book contains thirteen short stories (original titles in italics):

- The Other (El Otro)
- Ulrikke (Ulrica)
- The Congress (El Congreso)
- There Are More Things (There Are More Things)
- The Sect of the Thirty (La Secta de los Treinta)
- The Night of the Gifts (La noche de los dones)
- The Mirror and the Mask (El espejo y la máscara)
- Undr (Undr)
- A Weary Man's Utopia (Utopía de un hombre que está cansado)
- The Bribe (El soborno)
- Avelino Arredondo (Avelino Arredondo)
- The Disk (El disco)
- The Book of Sand (El libro de arena)

Among this collection are: The Other, the first story of the collection, in which the protagonist (Borges himself) encounters a younger version of himself (similar to his later short story August 25, 1983), The Congress, on an utopic universal congress (seen by critics as a political essay), There Are More Things, written in memory of H. P. Lovecraft, on an encounter with a monstrous extraterrestrial inhabiting an equally monstrous house, Undr, on the maximum poetic synthesis, The Sect of the Thirty, on an ancient manuscript that tells of the characteristics of a sect that equally venerated Jesus Christ and Judas Iscariot, A Weary Man's Utopia (according to Borges, "the most honest and melancholic piece in the collection"), The Disk, on a one-sided coin, and the titular work The Book of Sand, on a book with infinite pages.

Evaluating his work, Borges said:

If of all my stories I had to save one, I would probably save "The Congress", which at the same time is the most autobiographical (the one richest in memories) and the most imaginative.
