= Borges on Martín Fierro =

Book by Jorge Luis Borges

First edition (publ. Editorial Columba, Buenos Aires)

Borges on Martín Fierro concerns Argentine Jorge Luis Borges's comments on José Hernández's nineteenth-century poem Martín Fierro. Like most of his compatriots, Borges was a great admirer of this work, which he often characterized as the one clearly great work in Argentine literature. Because Martín Fierro has been widely considered (beginning with Leopoldo Lugones's El Payador, 1916) the fountainhead or pinnacle of Argentine literature, Argentina's Don Quixote or Divine Comedy, and because Borges was certainly Argentina's greatest twentieth-century writer, Borges's 1953 book of essays about the poem and its critical and popular reception–El "Martín Fierro" (written with Margarita Guerrero)—gives insight into Borges's identity as an Argentine.

The poem's central character, Martín Fierro, is a gaucho, a free, poor, pampas-dweller, who is illegally drafted to serve at a border fort defending against Indian attacks. He eventually deserts, and becomes a gaucho matrero, basically the Argentine equivalent of a North American western outlaw.

In his book of essays, Borges displays his typical concision, evenhandedness, and love of paradox, but he also places himself in the spectrum of views of Martín Fierro and, thus, effectively, gives a clue as to his (Borges's) relation to nationalist myth. Borges has nothing but praise for the aesthetic merit of Martín Fierro, but refuses to project that as indicating moral merit for its protagonist. In particular, he describes it as sad that his countrymen read "with indulgence or admiration", rather than horror, the famous episode in which Fierro provokes a duel of honor with a black gaucho and then kills him in the ensuing knife fight.

== Borges on "gauchesque" poetry ==
Borges emphasizes that "gauchesque" poetry was not poetry written by gauchos, but generally by educated urban writers who adopted the eight-syllable line of the rural payadas (ballads), but often filled them with folksy expressions and with accounts of daily life that had no place in the "serious and even solemn" payadas. He views these works as a successful impersonation, facilitated by the interpenetration of rural and urban cultures, especially in the Argentine military. The author of Martín Fierro was one of the few gauchesque poets who ever actually lived as a gaucho.

Borges has far more respect for the early gauchesque poets than does Lugones, whom Borges sees as reducing them to mere precursors, "sacrificing them to the greater glory of Martín Fierro". In this respect, Borges singles out the "happy and valiant" poetry of Ascasubi, which he contrasts to Hernández's tragic lament. Borges clearly relishes the paradox that Ascasubi, a soldier with extensive experience of combat and whose work sometimes borders on the autobiographical, is at his most vivid in describing the Indian invasion of Buenos Aires province, which Ascasubi did not witness.

Borges is somewhat less impressed with Estanislao del Campo, author of Fausto, whom he characterizes as the most rural of the gauchesque poets in his diction, but the least comprehending of the mindset of the pampas-dweller. In contrast, he points out that Hernández is much closer to the language (if not the subject matter) of the payadas, relying far more on dialect spellings than exotic words to create his atmosphere, and, in the scenes within his poem where payadas are sung, showing his ability to write strictly within the payada form.

== Borges on the critics and Martín Fierro ==
Borges sees Lugones in El Payador (1916) as operating in an explicitly nationalist tradition, seeking a national epic to take the role of Don Quixote or the Divine Comedy and render the Argentines a "people of the book", in a nationalist reflection of religious identity. Borges shows no small sympathy for Lugones, but argues that Martín Fierro is more of a verse novel than an epic, and very much a work of its time (the 1870s). Borges has far less sympathy with those who go beyond Lugones, such as Ricardo Rojas who wants to see in Martín Fierro literal or metaphorical analogues for almost every aspect of Argentine history and moral character, praising the work mostly for aspects that Borges finds "conspicuous by their absence."

Borges is in more sympathy with Calixto Oyuela, who sees Martín Fierro as a tragic lament for the passing of the gaucho life and the fading of the Spanish-descended criollos into the emerging multi-ethnic Argentina. He also speaks briefly, but with praise, of Vicente Rossi, who sees Martín Fierro more as an orillero (hoodlum) than as a gaucho. Borges mildly rebukes Miguel de Unamuno for denying the specifically Argentine character of the work, annexing it to Spanish literature, and is absolutely scathing on the subject of Eleuterio Tiscornia. Tiscornia's excessively academic and Europeanizing approach to Martín Fierro produced a footnoted edition of the poem which Borges finds, at points, laughably misleading. Taking only a few well-aimed swipes at Tiscornia on his own behalf, Borges refers his readers to the work of Ezequiel Martínez Estrada for a proper demolition.

== Borges on Martín Fierro ==
As remarked above, Borges greatly admired Martín Fierro as a work of art, but did not particularly admire its protagonist. In El "Martín Fierro", he dissents from Lugones's nationalist cult of the epic, but professes to admire Martín Fierro all the more in its aspect as a verse novel, concise and full of morally complex characters very much of a particular place and time. He sees in Hernández's work a confluence of two Argentine literary traditions that previous critics had generally not distinguished: the rural payada and a separate and more artificial tradition of gauchesque poetry.

Both in his commentary on Martín Fierro and on its critics, Borges effectively positions himself, like Hernández, at a confluence of two literary traditions with common roots. In Borges's own case, these are an Argentine national tradition and one more European. While clearly standing as a proud Argentine, he refuses to be placed in the position of glorifying even what he sees as flaws in the Argentine character.
