= Shakespeare's Memory =

- Short story by Jorge Luis Borges
- Original title: La memoria de Shakespeare
- Country: Argentina
- Language: Spanish
- Genres: Fantasy, short story

Publication
- Media type: Print
- Publication date: 1983

"Shakespeare's Memory" (original Spanish title: "La memoria de Shakespeare") is a short story by Argentine writer Jorge Luis Borges originally published in 1983, in the book of the same name. This is one of Borges' (who died a few years after writing it) last stories, but it differs little, both thematically and stylistically from the much earlier stories that made him famous.

The story follows a Shakespeare scholar who acquires Shakespeare's memory, realizes that his previous analysis of Shakespeare's work was lacking, and meditates on the nature of memory and its connection to creativity.

== Plot ==
The protagonist and narrator is Hermann Sörgel, a self-described devotee of Shakespeare. After giving a short list of works that he has written on Shakespeare, he tells the story of how he came to be in possession of Shakespeare's Memory: He meets a man named Daniel Thorpe at a Shakespeare conference, and after relating a story about a ring that had a price so high it could never be sold, Thorpe then offers Sörgel Shakespeare's memory, and after a short retelling of how he managed to get hold of it, passes it on to him. The memory, Thorpe says, has to be 'discovered': Sörgel whistles melodies he has never heard, and slowly starts seeing unknown faces in his dreams. Later, he gains insights into Shakespeare's works and techniques, and considers but decides against writing a biography. Soon after, Shakespeare's memory almost overwhelms his own: one day he becomes confused as he does not recognise engines and cars. Finally he decides to give away the memory by telephone: he phones random numbers (sparing women and children from the memory), and at last gives the memory to a man on the other end of the phone.
