= Borges and I =

- Short story by Jorge Luis Borges
- Original title: Borges y Yo
- Country: Argentina
- Language: Spanish
- Genres: Fantasy, short story

Publication
- Media type: Print

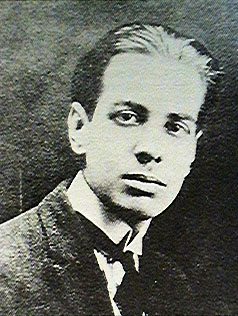
Jorge Luis Borges

"Borges and I" (originally in Spanish "Borges y Yo") is a short story by the Argentine writer and poet Jorge Luis Borges. It is one of the stories in the short story collection The Maker (originally in Spanish El Hacedor), first published in 1960.

== Plot ==
The narrative hinges on Borges's self-perception as a writer, underscoring the difference between the private self that cannot recognize his persona or public mask as a famous storyteller. The former insists that he has nothing to do with the task of writing, that only Borges alone imagines the stories and completes the work of setting them down on paper. His determined attempts to fight these claims are useless since he always loses to the celebrated author. Indeed, whatever he does to extricate himself from Borges becomes irrevocably tied to Borges.

== Background ==
Borges was born August 24, 1899, in Buenos Aires, Argentina. In 1914, Borges's family moved to Switzerland where he studied at the Collège de Genève. The family traveled widely in Europe, including stays in Spain. On his return to Argentina in 1921, Borges began publishing his poems and essays in surrealist literary journals. He also worked as a librarian and public lecturer. In 1955 he was appointed director of the National Public Library (Biblioteca Nacional) and professor of Literature at the University of Buenos Aires.

== Philosophical implications ==
Borges's story raises many philosophical questions of Self and epistemology. Viewed through the analytic lens of Russell's knowledge by description, the story explores the interesting concept of knowledge of Self by description (as opposed to the more expected knowledge by acquaintance). This is emphasized by the mention of receiving Borges's mail and reading about Borges in a book.

Also, the distinction between persona and Self can be interpreted as a distinction between author and writer. The author would be analogous to the persona and Borges. The writer would be the Self and "I". Theoretically, the writer could be anyone, it just happens to be Borges. With this interpretation Borges is seen to be commenting on the cognitive differences between processing third person information and first person information.

== English translations ==
Multiple professional and academic translators have developed English-language translations of the story, the most notable of these being the versions by Andrew Hurley, James E. Irby, Ilan Stavans, and Kenneth Krabbenhoft, all of which have been published in notable collections of Borges's work and Latin American poetry. There are also many amateur translations, as might be expected of a story of its brevity and popularity, and there exist, of course, many disagreements and criticisms over aspects of the text, as with any translation of prose or poetry.

Hurley, who is renowned for his 'widely acclaimed' translations of Borges's work, has written an essay on the subject of translating Borges, and what difficulties there are in trying to recreate for an English-speaker the effect that the original Spanish has on a native speaker of said language; he also discusses what is 'lost in translation', and what he could have done better in his own translations, addressing some of the criticisms made against him.

== See also ==
- Existentialism
- Postmodern literature
