= Emma Zunz =

Short story by Argentine writer Jorge Luis Borges

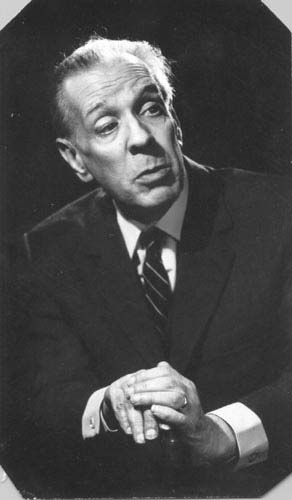
Jorge Luis Borges

"Emma Zunz" is a short story by Argentine writer Jorge Luis Borges. The tale recounts how its eponymous heroine avenges the death of her father. Originally published in September 1948 in the magazine Sur, it was reprinted in Borges' 1949 collection The Aleph. The story deals with the themes of justice and revenge, and of right and wrong. As in several other short stories, Borges illustrates the difficulty in understanding and describing reality. The story relies on issues of deceit, self-deception and inauthenticity to illustrate this. According to what Borges wrote in the epilogue of The Aleph, the plot of this story was communicated to him by his friend Cecilia Ingenieros. It was translated into English by Donald A. Yates and published in Labyrinths (New Directions, 1962).

== Plot ==
Emma Zunz, a worker at a textile mill, returns home and finds a letter indicating that her father has died in hospital after a Veronal overdose. Emma, overwhelmed by grief, believes that her father has in fact committed suicide. She recalls how her father told her that the textile mill owner Aaron Loewenthal was guilty of an embezzlement charge which led to her father's unjust arrest, and she plots revenge.

On the following weekend, Emma calls Loewenthal, claiming she has information about an impending strike and agrees to meet him that night. In the afternoon she seduces a Scandinavian man at a bar who pays her for a sexual encounter. The encounter disgusts Emma but she continues with her plan.

She meets Loewenthal at the factory and pretends to report on workers involved in the strike. He leaves his office to get a glass of water, at which point Emma takes a revolver from his desk and murders him. She then calls the police, claiming that Aaron Loewenthal was abusing her and that she killed him in retaliation. The remains of Emma's disgust from the earlier encounter allow her to speak convincingly.

The story ends with the narrator noting that Emma's emotions were true, only the exact circumstances, time and names were false.

== Screen adaptations ==
Various films have been based on Borges' "Emma Zunz":

- Zunz (2016) (UK) directed by Simeon Lumgair.
- Emma Zunz (1993) (Spain) directed for television by Benoît Jacquot.
- Emma Zunz (1985) (Mexico) directed by Giangiacomo Tabet.
- Emma Zunz (1984) (Holland) directed by Peter Delpeut.
- Emma Zunz (1979) (Canada) directed by Isabel Beveridge.
- Emma Zunz (1966) (Spain) directed by Jesús Martínez León.
- Días de odio (1954) (Argentina) directed by Leopoldo Torre Nilsson.
