= The Other (short story) =

- Short story by Jorge Luis Borges
- Original title: El otro
- Country: Argentina
- Language: Spanish
- Genres: Fantasy, short story

Publication
- Published in: The Book of Sand
- Publisher: Imprenta de Francisco A. Colombo, Buenos Aires
- Media type: Print
- Publication date: 1972
- Pages: 10 (Dutton 1977 ed.)
- Series: 12

"The Other" (original Spanish title: "El otro") is a 1972 short story by Argentine writer Jorge Luis Borges (1899-1986), collected in the anthology The Book of Sand (1975, English translation 1977).

The story is an ostensibly autobiographical account of Borges meeting his younger, 19-year-old self. The young and old versions of Borges disagree on their approaches to fiction and poetry, as well as their attitude toward communism. The story is based on Giovanni Papini's Two Reflections in a Pond, and also parallels Fyodor Dostoevsky's The Double: A Petersburg Poem, which is referenced in the story itself.

== Plot summary ==
A meeting between an older Borges and a younger Borges occurs in Cambridge, Massachusetts. In the dialogue that results, the young man refers to the novella The Double: A Petersburg Poem by Dostoevsky. While the younger man cites his romantic vision about a brotherhood of man, the older Borges reveals his doubt about the existence of a single man. Following incorrect information that the first provides, elder Borges concludes that it is a real episode for him, but a dream for the younger.
