= The Theologians =

Short story by Jorge Luis Borges

"The Theologians" (original title: "Los teólogos") is a short story by Argentine writer Jorge Luis Borges. It was featured in the collection Labyrinths. It was originally published in Los Annales de Buenos Aires in April 1947 and appears in the 1949 short story collection The Aleph.

== Plot ==
The story follows Aureliano and John of Panonia, who compete with one another as theologians. Though much of their work is a thinly veiled criticism of one another, the topic of their writing is regarding the heretical factions that appear around them such as the Monotoni, whose heresy is to preach that "history is a circle, and that all things have existed and will exist again", and the Histrioni, who argue that all individuals occupy dual forms – one on earth and one in heaven – and that actions on earth influence heaven.

Though at first, Aureliano struggles to put to words the nature of their heresy, he is surprised when a subconscious sentence springs forward that efficiently describes their beliefs. Upon closer consideration, he realizes that the sentence was taken from an old text written by John and that such a text could be considered heretical. Aurelian identifies John as the text's author and the latter is sentenced to death. John is burnt at the stake for heresy, and Aurelian later dies in a fire caused by a lightning strike. The narrator notes that the remainder of the story is rife with metaphor since it must take place in heaven, but considers the possibility that in the eyes of an ineffable divine intelligence, both Aureliano and John of Panonia may appear to be a single person.
