= Deutsches Requiem (short story) =

Short story by Jorge Luis Borges

- Short story by Jorge Luis Borges
- Country: Argentina
- Language: Spanish

Publication
- Publisher: Sur
- Publication date: February 1946

"Deutsches Requiem" is a short story by Argentine author Jorge Luis Borges.

Published in Sur in February 1946, it was reprinted in the collection El Aleph (1949). It is the fictional last testament of Otto Dietrich zur Linde, the one-legged commandant of a Nazi concentration camp. After being tried and convicted of crimes against humanity, zur Linde reflects on his own sins and those of Nazi Germany while he awaits the firing squad. The short story was translated into English by Julian Palley and published in New World Writing N° 14, 1958.

== Synopsis ==
A member of the German nobility, zur Linde is born in Marienburg, West Prussia in 1908. Raised Lutheran, zur Linde loses his faith in Christianity after reading the writings of Schopenhauer, Nietzsche and Oswald Spengler. Soon after, he joins the Schutzstaffel. Despite his deep contempt for his fellow SS men, zur Linde persuades himself that the Nazi Party needs men like himself to assure the world a glorious future.

On March 1, 1939, he is wounded in the leg while attacking a synagogue in Tilsit. Days later, when the Wehrmacht invades Czechoslovakia, zur Linde is recuperating in a hospital following the amputation of his leg. Declaring how Raskolnikov's switch to robbery and murder was more difficult than the conquests of Napoleon Bonaparte, zur Linde relates how, on February 7, 1941, he was appointed subdirector of Tarnowitz concentration camp. There, many Jewish intellectuals are tortured and murdered under his orders.

He relates, "Carrying out the duties attendant on that position was not something I enjoyed, but I never sinned by omission. The coward proves himself among swords, the compassionate man, seeks to be tested by jails and other's pain."

During the fall of 1942, Otto's brother Friedrich is killed in action in the Second Battle of El Alamein. Soon after, an Allied bombing raid destroys zur Linde's house in Marienburg.

Soon after the end of the Second World War, zur Linde is captured and placed on trial for crimes against humanity. Refusing to offer a defense for his actions, zur Linde is convicted and sentenced to death by firing squad. As he awaits his end, zur Linde scribbles a last testament in his prison cell. He offers no justification and rejoices in the fact that "violence and faith in the sword" shall govern the future rather than "servile Christian acts of timidity." He further expresses hope that, if victory and glory do not belong to Nazi Germany, they may belong to other nations: "Let heaven exist, though our place be in hell."

As he ponders how he shall comport himself before the firing squad, zur Linde realizes that he feels no fear or pity, even for himself.

== Conception ==
Zur Linde's reflections articulate a typical trait of fascism, the notion of sacrificial violence and rejection of the sentiment of empathy for his victim, his dehumanization and blaming. This passage refers to Nietzsche's Thus Spoke Zarathustra (1885), in which the disposition of sharing in the suffering of the victim is seen as a vulnerability.

In an interview with Richard Burgin, Borges recalled how his interactions with Argentina's Nazi sympathisers led him to write the short story.

And then I realized that those people that were on the side of Germany, that they never thought of German victories or the German glory. What they really liked was the idea of the Blitzkrieg, of London being on fire, of the country being destroyed. As to the German fighters, they took no stock in them. Then I thought, well now Germany has lost, now America has saved us from this nightmare, but since nobody can doubt on which side I stood, I'll see what can be done from a literary point of view in favor of the Nazis. And then I created the ideal Nazi. Of course, no Nazi was ever like that, they were all full of self pity; when they were on trial no one thought of saying, "Yes, I'm guilty, I ought to be shot; why not, this is as it should be and I would shoot you if I could." Nobody said that. They were all apologising and crying...
