= Norman Thomas di Giovanni =

American editor and translator

- Born: October 3, 1933; Newton, Massachusetts, United States
- Died: February 16, 2017 (aged 83); Bournemouth, England
- Education: Antioch College
- Occupations: editor and translator
- Known for: collaboration with Argentine author Jorge Luis Borges
- Notable work: novel Novecento
- Parents: Leo di Giovanni (father); Pierina (nee Fontecchio) (mother)

Norman Thomas di Giovanni (October 3, 1933 – February 16, 2017) was an American-born editor and translator known for his collaboration with Argentine author Jorge Luis Borges.

== Biography ==
Di Giovanni was born in Newton, Massachusetts, in 1933, son of Leo di Giovanni, a landscaper, and Pierina (nee Fontecchio), who worked in a factory, and was named after Norman Thomas, leader of the Socialist Party of America. He studied Romance languages at Antioch College, from where he graduated in 1955. Over the next ten years, he collaborated with the Spanish poet Jorge Guillén, then on the faculty of Wellesley College, as editor of a collection of translations into English of fifty of Guillén's poems by eleven translator-poets including di Giovanni himself. The collection was published in 1965 as Cántico: a Selection.

Di Giovanni first met Borges in 1967 while the latter was the Charles Eliot Norton Professor of Poetry at Harvard University. Di Giovanni proposed that they collaborate in publishing an edition of Borges's poems in a manner similar to the Cántico selection. Twelve translator-poets were involved, including John Updike who worked from a literal translation by di Giovanni. First published on several occasions in The New Yorker, the translations appeared in book form in 1972 as Selected Poems, 1923–1967 with the Spanish and English versions on facing pages.

After Borges returned to Buenos Aires he invited di Giovanni to join him there and begin working with him on English versions of ten of his books. The first product of this collaboration, The Book of Imaginary Beings, was published by E.P. Dutton and Company in 1969. An account of their collaboration appears in Di Giovanni's 2003 book, The Lesson of the Master.

In an interview at the Massachusetts Institute of Technology in April 1980, Borges stated that Norman Thomas di Giovanni claimed his translations were better than Borges's originals, an opinion Borges himself also shared.

After Borges's death, his widow Maria Kodama renegotiated the English translation rights for his works. In particular, she terminated a longstanding agreement between Borges and di Giovanni under which royalties for a number of translations on which they collaborated were divided equally between author and translator. New translations by Andrew Hurley were commissioned and published to replace the Di Giovanni translations, which were allowed to go out of print.

Di Giovanni also wrote the novel Novecento, published in the US and UK as 1900, based on the similarly titled film by Bernardo Bertolucci. He lived in England for many years, and became a British citizen in 1992. He died at Bournemouth in 2017, at age 83. He was survived by his ex-wife Dr. Heather Booth di Giovanni (whom he married in 1969 in Buenos Aires, with Borges and his then wife Elsa as witnesses), their two children, Tom and Derek, and his long-time partner Susan Ashe.

== Works ==
=== Translations of Borges ===
- The Book of Imaginary Beings (1969)
- The Aleph and Other Stories 1933–1969 (Cape, 1971. ISBN 978-0224005845)
- Doctor Brodie’s Report (1972)
- Selected Poems 1923–1967 (1972)
- A Universal History of Infamy (E. P. Dutton, 1972)
- Borges on Writing (1973)
- In Praise of Darkness (1974)
- The Congress (1974)
- The Book of Sand (E. P. Dutton, 1977)
- Chronicles of Bustos Domecq (Written with Adolfo Bioy-Casares) (Dutton, 1979. 0-525-47548-6)
- Six Problems for don Isidro Parodi (1981)
- Evaristo Carriego (1984)
- El Etnografo [The Ethnographer] (1969)
