= Book of Imaginary Beings =

Work by Jorge Luis Borges

- First edition
- Author: Jorge Luis Borges with Margarita Guerrero
- Original title: Manual de zoología fantástica (later retitled El libro de los seres imaginarios)
- Translator: Norman Thomas di Giovanni (1969) and others
- Language: Spanish
- Genre: Bestiary
- Publisher: Fondo de Cultura Económica (1957); Dutton (1969)
- Publication date: 1957, 1967
- Publication place: Mexico, Argentina
- English publication date: June 1969
- Pages: 159 (1967); 256 (English)
- ISBN: 0-525-06990-9
- OCLC: 45958
- Dewey Decimal: 398.4/69
- LC Class: GR825.B6; GR825.B613

The Book of Imaginary Beings was written by Jorge Luis Borges with Margarita Guerrero and published in 1957 under the original Spanish title Manual de zoología fantástica ("Handbook of fantastic zoology"). It contains descriptions of mythical beasts from folklore and literature. In 1967 the authors published an expanded edition retitled as El libro de los seres imaginarios. Borges collaborated on the first English translation, which was praised upon its publication in 1969.

== Contents ==
Although a work of fiction, the book is situated in a tradition of paper museums, bestiaries, and natural history writing. In the preface, Borges states that the book is to be read "as with all miscellanies... not... straight through... Rather we would like the reader to dip into the pages at random, just as one plays with the shifting patterns of a kaleidoscope"; and that "legends of men taking the shapes of animals" have been omitted.

Though Borges conducted research for the book, he also fabricated sources and invented details (and in the case of the peryton, a whole creature). As translator Andrew Hurley writes, "The nature of Borges’ erudition, creativity, and sense of fun is such that it has been simply impossible to ferret out all the originals, where originals in fact ever existed (some of his “quotations” are almost certainly apocrypha, put-ons)."

== Versions ==
The original 1957 publication of Manual de zoología fantástica contained eighty-two entries. Thirty-four additional entries were added to the retitled second edition. While collaborating on the 1969 English translation, Borges revised many of the original entries and added another four, bringing the total count to 120.

In 2005, Penguin published an illustrated edition with a new English translation of the 116 entry 1967 edition as part of its series of Classics Deluxe editions.

=== Original editions ===
- Manual de zoología fantástica. Mexico D.F.: Fondo de Cultura Económica, 1957
- El libro de los seres imaginarios. Buenos Aires: Editorial Kier, S.A., 1967

=== English translations ===
- The Book of Imaginary Beings. Norman Thomas di Giovanni (tr.). E.P. Dutton, 1969.
- The Book of Imaginary Beings. Andrew Hurley (tr.), Peter Sís (illus.). Viking Penguin, 2005.

== Reception ==
A review from Publishers Weekly praised the book, describing it as "perfect foils for classic Borgesian musings on everything from biblical etymology to the underworld, giving the creatures particularly vivid and perfectly scaled shape". Reviewing the book for The Guardian, Caspar Henderson stated that the book was brief but also a "map of the endless labyrinth of human imagination and its contents" that was "dense and deep". The reviewer also commented that the entries on legends were "delightful". Benjamin DeMott in The New York Times also complimented the book, stating that it was "an amusing tribute to the human gift for seeing the invisible and debating whether it whistles". An article in Journal of Modern Literature, written by Melanie Nicholson, reported that some critics described the book as a "curious but unoriginal compilation of already-told tale". However, Nicholson stated that it was also "one worthy of serious consideration".

== Influence ==
Many writers have been influenced by The Book of Imaginary Beings; this is especially apparent in the way that many of Borges's fabrications are repeated as accurate representations of folklore in later bestiaries and books on fantastical creatures.

British weird fiction author China Miéville credits Borges for inspiring The Tain, his 2002 fantasy novella, which features "imagos" that resemble the Fauna of Mirrors entry in The Book of Imaginary Beings.

The title of Caspar Henderson's 2012 book The Book of Barely Imagined Beings is a reference to Borges's book. Cuban composer and classical guitarist Leo Brouwer also titled a 2018 album El Libro de los Seres Imaginarios after Borges's book.

== See also ==
- Anthrozoology
- Celestial Emporium of Benevolent Knowledge
- Meinong's jungle
- Peryton
