= The Zahir =

- Short story by Jorge Luis Borges
- Original title: El Zahir
- Country: Argentina
- Language: Spanish
- Genres: Fantasy, short story

Publication
- Media type: Print
- Publication date: 1949

"The Zahir" (original Spanish title: "El Zahir") is a short story by the Argentine writer and poet Jorge Luis Borges. It is one of the stories in the book The Aleph and Other Stories, first published in 1949, and revised by the author in 1974. Translated into English by Dudley Fitts, it was published in Partisan Review, February 1950.

== Plot summary ==
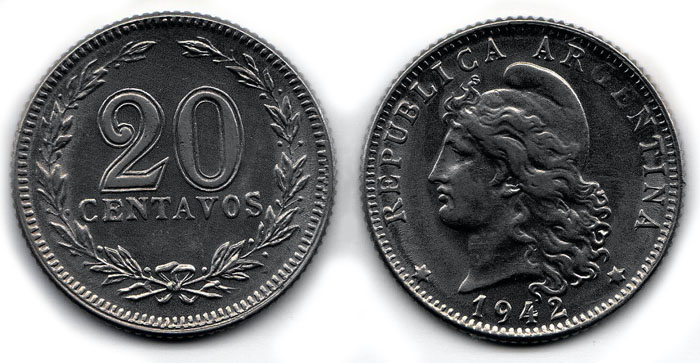
A 20 centavos coin, the narrator's Zahir

The Zahir is a person or an object that has the power to create an obsession in everyone who sees it, so that the affected person perceives less and less of reality and more and more of the Zahir, at first only while asleep, then at all times. Zahir (Arabic: ظاهر) is an Arabic term for that which is external and manifest.

In the story, a fictionalized version of Borges gets the Zahir in his change after paying for a drink in the form of a 20 cents coin. Borges then tells the reader about a train of thought focused on famous coins throughout history and legend, and the fact that a coin symbolizes our free will, since it can be turned into anything. These feverish thoughts keep him awake for a while. The next day, Borges decides to lose the coin. He goes to a faraway neighbourhood in Buenos Aires, while he carefully avoids looking at the street names and numbers, and manages to get rid of the Zahir by paying for another drink in an anonymous bar.

The writer is unable to forget the coin, which he gradually becomes more obsessed with. He tries to look for a cure, and after some research, he finds a book that explains the history behind the Zahir, and that it manifested previously as a tiger, an astrolabe, the bottom of a well, and a vein in a marble column in an aljama (a certain synagogue or mosque in Córdoba, Spain). According to the myth, everything on earth has the propensity to be a Zahir, but "the Almighty does not allow more than one thing at a time to be it, since one alone can seduce multitudes."

Borges tells us that soon he will be unable to perceive external reality, and he will have to be dressed and fed; but then he reflects that this fate does not worry him, since he will be oblivious to it. In idealistic philosophy, "to live and to dream are synonymous," and he will simply pass "from a very complex dream to a very simple dream." In a mixture of despair and resignation, he wonders:

Others will dream that I am mad, and I [will dream] of the Zahir. When all men on earth think day and night of the Zahir, which one will be a dream and which a reality, the earth or the Zahir?

== Related works ==
The title of The Zahir (2005) by Brazilian writer Paulo Coelho refers to Borges' story. It tells the story of a man who becomes obsessed with his wife, who has disappeared.

The Zahir has also been compared to David Foster Wallace's 1996 novel Infinite Jest by literary theorist Hernán Díaz. Díaz draws a parallel between Borges' Zahir – an object that monopolises the thoughts of whoever encounters it – and Infinite Jest's "the Entertainment", a film so compelling that viewers lose all interest in anything other than watching it. In both works, the object ultimately overwhelms its observer's capacity to direct their attention elsewhere, leading them to lose control over bodily functions and free will. Wallace briefly referenced the story in a New York Times review of a Borges biography.

== Notes ==
- "The Zahir" is in many ways the opposite of "The Aleph", the subject of another Borges short story also published in the same short story collection. Whereas viewing the Aleph causes the observer to see all things, viewing the Zahir causes the observer eventually to see nothing but it.
- This is one of many Borges stories that manifests the author's obsession with tigers. (The story mentions a man afflicted by the Zahir who sees only tigers.)
- Borges touches upon the concept of the Zahir in his short story "Deutsches Requiem", also published in 1949. In that story, Borges wrote: "I had come to understand many years before that there is nothing on earth that does not contain the seed of a possible Hell; a face, a word, a compass, a cigarette advertisement, are capable of driving a person mad if he is unable to forget them." Both stories also contain similar passages about a piece of art containing tigers.
