= Labyrinths (short story collection) =

1962 book by Jorge Luis Borges

- Cover of the first edition
- Author: Jorge Luis Borges
- Translators: James E. Irby, Donald A. Yates, John M. Fein, Harriet de Onís, Julian Palley, Dudley Fitts, L.A. Murillo
- Language: English
- Genre: Magical realism, fantasy, metafiction, surrealism
- Publisher: New Directions
- Publication place: United States
- English publication date: 1962
- Media type: Print (paperback)
- ISBN: 978-0-8112-0012-7

Labyrinths (1962, 1964, 1970, 1983) is a collection of short stories and essays by Argentine writer and poet Jorge Luis Borges. It was translated into English, published soon after Borges won the International Publishers' Prize with Samuel Beckett.

It includes, among other stories, "Tlön, Uqbar, Orbis Tertius", "The Garden of Forking Paths", and "The Library of Babel", three of Borges's most famous stories. The edition, published only in English, was edited by James E. Irby and Donald A. Yates, with a preface by André Maurois of the Académie française and an introduction by Irby.

== Contents ==
Besides the different stories and essays by Borges mentioned below, the book also contains a preface and introduction, an elegy for Borges, a chronology of Borges's life, and a bibliography.

=== Stories ===
1. "Tlön, Uqbar, Orbis Tertius"
2. "The Garden of Forking Paths"
3. "The Lottery in Babylon"
4. "Pierre Menard, Author of the Quixote"
5. "The Circular Ruins"
6. "The Library of Babel"
7. "Funes the Memorious"
8. "The Shape of the Sword"
9. "Theme of the Traitor and the Hero"
10. "Death and the Compass"
11. "The Secret Miracle"
12. "Three Versions of Judas"
13. "The Sect of the Phoenix"
14. "The Immortal"
15. "The Theologians"
16. "Story of the Warrior and the Captive"
17. "Emma Zunz"
18. "The House of Asterion"
19. "Deutsches Requiem"
20. "Averroes' Search"
21. "The Zahir"
22. "The Waiting"
23. "The Writing Of God"

Stories 1–13 are from Ficciones; 14–23 are from The Aleph.

=== Essays ===
- "The Argentine Writer and Tradition"
- "The Wall and the Books"
- "The Fearful Sphere of Pascal"
- "Partial Magic in the Quixote"
- "Valéry as Symbol"
- "Kafka and His Precursors"
- "Avatars of the Tortoise"
- "The Mirror of Enigmas"
- "A Note on (toward) Bernard Shaw"
- "A New Refutation of Time"

All essays are from Otras inquisiciones (1952), except "The Argentine Writer and Tradition" and "Avatars of the Tortoise" which are from Discusión (1932).

=== Parables ===
- "Inferno, I, 32"
- "Paradiso, XXXI, 108"
- "Ragnarök"
- "Parable of Cervantes and the Quixote"
- "The Witness"
- "A Problem"
- "Borges and I"
- "Everything and Nothing"

All parables are from The Maker.

== Analysis ==
André Maurois in the Preface of Labyrinths provides a critical overview of Borges's work. He makes three main points: first, that Borges was highly influenced by his wide and obscure reading, making the assertion that, "His sources are innumerable and unexpected. Borges has read everything, and especially what nobody reads any more: the Cabalists, the Alexandrine Greeks, medieval philosophers. His erudition is not profound ― he asks of it only flashes of lightning and ideas ― but it is vast." Second, that Borges has many precursors, but is in the end, almost entirely unique - "... once these relationships are pointed out, it must be said that Borges's style is, like his thought, highly original". In this Maurois notes that to some extent, "'Every writer creates his own precursors'", finally noting that Borges's stories can be described by "'an absurd postulate developed to its extreme logical consequences'", making "a game for [Borges'] mind". This, he claims, reflects Borges' interest in metaphysics and philosophy, and leads to his style of magical realism.

== Translators ==
Labyrinths' principal editor and translator is James Irby, Professor Emeritus at Princeton. Irby's work on Labyrinths includes the book's Introduction and translations of the stories "Tlön, Uqbar, Orbis Tertius", "Pierre Menard, Author of the Quixote", "The Circular Ruins", "The Library of Babel", "Funes the Memorious", "Theme of the Traitor and the Hero", "Three Versions of Judas", "The Sect of the Phoenix", "The Immortal," "The Theologians", "Story of the Warrior and the Captive", "The House of Asterion", "Averroes' Search", and "The Waiting": fourteen titles in all, and the largest part of the translation work for the book.

The balance of the translations are by Donald A. Yates, Professor Emeritus of Spanish American literature at Michigan State University; John M. Fein, Professor Emeritus, Spanish, in the Department of Romance Languages at Duke University; Julian Palley (September 16, 1925 - December 20, 2014) of the University of California, Irvine; and author and prize-winning translator Harriet de Onís.

== Publication information ==
Originally published by New Directions Publishing,

- Original paperback: ISBN 978-0-8112-0012-7
- Re-issue: ISBN 978-0-8112-1699-9, with introduction by William Gibson

There is also a Modern Library hardcover edition, ISBN 978-0-394-60449-7.

== Reception ==
On the book's release, the journalist Mildred Adams at The New York Times wrote of it, "The translations, made by various hands, are not only good they are downright enjoyable. They make it finally possible, after all these years, to give Borges his due and to add North Americans to his wide public." In 2012, the novelist Jake Arnott observed in The Independent:

Like many of my generation, I first encountered him in the Penguin edition of Labyrinths, a collection of stories, essays, parables and poetry. An excellent compendium, it's a sort of collection of collections which I find a little frustrating (although it mirrors his theme of recursiveness). More recently, there has been the reissue of all of his short stories: Collected Fictions, translated by Andrew Hurley. But this new translation, commissioned by his estate after his death, has proved controversial. The battle over Borges's legacy in English has become as Daedalian as one of his faux literary essays. It's hard to know where to begin rereading.

The essayist Alberto Manguel writes in The Guardian:

since the first American translations of Borges, attempted in the Fifties by well-intentioned admirers such as Donald Yates and James Irby, English-speaking readers have been very poorly served. From the uneven versions collected in Labyrinths to the more meticulous, but ultimately unsuccessful, editions published by Norman Thomas di Giovanni, from Ruth Simm's abominable apery of Other Inquisitions to Paul Bowles's illiterate rendition of The Circular Ruins, Borges in English must be read in spite of the translations.

In 2008 the London Society of Authors selected Labyrinths as one of the fifty outstanding translations from the last fifty years.

== See also ==
- Bibliography of Jorge Luis Borges
