= Tlön, Uqbar, Orbis Tertius =

1940 short story by Jorge Luis Borges

- Short story by Jorge Luis Borges
- Country: Argentina
- Language: Spanish
- Genres: Speculative fiction short story, philosophical fiction

Publication
- Publisher: Sur
- Publication date: May 1940
- Published in English: 1961

"Tlön, Uqbar, Orbis Tertius" is a short story by the 20th-century Argentine writer Jorge Luis Borges. The story was first published in the Argentine journal Sur, May 1940. The "postscript" dated 1947 is intended to be anachronistic, set seven years in the future. The first English-language translation of the story, by James E. Irby, was published in 1961 in New World Writing N° 18. In 1962 it was included in the short story collection Labyrinths (New Directions), the first collection of Borges' works published in English.

Told in a first-person narrative, the story focuses on the author's discovery of the mysterious and possibly fictional country of Uqbar and its legend of Tlön, a mythical world whose inhabitants believe a form of subjective idealism, denying the reality of objects and nouns, as well as Orbis Tertius, the secret organization that created both fictional locations. Relatively long for Borges (approximately 5,600 words), the story is a work of speculative fiction.

The story alludes to many leading intellectual figures both in Argentina and in the world at large, and takes up a number of themes more typical of a novel of ideas. Most of the ideas engaged are in the areas of metaphysics, language, epistemology, and literary criticism.

== Summary ==
The reportage unfolds as a first-person narrative and contains many references (see below) to real people, locations, literary works and philosophical concepts, besides some fictional or ambiguous ones. It is divided into two parts and a postscript. Events and facts are revealed roughly in the order that the narrator becomes aware of them or their relevance. The timing of events in Borges's story is approximately from 1935 to 1947; the plot concerns events going back as far as the early 17th century and culminating in the postscript, set in 1947.

=== Part one ===
Borges and his friend and collaborator, Adolfo Bioy Casares, are developing their next book in a country house near Buenos Aires, in 1940. In an observation, Bioy quotes that "mirrors and copulation are abominable, because they increase the number of men", a saying by a heresiarch of a land named Uqbar. Borges, impressed with the "memorable" sentence, asks for its source. Bioy replies that he read it in the chapter about Uqbar of the Anglo-American Cyclopaedia, "a literal if inadequate reprint" of the 1902 edition of Encyclopædia Britannica. They check the book and are unable to find the said chapter, to Bioy's surprise. The two then search for the name 'Uqbar' in numerous atlases and other encyclopedias, trying different alternative spellings, to no avail.

The following day, Bioy tells Borges he has found the chapter they were looking for in a different reprint of the same encyclopedia. The chapter, although brief and full of names unfamiliar to Borges and Bioy, entices their curiosity. It describes Uqbar as an obscure region, located in Iraq or Asia Minor, with an all-fantastic literature taking place in the mythical worlds of Mlejnas and Tlön. Afterwards, they keep searching for Uqbar in other sources, but are unable to find any mention.

=== Part two ===
The engineer Herbert Ashe, an English friend of Borges' father with a peculiar interest in duodecimal systems, dies of an aneurysm rupture. Borges inherits a packet containing a book, which was left by Ashe in a pub. That book is revealed to be the eleventh volume of an English-language encyclopedia entirely devoted to Tlön, one of the worlds in which Uqbar's legends are set. The book contains two oval blue stamps with the words Orbis Tertius inscribed in blue. From that point, as Borges reads the tome, part two comprehensively describes and discusses Tlön's culture, history, languages and philosophy.

The people of the imaginary Tlön hold an extreme form of Berkeley's subjective idealism, denying the reality of the material world. Their world is understood "not as a concurrence of objects in space, but as a heterogeneous series of independent acts." One of the imagined language families of Tlön lacks nouns, being centered instead in impersonal verbs qualified by monosyllabic adverbial affixes. Borges lists a Tlönic equivalent of "The moon rose above the water": hlör u fang axaxaxas mlö, meaning literally "upward, behind the onstreaming it mooned." (Andrew Hurley, one of Borges' translators, wrote a fiction in which he says that the words "axaxaxas mlö" "can only be pronounced as the author's cruel, mocking laughter".) In another language family of Tlön, "the basic unit is not the verb, but the monosyllabic adjective", which in combinations of two or more forms nouns: "moon" becomes "round airy-light on dark" or "pale-orange-of-the-sky".

A dissident scholar of Tlön, going against the established philosophy and languages, tried to propound the theory of materialism, suggesting that a number of coins still existed after a man lost them and they could not be seen by anyone, "albeit in some secret way that we are forbidden to understand". The proposition was scandalous and widely rejected by Tlön's academia, who considered it a sophism and a fallacy. A century later, another thinker formulated a pantheistic conjecture that "there is but a single subject; that indivisible subject is every being in the universe, and the beings of the universe are the organs and masks of the deity"; this ended up triumphing over all other schools of thought. One of the effects is the rejection of authorship, with books seldom being signed and the concept of plagiarism being alien because "all books are the work of a single author who is timeless and anonymous".

Another influence of that idealism is that, for about a hundred years, a class of duplicating, apparently atemporal objects called hrönir (singular hrön) have been produced in Tlön. Objects also "grow vague or sketchy and lose detail" when they begin to be forgotten, culminating in their disappearance when they are completely forgotten.

=== Postscript ===
In the anachronistic postscript set in 1947, Borges remembers events that occurred in the last years.

In 1941, the world and the narrator have learned, through the emergence of a letter, about the true nature of Tlön. It goes that a "benevolent secret society" was formed "one night in Lucerne or in London", in the 17th century, and had Berkeley among its members. That group, a society of intellectuals named Orbis Tertius, studied "hermetic studies, philanthropy and the Kabbalah" (an allusion to societies such as the Bavarian Illuminati, the Freemasons and the Rosicrucians), but its main purpose was to create a country: Uqbar. It gradually became clear that such work would have to be carried by numerous generations, so each master agreed to elect a disciple who would carry on his work to perpetuate a hereditary arrangement. The society is eventually persecuted, but reemerges in the United States two centuries thereafter. The American "eccentric" millionaire Ezra Buckley, one of the members of the restored sect, finds its undertaking too modest, proposing that their creation be of an entire world instead of just a country. He also adds that an entire encyclopedia about this world—named Tlön—must be written and that the whole scheme "have no pact with that impostor Jesus Christ." The new Orbis Tertius, composed of three hundred collaborators, proceeds to conclude the final volume of the First Encyclopedia of Tlön. An explanation of Uqbar is not explicitly given in the story.

By 1942, Tlönian objects began to inexplicably appear in the real world. One of the first instances in which this occurs is when Princess Faucigny Lucinge received, via mail, a vibrating compass with a Tlönian scripture. Another instance is witnessed by Borges himself: a drunk man, shortly after dying, dropped coins among which a small but extremely heavy shining metal cone appeared. It is suggested that these occurrences may have been forgeries, but yet products of a secret science and technology.

By 1944, all forty volumes of the First Encyclopedia of Tlön have been discovered and published in a library in Memphis, Tennessee. The material becomes accessible worldwide and immensely influential on Earth's culture, science and languages. By the time Borges concludes the story, presumably in 1947, the world is gradually becoming Tlön. Borges then turns to an obsession of his own: a translation of Sir Thomas Browne's Urn Burial into Spanish.

== Major themes ==
=== Philosophical themes ===
Through the vehicle of fantasy or speculative fiction, this story playfully explores several philosophical questions and themes. These include, above all, an effort by Borges to imagine a world (Tlön) where the 18th century philosophical subjective idealism of George Berkeley is viewed as common sense and "the doctrine of materialism" is considered a heresy, a scandal, and a paradox. Through describing the languages of Tlön, the story also plays with the Sapir–Whorf hypothesis (also called "linguistic relativism")—the epistemological question of how language influences what thoughts are possible. The story also contains several metaphors for the way ideas influence reality. This last theme is first explored cleverly, by way of describing physical objects being willed into existence by the force of imagination, but later turns darker, as fascination with the idea of Tlön begins to distract people from paying adequate attention to the reality of Earth.

Much of the story engages with the philosophical idealism of George Berkeley, who questioned whether it is possible to say that a thing exists if it is not being perceived. (Berkeley, a philosopher and, later, a bishop in the Protestant Church of Ireland, resolved that question to his own satisfaction by saying that the omnipresent perception of God ensures that objects continue to exist outside of personal or human perception.) Berkeley's philosophy privileges perceptions over any notion of the "thing in itself." Immanuel Kant accused Berkeley of going so far as to deny objective reality.

In the imagined world of Tlön, an exaggerated Berkeleyan idealism without God passes for common sense. The Tlönian recognizes perceptions as primary and denies the existence of any underlying reality. At the end of the main portion of the story, immediately before the postscript, Borges stretches this toward its logical breaking point by imagining that, "Occasionally a few birds, a horse perhaps, have saved the ruins of an amphitheater" by continuing to perceive it. Besides commenting on Berkeley's philosophy, this and other aspects of Borges's story can be taken as a commentary on the ability of ideas to influence reality. For example, in Tlön there are objects known as hrönir that arise when two different people find the "same" lost object in different places.

Borges imagines a Tlönite working his way out of the problem of solipsism by reasoning that if all people are actually aspects of one being, then perhaps the universe is consistent because that one being is consistent in his imagining. This is, effectively, a near-reconstruction of the Berkeleyan God: perhaps not omnipresent, but bringing together all perceptions that do, indeed, occur.

This story is not the only place where Borges engages with Berkeleyan idealism. In the world of Tlön, as in Borges's essay New refutation of time (1947), there is (as Emir Rodríguez Monegal and Alastair Reid comment) a "denial of space, time, and the individual I." This worldview does not merely "bracket off" objective reality, but also parcels it separately into all its successive moments. Even the continuity of the individual self is open to question.

When Borges writes "The metaphysicians of Tlön are not looking for truth or even an approximation to it: they are after a kind of amazement. They consider metaphysics a branch of fantastic literature," he can be seen either as anticipating the extreme relativism that underlies some postmodernism or simply as taking a swipe at those who take metaphysics too seriously.

=== Literary themes ===
In the context of the imagined world of Tlön, Borges describes a school of literary criticism that arbitrarily assumes that two works are by the same person and, based on that, deduces things about the imagined author. This is similar to the ending of "Pierre Menard, Author of the Quixote", in which Borges's narrator suggests that a new perspective can be opened by treating a book as though it were written by a different author.

The story also plays with the theme of the love of books in general, and of encyclopedias and atlases in particular—books that are each themselves, in some sense, a world.

Like many of Borges's works, the story challenges the boundaries between fiction and non-fiction. It mentions several quite real historical human beings (himself, his friend Bioy Casares, Thomas de Quincey, et al.) but often attributes fictional aspects to them; the story also contains many fictional characters and others whose factuality may be open to question.

=== Other themes ===
"Tlön, Uqbar, Orbis Tertius" also engages a number of other related themes. The story begins and ends with issues of reflection, replication, and reproduction—both perfect and imperfect—and the related issue of the power of language and ideas to make or remake the world.

At the start of the story, we have an "unnerving" and "grotesque" mirror reflecting the room, a "literal if inadequate" (and presumably plagiarized) reproduction of the Encyclopædia Britannica, an apt misquotation by Bioy Casares, and the issue of whether one should be able to trust whether the various copies of a single book will have the same content. At the end Borges is working on a "tentative translation" of an English-language work into Spanish, while the power of the ideas of "a scattered dynasty of solitaries" remakes the world in the image of Tlön.

Along the way we have stone mirrors; the idea of reconstructing an entire encyclopedia of an imaginary world based on a single volume; the analogy of that encyclopedia to a "cosmos" governed by "strict laws"; a worldview in which our normal notions of "thing" are rejected, but "ideal objects abound, invoked and dissolved momentarily, according to poetic necessity"; the universe conceived as "the handwriting of a minor god to communicate with a demon" or a "code system... in which not all symbols have meaning"; hrönir, duplicates of objects called into existence by ignorance or hope, and where "those of the eleventh degree have a purity of form that the originals do not possess"; and Ezra Buckley's wish "to demonstrate to a nonexistent God that mortal men were capable of conceiving a world."

Borges also mentions in passing the duodecimal system (as well as others). This ties into his description of Tlön's arithmetic, which emphasizes indefinite numbers, and holds that a number does not actually have any value or independent existence until it is counted/named. However, some may see the reference to the duodecimal system as inherently refuting of the changeability of things due to nomenclature—a number may be renamed under a different counting schema, but the underlying value will always remain the same.

== Fact and fiction ==
It is challenging to sort out fact and fiction within this story. The picture is further complicated by the fact that other authors (both in print and on the web) have chosen to join Borges in his game and write about one or another fictional aspect of this story either as if it were non-fiction or in a manner that could potentially confuse the unwary reader. One online example is the Italian-language website La Biblioteca di Uqbar, which treats Tlön itself as duly fictional, but writes as if the fictional Silas Haslam's entirely imaginary History of the Land Called Uqbar were a real work.

As a result, simply finding a reference to a person or place from "Tlön, Uqbar, Orbis Tertius" in a context seemingly unrelated to Borges's story is not enough to be confident that the person or place is real. See, for example, the discussion below of the character Silas Haslam.

There in fact exists an Anglo-American Encyclopedia, which is a plagiarism, differently paginated, of the tenth edition of the Encyclopedia, and in which the 46th volume is TOT-UPS, ending on p. 917 with Upsala, and followed by Ural–Altaic in the next volume; Uqbar would fall in between. In the 11th edition of the Britannica, Borges's favorite, there is an article in between these on "Ur"; which may, in some sense, therefore be Uqbar. Different articles in the 11th edition mention that Ur, as the name of a city, means simply "the city", and that Ur is also the aurochs, or the evil god of the Mandaeans. Borges may be punning on the sense of "primaeval" here with his repeated use of Ursprache, or on the story's own definition of "ur" in one of Tlön's languages as "a thing produced by suggestion, an object elicited by hope".

=== Levels of reality ===
There are several levels of reality (or unreality) in the story:

- Most (but not all) of the people mentioned in the story are real, but the events in which they are involved are mostly fictional, as are some of the works attributed to them. This is discussed in detail in the section below on real and fictional people.
- The main portion of the story is a fiction set in a naturalistic world; in the postscript, magical elements have entered the narrator's world. The main portion could certainly be seen as a false document; the postscript may dissolve the illusion.
- Mlejnas, and Tlön as it is first introduced, are fictional from the point of view of Uqbar. In the course of the story, Tlön becomes more and more "real": first it moves from being a fiction of Uqbar to being a fiction of the narrator's own naturalistic world, then it begins (first as idea and then physically) taking over that world, to the point of finally threatening to annihilate normal reality.

=== Real and fictional places ===
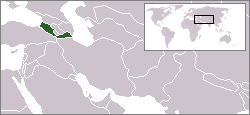
Possible location of Uqbar

Uqbar in the story is doubly fictional: even within the world of the story it turns out to be a fictional place. The fictitious entry described in the story furnishes deliberately meager indications of Uqbar's location: "Of the fourteen names which figured in the geographical part, we only recognized three – Khorasan, Armenia, Erzerum – interpolated in the text in an ambiguous way." Armenia and Erzerum lie in the eastern highlands of Asia Minor (in and near modern Turkey, perhaps corresponding to Urartu), while Khorasan is in northeastern Iran, though there is also a Horasan in eastern Turkey. However, it was said to have cited an equally nonexistent German-titled book – Lesbare und lesenswerthe Bemerkungen über das Land Ukkbar in Klein-Asien ("Legible and valuable observations about the land of Uqbar in Asia Minor") – whose title claims unambiguously that Uqbar was in Asia Minor.

The boundaries of Uqbar were described using equally nonexistent reference points; for instance, "the lowlands of Tsai Khaldun and the Axa Delta marked the southern frontier". This would suggest that the rivers of Borges' Uqbar should rise in highlands to the north; in fact, the mountainous highlands of eastern Turkey are where not one but two Zab Rivers rise, the Great Zab and the Lesser Zab. They run a couple of hundred miles south into the Tigris.

The only points of Uqbar's history mentioned relate to religion, literature, and craft. It was described as the home of a noted heresiarch, and the scene of religious persecutions directed against the orthodox in the thirteenth century; fleeing the latter, its orthodox believers built obelisks in their southerly place of exile, and made mirrors – seen by the heresiarch as abominable – of stone. Crucially for the story, Uqbar's "epics and legends never referred to reality, but to the two imaginary regions of Mlejnas and Tlön."

Although the culture of Uqbar described by Borges is fictional, there are two real places with similar names. These are:

1. The medieval city of ‘Ukbarâ on the left bank of the Tigris between Samarra and Baghdad in what is now Iraq. This city was home to the great Islamic grammarian, philologist, and religious scholar Al-‘Ukbarî (c. 1143–1219) – who was blind, like Borges's father and like Borges himself was later to become – and to two notable early Jewish/Karaite "heresiarchs" (see above), leaders of Karaite movements opposed to Anan ben David, Ishmael al-Ukbari and Meshwi al-Ukbari, mentioned in the Jewish Encyclopedia of 1901–1906.
2. ‘Uqbâr in the Atlas Mountains of Algeria; the minarets of the latter's area might relate to the "obelisks" of Uqbar in the story.

Tsai Khaldun is undoubtedly a tribute to the great historian Ibn Khaldun, who lived in Andalusia for a while; his history focuses on North Africa and was probably a major source for Borges. Additionally, "tsai" most likely comes from Turkish "çay" which is an uncommon word for river.

=== Real and fictional people ===
Listed here in order of their appearance in the story:

- Jorge Luis Borges (1899–1986)—Author and first person narrator of the story.
- Adolfo Bioy Casares (1914–1999)—non-fictional, Argentinian fiction-writer, a friend and frequent collaborator of Borges.
- An unnamed "heresiarch of Uqbar" is credited for the statement that "mirrors and copulation are abominable because they increase the number of men". This echoes Borges' own summary of the teachings of Al-Muqanna (d. c. 783), a Persian prophet regarded by his orthodox Muslim contemporaries as a heresiarch. In the previously published short story collection A Universal History of Infamy, Borges wrote the following as part of a summary of his message: "The world we live in is a mistake, a clumsy parody. Mirrors and fatherhood, because they multiply and confirm the parody, are abominations."
- Justus Perthes (1749–1816)—non-fictional, 18th century founder of a German publishing firm that bears his name; undoubtedly, the story is accurate in implying the firm's atlases do not mention Uqbar.
- Carl Ritter (1779–1859)—one of the founders of modern geography. In the story, Borges notes the absence of any mention of Uqbar in Ritter's cartographic index Erdkunde. (In the story, only the surname is given.)
- Smerdis (d. 522 BC)—The story refers in passing to "the impostor, Smerdis the Magician". After the death of the actual Smerdis (son of Cyrus the Great of Persia) a Magian priest named Gaumata successfully impersonated him for several months and ruled in his stead.
- Bernard Quaritch (1819–1899)—An actual nineteenth-century bookseller in London. The bookstore bearing his name still survives. In the story, his catalogues include Silas Haslam's History of the Land Called Uqbar.
- Silas Haslam—Entirely fictional, but based on Borges' English ancestors. "Haslam" was Borges's paternal grandmother's maiden name. In the story, besides the 1874 History of the Land Called Uqbar, a footnote informs us that Haslam is also the author of A General History of Labyrinths (labyrinths as well as playfully fake literary references are a recurring theme in Borges's work). Silas Haslam is an entirely fictional character. However, Haslam's "General History of Labyrinths" has been cited twice in reputable, peer-reviewed scientific literature: in "Complexity of two-dimensional patterns", by Kristian Lindgren, Christopher Moore, and Mats Nordahl (published in the June 1998 edition of the Journal of Statistical Physics) and "Order parameter equations for front transitions: Nonuniformly curved fronts," by A. Hagberg and E. Meron (published in the November 15, 1998 issue of Physica D).
- Johannes Valentinus Andreä (1586–1654)—German theologian, and the real author of Chymische Hochzeit Christiani Rosencreutz anno 1459 (Chymical Wedding of Christian Rosenkreutz), one of the three founding works of the Rosicrucians, but not of the Lesbare und lesenswerthe Bemerkungen über das Land Ukkbar in Klein-Asien (Readable and worthwhile remarks about the country of Ukkbar in Asia Minor) attributed to him in this story.
- Thomas De Quincey (1785–1859)—best known for his autobiographical works Confessions of an English Opium-Eater and Lake Reminiscences. Mentioned in passing in the story (by his surname) for his ostensible (not independently verified) mention of Andreä.
- Carlos Mastronardi (1901–1976)—Argentinian writer, member of the Martín Fierro group (also known as Florida group), and a close friend of Borges. In the story, he finds a copy of the Anglo-American Cyclopaedia that omits the Uqbar pages.
- Herbert Ashe (d. 1937)—presumably fictional, based on one or more of Borges's father's English friends. He shares with Xul Solar (see below) an interest in the duodecimal numeral system (in which twelve is written as 10.)
- Néstor Ibarra, Ezequiel Martínez Estrada (1895–1964), and (Pierre) Drieu La Rochelle (1893–1945)—all historical, described in the story as engaged in a dispute over whether the discovery of A First Encyclopaedia of Tlön. Volume XI. Hlaer to Jangr implies the existence of the other volumes to which it makes references. Ibarra was a noted Argentinian poet (and Borges's translator into French); Estrada, an Argentinian, was the author of, among other works, Muerte y transfiguración de Martín Fierro ("Death and Transfiguration of Martín Fierro"), a major commentary on Argentina's most famous nineteenth century literary work. Drieu La Rochelle, who was to commit suicide after becoming infamous for his collaboration with the Nazis during the Occupation of France, was one of the few foreign contributors to Sur, Victoria Ocampo's Argentine journal to which Borges was a regular contributor.
- Alfonso Reyes (1889–1959)—Mexican diplomat who served for a time in Argentina and was a mentor figure for young Borges. In the story, he proposes to recreate the missing volumes of A First Encyclopaedia of Tlön.
- The philosopher Leibniz (1646–1716) is mentioned in passing, and Hume (1711–1776) is mentioned for finding Berkeley "unanswerable but thoroughly unconvincing."
- Bishop George Berkeley (1685–1753), a driving engine of the story, was the founder of the modern school of philosophical idealism.
- Xul Solar (1887–1963)—adopted name of Oscar Agustín Alejandro Schulz Solari, Argentinian watercolorist, esotericist, and (presumably most relevant here) inventor of imaginary languages. In the real world a close associate of Borges and a member of the Florida group; in the story, he skillfully translates one of the languages of the Southern Hemisphere of Tlön.
- Alexius Meinong (1853–1920)—Austrian psychologist and philosopher, who wrote Gegenstandstheorie ("The theory of objects"), where he wrote at length about the notion of objects that exist only in our minds. He is referred to by his surname in the story; his theories are alluded to by way of explaining the languages of the northern hemisphere of Tlön. Presumably, Borges is acknowledging where he got the idea for this imaginary family of languages.
- Bertrand Russell (1872–1970)—British philosopher. In a footnote, the story refers (accurately) to his conjecture that (in Borges's words) "our planet was created a few moments ago, and provided with a humanity which 'remembers' an illusory past."
- Baruch Spinoza (1632–1677)—Dutch / Portuguese Jewish philosopher, referred to in the story by his surname, and accurately paraphrased: "Spinoza attributes to his inexhaustible divinity the attributes of extension and of thought."
- Similarly, the story's use of the German-language phrase Philosophie des Als Ob refers to philosopher Hans Vaihinger (1852–1933), whose book of this name (first edition: 1911) puts forward the notion that some human concepts are simply useful fictions.
- The ancient Greek philosopher Zeno (490–430 BC) is accurately alluded to in the story for his paradoxes denying the possibility of motion, based on the indivisibility of time.
- The philosopher Arthur Schopenhauer (1788–1860), as with Meinong, is acknowledged, in this case for his Parerga und Paralipomena, which Borges (apparently falsely) claims parallels a Tlönist "idealist pantheism". This is really the absolute idealism of Schopenhauer's despised rival, Hegel (1770–1831), which was derived from Spinoza's pantheism. Schopenhauer does not assert that there is only one subject and that this one subject is every being in the universe; on the contrary, he asserts that each individual observing animal is a unique subject, having its own point of view of the objects that it experiences. Presumably Borges's related remark about preserving a psychological basis for the sciences is something of a joke on preserving a scientific basis for psychology.
- William Shakespeare (1564–1616)—English poet, playwright, and actor. Merely alluded to in the story, without fictional embellishment.
- Gunnar Erfjord is presumably not a real person. The name is a combination of Gunnar Lange and Berta Erfjord, parents of Argentinian author Norah Lange, another member of the Martín Fierro group. At the beginning of the postscript to the story, a letter from Gunnar Erfjord clears up the mystery of the "benevolent secret society" that devised Tlön. He is presumably also the "Norwegian in Rio Grande do Sul" mentioned early in the story.
- Charles Howard Hinton (1853–1907) was an eccentric British mathematician, associated with the theosophists; Borges later edited and wrote a prologue for a translation of Hinton's "scientific romances", and also alludes to him in the story "There are More Things", in the Book of Sand (1975). In "Tlön...", the letter from Gunnar Erfjord is found "in a volume of Hinton", presumably invoked for his interest in extra dimensions and parallel worlds.
- George Dalgarno (1626–1687), seventeenth-century Scottish intellectual with an interest in linguistics, and inventor of a language for deaf mutes. He is alluded to by his last name as an early member (along with Berkeley) of the fictional secret society that sets in motion the story of the doubly fictional Uqbar (and the triply fictional Tlön).
- Ezra Buckley (d. 1848), the eccentric American benefactor who expands the scale of the Uqbarist enterprise to a full Tlönist encyclopedic undertaking, is entirely fictional. It has been conjectured that there is an allusion to Ezra Pound. His nationality and greater aspiration can also be a reference to American ambition.
- María Lidia Lloveras (1898–?)—Argentinian, married into an old French noble family, making her Princess Faucigny Lucinge. She lived in Buenos Aires and was a friend of Borges. In the story, under her royal title, she stumbles across one of the first objects from Tlön to appear in our world.
- Enrique Amorim (1900–1960)—Uruguayan novelist. In the story, along with Borges, he witnesses the Tlönic coins that have fallen from the pocket of a dead man.
- Francisco de Quevedo (1580–1645)—Baroque Spanish poet and picaresque novelist, is alluded to here simply for his writing style.
- Thomas Browne (1605–1682), seventeenth-century English physician and essayist, is indeed the author of Urn Burial, which at the end of the story the fictional Borges is translating, though without intent to publish.

== Context in Borges's life and works ==
"Tlön, Uqbar, Orbis Tertius" formed part of a 1941 collection of stories called The Garden of Forking Paths.

At the time he wrote "Tlön, Uqbar, Orbis Tertius" in early 1940, Borges was little known outside of Argentina. He was working in a local public library in Buenos Aires and had certain local fame as a translator of works from English, French, and German, and as an avant-garde poet and essayist (having published regularly in widely read Argentinian periodicals such as El Hogar, as well as in many smaller magazines, such as Victoria Ocampo's Sur, where "Tlön..." was originally published). In the previous two years, he had been through a great deal: his father had died in 1938, and on Christmas Eve 1938, Borges himself had suffered a severe head wound in an accident; during treatment for that wound, he nearly died of a blood infection.

For some time before his father's death and his accident, Borges had been drifting toward writing fiction. His Historia universal de la infamia (Universal History of Infamy), published in 1935, used a baroque writing style and the techniques of fiction to tell the stories of seven historical rogues. These ranged from "El espantoso redentor Lazarus Morell" ("The Dread Redeemer Lazarus Morell")—who promised liberty to slaves in the American South, but brought them only death—to "El incivil maestro de ceremonias Kotsuké no Suké" ("The Insulting Master of Etiquette Kôtsuké no Suké"), the story of the central figure in the Japanese Tale of the 47 Ronin, also known as Kira Kozuke-no-Suke Yoshinaka. Borges had also written a number of clever literary forgeries disguised as translations from authors such as Emanuel Swedenborg or from Don Juan Manuel's Tales of Count Lucanor. Recovering from his head wound and infection, Borges decided it was time to turn to the writing of fiction as such.

Several of these fictions, notably "Tlön, Uqbar, Orbis Tertius" and "Pierre Menard, autor del Quijote" ("Pierre Menard, Author of the Quixote", published 10 months earlier in Sur, and also included in El jardín de senderos que se bifurcan), could only have been written by an experienced essayist. Both of these works apply Borges's essayistic style to the largely imaginary subject matter. His massive erudition is as evident in these fictions as in any non-fictional essay in his body of works.

Buenos Aires was, at this time, a thriving intellectual center. While Europe was immersed in World War II, Argentina, and Buenos Aires in particular, flourished intellectually and artistically. (This situation was to change during the presidency of Juan Perón and the subsequent military governments, when many of Argentina's leading intellectuals went into exile, something that Borges and most of his circle did not contemplate.)

Borges's first volume of fiction failed to garner the literary prizes many in his circle expected for it. Victoria Ocampo dedicated a large portion of the July 1942 issue of Sur to a "Reparation for Borges"; numerous leading writers and critics from Argentina and throughout the Spanish-speaking world contributed writings to the project, which probably brought his work as much attention as a prize would have.

Over the next few decades "Tlön, Uqbar, Orbis Tertius" and Borges's other fiction from this period formed a key part of the body of work that put Latin America on the international literary map. Borges was to become more widely known throughout the world as a writer of extremely original short stories than as a poet and essayist.

== Publication history ==
"Tlön, Uqbar, Orbis Tertius" originally appeared, in Spanish, in Sur in May 1940. The Spanish-language original was then published in book form in Antología de la literatura fantástica (December 1940; later translated in English as The Book of Fantasy), then in Borges's 1941 collection El Jardín de senderos que se bifurcan (The Garden of Forking Paths). That entire book was, in turn, included within Ficciones (1944), a much-reprinted book (15 editions in Argentina by 1971).

The first published English-language translation was by James E. Irby. It appeared in the April 1961 issue of New World Writing. The following year, Irby's translation was included as the first piece in a diverse collection of Borges works titled Labyrinths. Almost simultaneously, and independently, the piece was translated by Alastair Reid; Reid's version was published in 1962 as part of a collaborative English-language translation of the entirety of Ficciones. The Reid translation is reprinted in Borges, a Reader (1981, ISBN 0-525-47654-7), p. 111–122. Quotations and page references in this article follow that translation.

It was a finalist for the Retro Hugo Award for Best Short Story from 1940 (in 2016). It is the first non-English work to be nominated in its original language rather than as a translation.

According to the Norwegian writer Karl Ove Knausgård, "Tlon, Uqbar, Orbis Tertius" is "the best short story ever written."

== Influence on later works ==
"Tlön, Uqbar, Orbis Tertius" has inspired a number of real-world projects:

- "Prisoners of Uqbaristan", a short story by Chris Nakashima-Brown that is heavily influenced by the philosophy of Tlön.
- Codex Seraphinianus, a mock encyclopedia by Luigi Serafini, describes a surreal world entirely in drawings, an invented alphabet, and a fictional language.
- Ummo, a hoax of more than one thousand pages of pictures and text in letter form, describes an extraterrestrial civilization and its contact with Earth. UFO researcher Jacques Vallée has specifically likened Ummo to "Tlön, Uqbar ...".
- "Doom Patrol", a DC Comics series by Grant Morrison, features Orqwith, an imagined city which consumes worlds; it is summoned into reality through the tactile language of an encyclopedia composed by the same process as in Borges’s story.
- Tlön is featured in the Marvel Comics series Secret Avengers as a dimension from which M.O.D.O.K. summons monsters in an attempt to destroy the Earth.

Several other projects have names derived from the story:

- Axaxaxas mlö is the title of a fictional book mentioned in another Borges short story, "The Library of Babel".
- hlör u fang axaxaxas mlö, taken from the example of the Tlön language described in the story, is the title of a chamber music piece for clarinet, violin, cello, and piano by Colombian-American composer Diego Vega, which won the 2004 Colombian National Prize for Music Composition, awarded by the Colombian Ministry of Culture.
- Tlön Uqbar is a joint project of French industrial bands Internal Fusion and Désaccord Majeur.
- Uqbar, a browser/reader for Project Gutenberg etexts, in pre-alpha as of 2006.
- Tlon is the name of the company developing computing platform Urbit.

W. G. Sebald refers to Tlön and its philosophy in his book The Rings of Saturn.

== Bibliography ==
- The Encyclopaedia of Islam, New Edition, Vol. VI "Mahk-Mid" (Leiden, E.J. Brill, 1991), pp. 790b-791a on Al-‘Ukbarî; Vol. X "T-U", page 435a for ‘Uqbâr in the Atlas Mountains of Algeria.
- Ibn Khordâdhbeh, edited and translated into French by M. J. de Goeje (Leiden, E.J. Brill, 1889, in their series Bibliotheca Geographorum Arabicorum) on the place ‘Ukbarâ.
- The Jewish Encyclopedia article "Okbara and Okbarites" is simply a cross reference to their article "Meshwi al-‘Ukbari".
- Isidore Singer and Isaac Broydé, Jewish Encyclopedia article on "Meshwi al-‘Ukbari"
