= The Immortal (short story) =

1947 short story by Jorge Luis Borges

- Short story by Jorge Luis Borges
- Original title: El Inmortal
- Country: Argentina
- Language: Spanish
- Genre: Short story

Publication
- Media type: Print
- Publication date: 1947

"The Immortal" (original Spanish title: "El inmortal") is a short story by Argentine writer Jorge Luis Borges, first published in February 1947, and later in the collection El Aleph in 1949. The story tells about a character who mistakenly achieves immortality and then, weary of a long life, struggles to lose it and writes an account of his experiences. The story consists of a quote, an introduction, five chapters, and a postscript. "The Immortal" has been described as "the culmination of Borges' art" by critic Ronald J. Christ.

== Plot summary ==
Borges begins by quoting Francis Bacon's Essays, LVIII. "Salomon saith, There is no new thing upon the earth. So that as Plato had an imagination, that all knowledge was but remembrance; so Salomon giveth his sentence, that all novelty is but oblivion."

The introduction takes place in London in the first part of June 1929. Herein the following five chapters are purported to have been found in the last of six volumes in small quarto (1715–20) of Alexander Pope's Iliad, given to the Princess of Lucinge by a seller of rare books named Joseph Cartaphilus.

The story is an autobiographical tale told by a Roman soldier, Marcus Flaminius Rufus, during the reign of the emperor Diocletian. During a sleepless night in Thebes, Egypt, a mysterious man, exhausted and wounded, seeks refuge in his camp. Just before dying, he tells Rufus about a river whose waters bestow immortality on whoever drinks from it. The river is next to a place called the City of the Immortals. Determined to find it, Rufus sets out for Africa with his soldiers. The harsh conditions of the trip cause many of his men to desert. After hearing that the remaining soldiers are planning his death, Rufus flees and wanders through the desert.

Rufus wakes up from a nightmare to find himself tied up in a small recess on the side of a mountain inhabited by Troglodytes. Down below, he spots a polluted stream and jumps down to drink from it; wounded, he falls asleep. Over the next few days, he recovers and, seeing the City of the Immortals in the distance, is able to walk there, followed by a Troglodyte.

The City of the Immortals is an immense labyrinth with dead-end passages, inverted stairways, and many chaotic architectural structures. Rufus, horrified and repulsed by the city, describes it as "a chaos of heterogeneous words, the body of a tiger or a bull in which teeth, organs and heads monstrously pullulate in mutual conjunction and hatred". He eventually escapes the city and finds the Troglodyte who followed him there waiting outside; he names him Argos (after the dog of Odysseus), and decides to teach him language. Soon after, though, Argos reveals that he is Homer, and that the Troglodytes are the Immortals, having destroyed the original City of the Immortals and (on the advice of Homer) replaced it with the labyrinth Rufus encountered.

Rufus spends centuries living with the Immortals, mostly immersed in thought, until the notion of the existence of a river with the powers to "take away" immortality causes the group to scatter in search of it in the tenth century. Rufus wanders the world, fighting at Stamford Bridge, transcribing the voyages of Sindbad the Sailor, and buying the aforementioned edition of Pope's Iliad in 1714. In 1921, Rufus' ship runs aground in Eritrea while en route to Bombay, and he drinks from a spring, losing his immortality.

In the end, Rufus realizes that he has incorporated the experiences and words of Homer into his tale, but concludes that "I have been Homer; soon, like Ulysses, I shall be Nobody; soon, I shall be all men—I shall be dead." Rufus is, in fact, the bookseller Cartaphilus, who, we learn at the beginning of the story, dies in October 1929 while returning to Smyrna.

The story ends with a brief postscript which discusses the fictional book A Coat of Many Colors by Dr. Nahum Cordovero, which argues that the tale of Rufus/Cartaphilus is apocryphal, on the basis of its interpolations of texts by Pliny, Thomas De Quincey, René Descartes and George Bernard Shaw. The postscript ends with the unknown author of the postscript rejecting Cordovero's claim.

== Analysis ==
"The Immortal" deals with several themes which are present throughout much of Borges' writing; one such theme is immortality. Borges' conception of immortality assumes various manifestations throughout his writing and even in this clearly titled piece of work, it is not clear exactly who is meant to be the immortal. On one hand, Rufus is clearly searching for the city of the immortals and therefore the being that he finds there must in fact be the immortal. However, it could also be said that Rufus becomes the immortal once he embarks upon his journey. In this sense, Borges' immortality has to do with a Nietzsche-inspired humanist immortality which revolves around the super-abundant development of the person as an individual. This theme is also developed in "The Circular Ruins", "The Garden of Forking Paths", "The Sect of the Phoenix" and, in a sense, throughout all of Borges' writing.

Another theme present is the infinite, which can also be found in much of Borges' writing. The constant symbol of the infinite is the labyrinth, which represents a dynamic of personal choice within the infinite permutations of existence. The troglodyte who makes patterns in the sand and the hero (Rufus) who finds himself questing after and achieving immortality should be seen as synonymous, all-encompassing representations of the choosing individual within the infinite flux of the universe's permutations. As such, the infinite represents complete contradiction of the individual and also its validation.

"The Immortal" has been described as a fictional exploration of Nietzsche's theory of eternal recurrence, in which infinite time has wiped out the identity of individuals. The story can be compared to Homer's Odyssey, in the sense that it is a tribute to the universal, mythical proportion of Homer's work. The Immortal displays Borges' literary irony, fusing Swiftian satire, George Bernard Shaw's creative evolution in Back to Methusela, and the dream visions of Thomas De Quincey in a single work. Borges also comments on literary idealism in which the identities of component authors Homer, Shakespeare and Borges himself appear to merge into one another.
