= Ficciones =

Book by Jorge Luis Borges

- First edition
- Author: Jorge Luis Borges
- Original title: Ficciones
- Translator: various
- Language: Spanish
- Publisher: Editorial Sur (1944); Emecé (1956)
- Publication date: 1941–2, 1944, 1956
- Publication place: Argentina
- English publication date: 1962 by Grove Press
- Media type: Print
- Pages: 203pp (1944); 197pp (1956)

Ficciones (in English: "Fictions") is a collection of short stories by Argentine writer and poet Jorge Luis Borges, originally written and published in Spanish between 1941 and 1956. Thirteen stories from Ficciones were first published by New Directions in the English-language anthology Labyrinths (1962). In the same year, Grove Press published the entirety of the book in English, using the same title as in the original language. "The Approach to Al-Mu'tasim" originally appeared published in A History of Eternity (Historia de la eternidad) (1936). Ficciones became Borges's most famous book and made him known worldwide.

The book is dedicated to writer Esther Zemborain de Torres Duggan, a friend and collaborator of Borges's.

== Background ==
=== Publication ===
In 1941, Borges's second collection of fiction, El jardín de senderos que se bifurcan (English: The Garden of Forking Paths) was published. It contained eight stories. In 1944, a new section labeled Artificios ("Artifices"), containing six stories, was added to the eight of The Garden of Forking Paths. These were given the collective title Ficciones. Borges added three more stories to the Artifices section in the 1956 edition.

=== Translation ===
In 1948, the story "The Garden of Forking Paths" was translated into English by Anthony Boucher and published in Ellery Queen's Mystery Magazine.

In 1962, an English translation of Ficciones was published by Grove Press. Edited and introduced by Anthony Kerrigan, the other translators were Anthony Bonner, Alastair Reid, Helen Temple, and Ruthven Todd.

== Contents ==
- Part One: The Garden of Forking Paths
  - Prologue
  - "Tlön, Uqbar, Orbis Tertius" (1940)
  - "The Approach to Al-Mu'tasim" (1936, not included in the 1941 edition)
  - "Pierre Menard, Author of the Quixote" (1939)
  - "The Circular Ruins" (1940)
  - "The Lottery in Babylon" (1941)
  - "An Examination of the Work of Herbert Quain" (1941)
  - "The Library of Babel" (1941)
  - "The Garden of Forking Paths" (1941)
- Part Two: Artifices
  - Prologue
  - "Funes the Memorious" (1942)
  - "The Form of the Sword" (1942)
  - "Theme of the Traitor and the Hero" (1944)
  - "Death and the Compass" (1942)
  - "The Secret Miracle" (1943)
  - "Three Versions of Judas" (1944)
  - "The End" (1953, 2nd edition only)
  - "The Sect of the Phoenix" (1952, 2nd edition only)
  - "The South" (1953, 2nd edition only)

== Style ==
Ficciones emphasizes and calls attention to its fictional nature. The choice and use of literary devices are conspicuous in the stories. Naomi Lindstrom explains that Borges saw an effort to make a story appear natural "as an impoverishment of fiction's possibilities and falsification of its artistic character."

== Themes ==
The labyrinth is a recurring motif throughout the stories. It is used as a metaphor to represent a variety of things: the overwhelmingly complex nature of worlds and the systems that exist within them, human enterprises, the physical and mental aspects of humans, and abstract concepts such as time. The stories of Borges can be seen as a type of labyrinth themselves.

Borges often gives his first-person narrators the name "Borges." While he imparts many of his own characteristics in them, he does not idealize them, and gives them human failings as well.

Borges often puts his protagonists in red enclosures. This has led to analysis of his stories from a Freudian viewpoint, although Borges himself strongly disliked his work being interpreted in such a way. In fact, he called psychoanalysis (Obra poética, Prólogo) "la triste mitología de nuestro tiempo", or "the sad mythology of our time".

Borges loved books and gives detailed descriptions of the characteristics of the fictional texts in his stories. In "The Approach to Al-Mu'tasim", he indirectly suggests that a librarian is even holier than a saint.

Other themes throughout his stories include: philosophical issues; deterioration and ruination; games of strategy and chance; conspiracies and secret societies; and ethnic groups, especially those in his own ancestry.

== Reception ==
Ficciones is one of Le Monde's 100 Books of the Century.

According to the Norwegian writer Karl Ove Knausgaard, the first story in Ficciones, "Tlön, Uqbar, Orbis Tertius", is "the best short story ever written."
