= The Lottery in Babylon =

- Short story by Jorge Luis Borges
- Original title: La lotería en Babilonia
- Translator: John M. Fain, Anthony Kerrigan, Norman Thomas di Giovanni, Andrew Hurley
- Country: Argentina
- Language: Spanish
- Genres: Fantasy, short story

Publication
- Published in: Ficciones
- Media type: Print
- Publication date: 1941
- Published in English: 1962

"The Lottery in Babylon" (original Spanish: "La lotería en Babilonia", "The Babylon Lottery") is a fantasy short story by Argentine writer Jorge Luis Borges. It first appeared in 1941 in the literary magazine Sur, and was then included in the 1941 collection The Garden of Forking Paths (El jardín de los senderos que se bifurcan), which in turn became part one of Ficciones (1944). Translated into English by John M. Fein, it was published in Prairie Schooner, Fall 1959, and in Labyrinths (New Directions, 1962).

== Plot summary ==
The story describes a mythical Babylon in which all activities are dictated by an all-encompassing lottery, which people must live by, and has full control over many's lives, a metaphor for the role of chance in one's life. Initially, the lottery was run as a lottery would be, with tickets purchased and the winner receiving a monetary reward. Later, punishments and larger monetary rewards were introduced. Further, participation became mandatory for all but the elite. Finally, it simultaneously became so all-encompassing and so secret some whispered "the Company has never existed, and never will," and some even posited that the question of the existence of the Company was irrelevant, as Babylon "is nothing but an infinite game of chance." But some places, including "a sacred latrine called Qaphqa [Kafka], ... it was generally believed, gave access to the Company".

== Themes ==
The story is about the role that chance plays in life, whether occurrences are genuinely deserved or whether all of life is merely based on luck or loss. The story references Zeno's paradox by using the lottery as a metaphor for all the possible random occurrences that could occur between any two points in time. As with fate, the Babylonians attempted to gain control of the lottery by whispering in secret places, though the lottery eventually banned this as a liability. The story may be a criticism of the tendency of humans to claim the authority of nature and capitalize on it, as the Company does with chance. The Lottery cannot be challenged, as it is based on the absolute that is chance. As with most Borges stories, there is a bit of humor in this. At one point, a slave steals a lottery ticket that calls for the bearer's tongue to be burned off, which is the same penalty as for stealing a lottery ticket. The public then argues over whether the slave should be punished because it is the penalty for stealing or because it is what the ticket decreed.

== See also ==
- Rota Fortunae - the wheel of fortune
- "The Lottery" - short story by Shirley Jackson
