= Arturo Belano =

Literary character and the alter ego of Roberto Bolaño

Arturo Belano is a literary character and the alter ego of the Chilean writer Roberto Bolaño. The given name is due to that of Arthur Rimbaud, French poet for whom Bolaño felt great admiration. The character's first appearance was in the novella Distant Star, where it is implied he is the narrator, while his most prominent role was in The Savage Detectives where he and fellow writer Ulises Lima are the central characters. Belano also appears in several short stories and in the novella Amulet; he is of the same age and nationality as Bolaño, with many shared elements in their biographies including a move from Chile to Mexico in their teens with their families, traveling around the world, and finally settling in Spain.

== Appearances ==
- Distant Star (1996) - as Arturo B.; narrator and character. in the introduction he is described as "a fellow Chilean...a veteran of Latin America's doomed revolutions, who tried to get himself killed in Africa." Bolaño explains that Arturo told him a shorter version of the story, which appears as the final chapter of Nazi Literature in the Americas, but Arturo was displeased with the outcome:

"So we took that final chapter and shut ourselves up for a month and a half in my house in Blanes, where, guided by his dreams and nightmares, we composed the present novel. My role was limited to preparing refreshments, consulting a few books, and discussing the reuse of numerous paragraphs with Arturo and the increasingly animated ghost of Pierre Menard."

- The Savage Detectives (1998) - main character
- Amulet (1999) - secondary character mentioned by the narrator/protagonist Auxilio Lacouture as her "favorite young poet, although he wasn't Mexican," and revealed to be of the same age and nationality as Bolaño:

"I thought about young Arturo Belano, who was sixteen or seventeen when I met him in 1970. I was the mother of the new Mexican poetry and he was just a kid who couldn't hold his liquor, but he was proud that Salvador Allende had been elected president of his faraway Chile."

- 2666 (2004) - narrator, though this is not stated explicitly in the novel:

Among Bolaño's notes for 2666 there appears the single line: "the narrator of 2666 is Arturo Belano." And elsewhere Bolaño adds, with the indication "for the end of 2666":"And that's it, friends. I've done it all, I've lived it all. If I had the strength, I'd cry. I bid you all goodbye, Arturo Belano."

=== Short stories ===
- "The Grub" (collected in Last Evenings on Earth, 2006) - narrator and protagonist; the story takes place in Mexico City in the 1970s, where the 17-year-old Belano spends his days browsing bookstores and watching movies. He strikes up an odd friendship with a man, whom he calls "the grub", who sits on the same bench every day, doing nothing.
- "Enrique Martín" (collected in Last Evenings on Earth, 2006) - narrator
- "Photos" (collected in The Return, 2010) - protagonist; the story consists of his thoughts narrated in the third person.
- "Detectives" (collected in The Return, 2010) - mentioned parenthetically
- "The Old Man and the Mountain" (collected in The Secret of Evil, 2012) - protagonist; the story consists of a short summary of his friendship with fellow writer Ulises Lima
- "Death of Ulises" (collected in The Secret of Evil, 2012) - protagonist.
- "The Days of Chaos" (collected in The Secret of Evil, 2012) - protagonist.

=== Parallel characters ===
Twelve of Bolaño's stories are told in the first person by an unnamed "I" who seems consistent with both Bolaño the writer and the character Belano:

- "Sensini"
- "Mauricio 'The Eye' Silva"
- "Gomez Palacio"
- "Dentist"
- "Dance Card"
- "Cell Mates"
- "Clara"
- "Meeting with Enrique Lihn"
- "Jim"
- "Colonia Lindavista"
- "The Room Next Door"
- "I Can't Read"

Five third-person stories concern a character called B, but it is unclear how this character is related to either Belano or Bolaño:

- "A Literary Adventure"
- "Phone Calls"
- "Last Evenings on Earth"
- "Days of 1978"
- "Vagabond in France and Belgium"
