= Nazi Literature in the Americas =

1996 novel by Roberto Bolaño

- First edition (Spanish)
- Author: Roberto Bolaño
- Original title: La literatura nazi en América
- Translator: Chris Andrews
- Language: Spanish
- Publisher: Seix Barral (Spanish); New Directions (English)
- Publication date: 1996
- Publication place: Spain
- English publication date: 2008
- Media type: Print (Cloth)
- Pages: 237
- ISBN: 8432247529

Nazi Literature in the Americas (Spanish: La literatura nazi en América) is a work of fiction by the Chilean author Roberto Bolaño. It was published in 1996, being later republished by Anagrama. Chris Andrews’ English translation was published in 2008 by New Directions and was shortlisted for the 2008 Best Translated Book Award.

== Summary ==
Nazi Literature in the Americas presents itself as an encyclopedia of right-wing writers. The book is composed of short biographies of imaginary Pan-American authors. The literary Nazis—fascists and ultra-right sympathizers and zealots, most from South America, a few from North America—portrayed in that book are a gallery of self-deluded mediocrities, snobs, opportunists, narcissists, and criminals. About Nazi Literature in the Americas, Bolaño told an interviewer:

(Its) focus is on the world of the ultra right, but much of the time, in reality, I'm talking about the left... When I'm talking about Nazi writers in the Americas, in reality I'm talking about the world, sometimes heroic but much more often despicable, of literature in general.

Although the writers are invented, they are all carefully situated in real literary worlds: Bolaño's characters rebuff Allen Ginsberg’s advances in Greenwich Village, encounter Octavio Paz in Mexico City, and quarrel with José Lezama Lima in Cuba.

Forerunners to this type of fictional writer biographies can be seen in the short stories of Jorge Luis Borges, particularly "Pierre Menard, Author of the Quixote" and "An Examination of the Work of Herbert Quain". Bolaño has also praised the work of J. Rodolfo Wilcock, a member of Borges' cohort, whose "La Sinagoga de Los Iconoclastas" (Temple of the Iconoclasts) similarly consists of short biographies of imaginary figures, in Wilcock's case, crackpot scholars and inventors.

== Contents ==
- The Mendiluce Clan

Presents the Argentinian poet Edelmira Thompson de Mendiluce, her son Juan Mendiluce Thompson, and her daughter Luz Mendiluce Thompson. Edelmira, a wealthy widow, among other ventures, attempts to create a room based on Edgar Allan Poe's essay "Philosophy of Furniture" and founds The Fourth Reich in Argentina, a literary magazine and publishing house which publish works by several of the writers appearing later in the book. Juan is a novelist and politician while Luz is a talented but troubled poet who suffers failed marriages, struggles with alcoholism and overweight, and is eventually doomed by her love for a much younger woman.

- Itinerant Heroes or the Fragility of Mirrors

Ignacio Zubieta, the young scion of a wealthy Bogota family, and his frenemy Jesús Fernández-Gómez, a poor novelist from Cartagena, migrate to Spain just before the Civil War. After making a name in the Spanish cultural life, they enlist in the Blue Division and fight for the German Army until the Battle of Berlin, where both die. Most of their work is posthumous.

- Forerunners and Figures of the Anti-Enlightenment
  - Mateo Aguirre Bengoechea
  - Silvio Salvático
  - Luiz Fontaine Da Souza
  - Ernesto Pérez Masón
- Poètes Maudits
  - Pedro González Carrera
  - Andres Cepeda Cepeda, known as The Page
- Wandering Women of Letters
  - Irma Carrasco
  - Daniela de Montecristo
- Two Germans at the Ends of the Earth
  - Franz Zwickau
  - Willy Schürholz
- Speculative and Science Fiction
  - J.M.S. Hill
  - Zach Sodenstern
  - Gustavo Borda
- Magicians, Mercenaries and Miserable Creatures
  - Segundo José Heredia
  - Amado Couto
  - Carlos Hevia
  - Harry Sibelius
- The Many Masks of Max Mirebalais
  - Max Mirebalais, alias Max Kasimir, Max von Hauptman, Max Le Gueule, Jacques Artibonito
- North American Poets
  - Jim O'Bannon
  - Rory Long
- The Aryan Brotherhood
  - Thomas R. Murchison, alias The Texan
  - John Lee Brook
- The Fabulous Schiaffino Boys
  - Italo Schiaffino
  - Argentino Schiaffino, alias Fatso
- The Infamous Ramírez Hoffman

This section differs in tone from the rest of the book, rather than being delivered as a dry encyclopedic entry it is narrated by a character, named Bolaño, who was a witness to some of the events. The story was later expanded into the novella Distant Star, with the name of the protagonist changed to Alberto Ruiz-Tagle. This is explained in the introduction to the novel thus:

In the final chapter of my novel Nazi Literature in the Americas I recounted, in less than twenty pages and perhaps too schematically, the story of Lieutenant Ramirez Hoffman of the Chilean Air Force, which I heard from a fellow Chilean, Arturo B. [...] He was not satisfied with my version [...] So we took that final chapter and shut ourselves up for a month and a half in my house in Blanes, where, guided by his dreams and nightmares, we composed the present novel.

- Epilogue for Monsters
  - Secondary Figures
  - Publishing Houses, Magazines, Places...
  - Books

== Critical reception ==
Stacey D'Erasmo, in a review for The New York Times, describes Nazi Literature in the Americas as:

“a wicked, invented encyclopedia of imaginary fascist writers and literary tastemakers, is Bolaño playing with sharp, twisting knives. As if he were Borges’s wisecracking, sardonic son, Bolaño has meticulously created a tightly woven network of far-right littérateurs and purveyors of belles lettres for whom Hitler was beauty, truth and great lost hope."

Michael Dirda, of The Washington Post found that the novel, "very much deserves reading: It is imaginative, full of a love for literature, and, unlikely as it may seem, exceptionally entertaining." John Brenkman of The Village Voice sees the book as both a satire and an elegy, stating,

"Nazi Literature in the Americas is first of all a prank, an act of genius wasting its time in parodic attacks on a hated sort of writer. But beyond that, it produces an unsettling mix of overt satire and covert elegy. The reductive force of summary after summary starts to have an effect that transcends the satire; the book begins to convey a sense of the vanity of human endeavor and the ease with which a lifetime's work might be flicked into oblivion by a witty remark."

Giles Harvey, writing for The New Yorker, included the novel in his list of Bolaño's best work, explaining that:

"This mock reference book of imaginary right-wing litterateurs — including soccer-hooligans-cum poets and a sci-fi novelist who excitedly envisages Hitler’s Reich triumphing in the United States — is every bit as fun as it sounds. Like David Thomson’s Biographical Dictionary of Film or, indeed, Philip Rees’s non-fictional Biographical Dictionary of the Extreme Right, Nazi Literature is not a book to read straight through, but rather to dip into whenever the mood (in this case a rather dark, antisocial mood) takes you."

In a dissenting opinion Alberto Manguel, writing for The Guardian, finds the novel is,

"at first mildly amusing but quickly becomes a tedious pastiche of itself. Like a joke whose punchline is given in the title, the humour is undermined, and all that is left is a series of names, dates and titles that, since they don't come across as funny, become merely irritating [...] It is not enough to invent a character and lend it a name and a bibliography and a few circumstantial details; something must justify its existence on the page, which otherwise risks resembling an annotated phonebook."

Paul Grimstad of Columbia University wonders whether the idea of the work was hinted at by Stanislaw Lem's review of a fictional book Gruppenführer Louis XVI in the collection A Perfect Vacuum.

Publishers Weekly opined in a brief review that "The wild inventiveness of Bolaño’s evocations places them squarely in the realm of Borges—another writer who draws enormous power from the movement between the fictive and the real."
