= Pierre Menard, Author of the Quixote =

- Short story by Jorge Luis Borges
- Translator: Anthony Bonner
- Country: Argentina
- Language: Spanish
- Genre: Metafictional short story

Publication
- Published in: Sur
- Media type: Print
- Publication date: May 1939
- Published in English: 1962

"Pierre Menard, Author of the Quixote" (original Spanish title: "Pierre Menard, autor del Quijote") is a short story by Argentine writer Jorge Luis Borges.

It originally appeared in Spanish in the Argentine journal Sur in May 1939. The Spanish-language original was first published in book form in Borges's 1941 collection El jardín de senderos que se bifurcan (The Garden of Forking Paths), which was included in his much-reprinted Ficciones (1944).

== Plot summary ==
"Pierre Menard, Author of the Quixote" is written in the form of a review or literary critical piece about Pierre Menard, a fictional eccentric 20th-century French writer and polymath. It begins with a brief introduction and a listing of Menard's work.

Borges's "review" describes Menard's efforts to go beyond a mere "translation" of Don Quixote by immersing himself so thoroughly in the work as to be able to actually "re-create" it, line for line, in the original 17th-century Spanish. Thus, Pierre Menard is often used to raise questions and discussion about the nature of authorship, appropriation, and interpretation.

Argentine writer and critic Enrique Anderson Imbert includes in his book Reloj de arena (an anthology with works whose plots coincide with famous works published later) a story with content very similar to "Pierre Menard". It was published sixteen years before Borges's story under the title "Corputt", and its author is a Polish-American writer, Tupper Greenwald. The character in the story is a great admirer of Shakespeare, in particular King Lear. His dream is to write a drama as perfect as Lear. Close to death, he confesses to a colleague his ambition and adds that the night before he managed to finish the dream play. He takes out a manuscript from under his pillow and reads to his colleague the most important lines. The text he wrote and now reads coincides exactly with the text of King Lear.

== Analysis ==
"Pierre Menard, Author of the Quixote" is a form of literary criticism, but through the medium of fantasy, irony, and humor. His narrator/reviewer considers Menard's fragmentary Quixote (which is line-for-line identical to the original) to be much richer in allusion than Miguel de Cervantes' "original" work because Menard's must be considered in light of world events since 1602. Cervantes, the reviewer claims, "indulges in a rather coarse opposition between tales of knighthood and the meager, provincial reality of his country". While Menard writes of the distant past ("the land of Carmen during the century of Lepanto and Lope"), in Cervantes "there are neither bands of Gypsies, conquistadors ... nor autos de fé". In "The Library of Babel", Borges contemplates the opposite effect: impoverishment of a text through the means of its reproduction. In a pattern analogous to the infinite monkey theorem, all texts are reproduced in a vast library only because complete randomness eventually reproduces all possible combinations of letters.

Both stories deal with the difficulty of creating meaning or perhaps finding or determining meaning. In the case of "Quixote", the meaning depends on reader-response or context of the work. In the case of "The Library of Babel", meaning is hard to find as any coherent works are rare. By implication the library contains all possible works. However, any work with apparent meaning is random and not the product of human action, and is therefore drained of meaning. In the case of "Quixote", the human actions of writing and reading the work affect its meaning.

Borges wrote the story while recovering from a head injury. It was intended as a test to discover whether his creativity had survived the severe septicaemia that had set in after his head wound became infected. Following its completion, Borges was satisfied that his creativity remained and thus proceeded to write the rest of the stories that later made up the book El jardín de senderos que se bifurcan. As so often in his writings, the story abounds in clever references and subtle jokes. His narrator/reviewer is an arch-Catholic who remarks of the readers of a rival journal that they are "few and Calvinist, if not Masonic and circumcised". According to Emir Rodríguez Monegal and Alastair Reid, Menard is in part "a caricature of Stéphane Mallarmé and Paul Valéry ... or Miguel de Unamuno and Enrique Larreta".

== Publishing history ==
Two English-language translations were published more or less simultaneously in 1962: one by James E. Irby in a diverse collection of Borges works entitled Labyrinths; the other by Anthony Bonner as part of a collaborative translation of the entirety of Ficciones (1962). The Bonner translation is reprinted in Borges, A Reader.

== Source of the name ==
Borges describes his Pierre Menard as the grandson of Louis Menard, who is not otherwise identified. Borges's biographer Emir Rodríguez Monegal notes that this name belonged to a real person, Louis Ménard, a self-described "pagan mystic" who was observed by contemporary Remy de Gourmont to have composed a work called Prometheus Unbound in both French and Ancient Greek. Gourmont describes this in florid language, saying that Ménard's "ambition already seemed to penetrate Greek thought, to reconstitute the lost works of the great tragedies, and he composed a Prometheus Unbound, which, for the convenience of readers, he wrote in French, but it might have been more agreeable to him to write in the language of Aeschylus, as he did at the same time."

== Influence ==
In his foreword to P. G. Wodehouse's Sunset at Blandings, Douglas Adams recommended the story: "You should read Jorge Luis Borges's short story 'Pierre Menard, Author of the Quixote'. It's only six pages long, and you'll be wanting to drop me a postcard to thank me for pointing it out to you." The foreword was reprinted in Adams's posthumously published collection of writings, The Salmon of Doubt.

In Italo Calvino's If on a Winter's Night a Traveler (1979) the character Silas Flannery tries to copy a "famous novel" to gain the energy from that text for his own writing, and finally he feels tempted to copy the entire novel Crime and Punishment. This technique was actually attempted by Hunter S. Thompson, who retyped the entirety of The Great Gatsby when he studied at Columbia University, prior to the writing of any of his major works.

John Hodgman claims to have made a "controversial shot-by-shot remake" of "Pierre Menard" in the "page-a-day calendar" portion of his book More Information Than You Require, on the date 4 December 1998. The joke references not only the recreation nature of the original short story, but also Gus Van Sant's shot-for-shot remake of Psycho, which was released on the same date.

City of Glass by Paul Auster seems to be an homage to Jorge Luis Borges. The character Peter Stillman Snr. is obsessed with the Tower of Babel (as in "The Library of Babel") and the character (as opposed to the author) named "Paul Auster" is writing an essay which discusses the "true" authorship of the Quixote.

The story is also referenced in the introduction to Roberto Bolaño's novel Distant Star, and along with "An Examination of the Work of Herbert Quain" has a noticeable influence on his other works, particularly Nazi Literature in the Americas.

The story is referenced in the CD notes of Mostly Other People Do the Killing's 2014 album Blue, which is an exacting replica of Miles Davis' famous 1959 album Kind of Blue.

The translator of the novel The Missing Shade of Blue (by Jennie Erdal) into Portuguese adopted the pseudonym Pierre Menard.

The novel Pale Fire by Vladimir Nabokov expands the concept of the 'frame narrative' of Borges's story, expanding this conceit into a novel-length structure in which a commentator appears, at first, to be simply analyzing the work of another character (a 999-line poem, which the novel actually features) and doing so in good faith, before it becomes increasingly difficult for the reader to separate the truth about the lives of the two characters from the manner in which the commentary begins to dominate and manipulate the meaning of the fictional author's text to tell the commentator's own story.

Much as the narrator of Borges's story offers a list of Pierre Menard's fictional publications, the novel Infinite Jest by David Foster Wallace contains a patience-testing list of the film credits of one of the characters, expanding the comedic possibilities of the structure of fictional references by offering both titles and sometimes-lengthy descriptions of the highly improbable (or downright impossible) films.

The story's suggestion that the reader's sense of the meaning of any text is contingent on how they attribute the text to its presumed author (since the reader attempts to interpret the text in terms of the author's life, works, beliefs, etc. for better or worse or on to absurdity, as the story ultimately suggests) is a prefiguring of the post-structuralist turn toward the de-centering of the author (that is, the de-centering of the author as ultimate authority or anchor of a text's meaning) as argued most famously by Roland Barthes in his 1967 essay "La Mort de l'Auteur" ("The Death of the Author") and by Michel Foucault in "What is an Author?"

The story is referenced in the Justice League Unlimited episode "The Balance". In the episode, members of the Justice League visit the Library of Tartarus, where Menard's story is said to reside.

It is additionally referenced in House of Leaves, by Mark Z. Danielewski, where Pierre Menard is made out to be a real person and an example of "exquisite variation". In the novel, a footnote by Zampanó references Pierre Menard and his "variation" on the passage beginning "... la verdad, cuya madre es la historia [etc]".

Pierre Menard is credited as the author of a book which was adapted into the screenplay of the 2011 film A Low Life Mythology.

The story is also referenced in TV show The Good Place, season 4, episode 13, "Whenever You're Ready", in a list of projects that character Tahani Al Jamil is working on in the afterlife. One of her projects is described as "Write "Tahani Al Jamil's 'Borges' "Pierre Menard, Author of the Quixote" ' ".

In the HBO series Los Espookys, season 2, episode 3, the character Tati decides to write a novel, which consists of transcribing an audiobook of Don Quixote.

In B. J. Novak's short story collection One More Thing, his story "J. C. Audetat, Translator of Don Quixote" references Borges's "Pierre Menard, Author of the Quixote" on two levels. Novak's story follows a fictional would-be poet named J. C. Audetat who finds an alternate route to literary fame by translating great works into accessible vernacular English. At the narrative level, J. C. Audetat's "translations" blur the line between plagiarism and creation, just as Pierre Menard's "writing" does in Borges's story. At the meta-textual level, Novak's story about plagiarism itself appropriates Borges's original concept, creating a recursive commentary on literary borrowing and originality.

== See also ==
- "Tlön, Uqbar, Orbis Tertius"
