= The Circular Ruins =

- Short story by Jorge Luis Borges
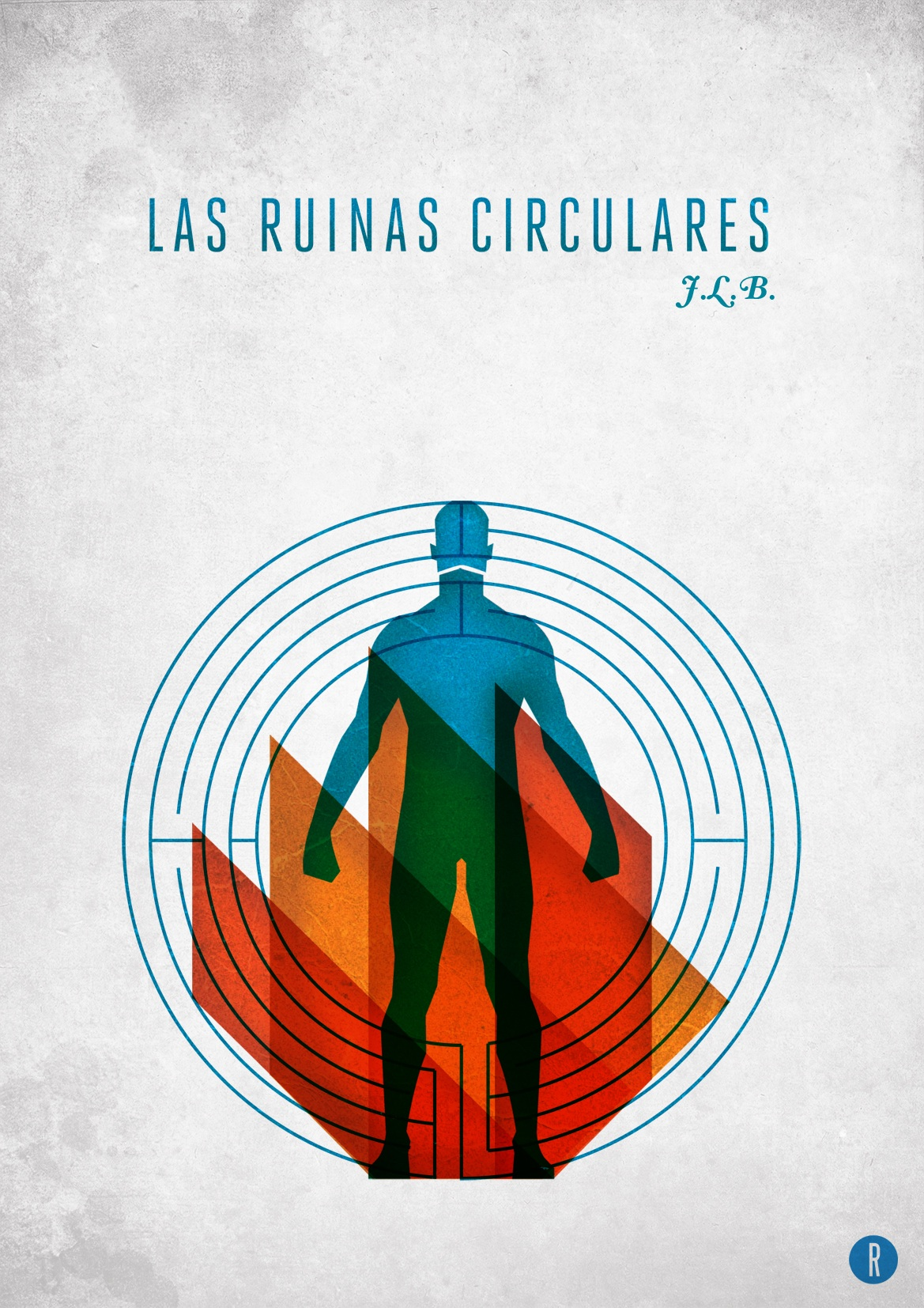
- Poster created to illustrate the story
- Original title: Las ruinas circulares
- Country: Argentina
- Language: Spanish
- Genres: Fantasy, short story

Publication
- Published in: Ficciones, Labyrinths
- Media type: Print
- Publication date: 1940
- Published in English: 1949
- Pages: 7 (Bantam 1971 ed.)

"The Circular Ruins" (Spanish: Las ruinas circulares) is a short story by Argentine author Jorge Luis Borges. First published in the literary journal Sur in December 1940, it was included in the 1941 collection The Garden of Forking Paths (Spanish: El jardín de senderos que se bifurcan) and the 1944 collection Ficciones. It was first published in English in View (Series V, No. 6 1946), translated by Paul Bowles. Since publication, it has become one of Borges's best-known stories.

The story is about a man who gradually dreams another man into existence in the ruins of an ancient temple. Though he is successful, the dreamer realizes at the story's conclusion that he himself is someone else's dream. Critics have interpreted "The Circular Ruins" as exploring themes of philosophical idealism, Gnosticism or kabbalism, and creativity.

== Plot ==
A man arrives by canoe at the burned ruins of an ancient temple. The temple is centered on the statue of an ambiguous deity that appears to be a tiger or a horse. The man immediately falls asleep; his goal, the narrator reveals, is to "dream a man with minute integrity and insert him into reality." Local villagers bring the man food, and he spends most of his time sleeping in the ruins.

At first, the man dreams that he is addressing a group of pupils on anatomy, cosmography, and magic; he hopes to find among his pupils "a soul which would merit participation in the universe." The man eventually narrows the group of students down to a boy who resembles him, but soon finds himself stricken with insomnia and unable to continue dreaming.

After taking a rest to regain his strength, the man attempts a different tactic: he begins to dream a man piece by piece, beginning with his heart and slowly adding other organs and features. The process takes over a year and is painstaking. Frustrated, the man consults the temple's deity, which in a dream is revealed to be a multifaceted deity known as "Fire" that also can appear as a bull, a rose, and a storm. Fire promises the man that he will bring the dreamed one into reality, and that everyone but Fire and the dreamer will believe the conjured man to be flesh and blood. Fire demands that after the conjured man's education is finished he be sent to another ruined temple downstream "so that in this deserted edifice a voice might give glory to the god."

The man spends two years instructing the conjured man, whom he comes to view as his son. Though he secretly dreads their separation, the man eventually sends his son to the second temple. Before he does so, though, he destroys his son's memory of his apprenticeship, "so that he would never know he was a phantom, so that he would be thought a man like others".

The man remains at his temple and hears word from travelers of his son, who is reportedly able to walk on fire without being burned. Though the man still worries his son will find out his true origins, his fears are interrupted by a forest fire that emerges from the south and envelops the ruined temple. Accepting death, the man walks into the flames. He feels no pain and realizes "with relief, with humiliation, with terror" that he too is an illusion, and that someone else is dreaming him.

== Themes ==
The Circular Ruins deals with themes that recur in Borges's work, particularly idealism and the manifestation of thoughts in the "real world".

The story draws on a wide range of religious influences. Several critics have observed that the story appears to echo the idea from the Christian Gnostic tradition that, in the words of scholar David C. Howard, "behind every creator lurks another creator." According to Borges scholar Mac Williams, the main character of the dreamer explicitly uses the language of Zoroastrianism, in which fire is considered the purest element. Scholars have also noted the story's similarity to the kabbalistic Jewish legend of the golem, in which mortal men are able to recreate the moment of the divine creation of life. Finally, it also may draw on the Buddhist idea that the world is an illusion.

The story's epigraph is taken from Chapter 4 of Through the Looking-Glass by Lewis Carroll: "And if he left off dreaming about you ...". It comes from the passage in which Tweedledee points out the sleeping Red King to Alice, and claims she is simply a character in his dream. For the story's theme that life may only be a dream or illusion, critics have noted antecedents including Plato's Timaeus (c. 360 BCE), William Shakespeare's The Tempest (c. 1610), Pedro Calderón de la Barca's La vida es sueño (1635), Mark Twain's The Mysterious Stranger (1908), and John Fowles's The Magus (1965).

Borges scholar Arnold M. Penuel describes the story as a "creation myth which paradoxically demythologizes human creativity", comparing it to the way in which Miguel de Cervantes's Don Quixote is a chivalric romance that also demythologizes the chivalric tradition. Though the story's dreamer believes he is creating another man in a supreme act of self-assertion, the experience paradoxically leads him to realize he is himself a dream, shattering his sense of identity. Furthermore, though the story initially appears to implicitly endorse Platonic or Berkeleyan idealism—the notion of a world of ideal forms that transcends the immediately perceptible world—it ironically undercuts this philosophy by showing that the world, too, is an unstable dream.

== Influence ==
"The Circular Ruins" has become one of Borges's best-known stories. Critic David C. Howard argues that Colombian novelist Gabriel García Márquez was influenced by this story and other works by Borges in the writing of his 1967 novel One Hundred Years of Solitude (Cien años de soledad), in which several characters are able to dream people or events into existence. The story has also been cited as a forerunner of the reality-bending work of science fiction author Philip K. Dick. Along with another Borges story, "The Secret Miracle", "The Circular Ruins" was an influence on the Christopher Nolan science fiction film Inception, in which characters move between reality, dreams, and dreams-within-dreams. In their book Gender Trouble, gender studies philosopher Judith Butler uses the story as an allegory for how gender is socially constructed. In another of Borges's stories, "An Examination of the Work of Herbert Quain", Borges jokingly states that he derived "The Circular Ruins" from the work of the fictional author Herbert Quain.

== See also ==
- Lucid dream
- Tulpa

== Bibliography ==
- Borges, Jorge Luis (1962). Labyrinths: Selected Stories & Other Writings. Translated by Irby, James E. New York: New Directions.
- Carroll, Lewis (2010). Through the Looking-Glass. New York: Cosimo.
