= Historia de la eternidad =

Book by Jorge Luis Borges

- First edition
- Author: Jorge Luis Borges
- Language: Spanish
- Genre: Essay
- Published: 1936, Viau y Zona (Buenos Aires)
- Publication place: Argentina
- Pages: 121
- OCLC: 435372797

Historia de la eternidad (in English: A History of Eternity) is a book of essays published by Argentine author Jorge Luis Borges, in 1936 (editio princeps).

== Content ==
In the essay after which the book is titled, which is complemented by two others (La doctrina de los ciclos, in English: Cycles' doctrine, and El tiempo circular, in English: Circular time), the author contemplates the issues of time and eternity, from platonic, Christian and Nietzschean perspectives. As Borges himself states in the book's prologue, eternity

is a splendid artifice that liberates us, even if for just a few moments, from the unbearable oppression of the passage of time.

In the essays titled Los Kenningar (in English: The Kenningars) and La metáfora (in English: Metaphor), Borges analyzes that poetic resource, particularly from the point of view of the ancient Germanic epics. By comparing metaphors present in the ancient Icelandic sagas with later ones, we can observe how the same ones are repeated from one culture to another:

I see something like a reductio ad absurdum in any effort to elaborate new metaphors. Lugones and Baudelaire, I have suspected, have not faced any less failure than the courtier poets of Iceland.

In Los traductores de Las Mil y Una Noches (in English: The translators of One Thousand and One Nights) the author discusses the different old versions of the celebrated collection of oriental stories.

The book is completed by one of the Borges' most noted essay-stories, which also appears in his acclaimed Ficciones: El acercamiento a Almotásim (in English: The Approach to Al-Mu'tasim), and a short and tasteful review of satiric literature and classical insults (El arte de injuriar, in English: The Art of Insulting).

== Essays ==
- Historia de la eternidad (A history of eternity)
- Las kenningar (The Kenningars)
- La metáfora (Metaphor)
- La doctrina de los ciclos (Cycles' doctrine)
- El tiempo circular (Circular time)
- Los traductores de las mil y una noches (The translators of One Thousand and One Nights):

- El capitán Burton (Captain Burton)
- El doctor Mardrus (Doctor Mardrus)l
- Enno Littmann

- Two Notes:

- El acercamiento a Almotásim (The Approach to Al-Mu'tasim) (short story)
- El arte de injuriar (The art of insulting)

== See also ==
- Eternity
- Eternalism
