= Distant Star =

1996 novel by Roberto Bolaño

- First edition (Spanish)
- Author: Roberto Bolaño
- Original title: Estrella distante
- Translator: Chris Andrews
- Language: Spanish
- Publisher: Anagrama (Spanish); New Directions (English)
- Publication date: 1996
- Publication place: Spain
- English publication date: 2004
- Media type: Print (Paperback)
- Pages: 157
- ISBN: 8433910426

Distant Star (Spanish: Estrella distante) is a novella by Chilean author Roberto Bolaño, first published in Spanish in 1996. Chris Andrews’s English translation was published by Harvill Press/ New Directions in 2004. The story is based on "The Infamous Ramírez Hoffman", the last chapter of Bolaño's book of imaginary history of Nazi Literature in the Americas in which the protagonist's name is Carlos Ramírez Hoffman.

== Plot summary ==
The book is narrated from a distance by Arturo B. (probably Arturo Belano, Bolaño's frequent stand-in) and tells the story of Alberto Ruiz-Tagle, an aviator who exploits the 1973 Chilean coup d'état to launch his own version of the New Chilean Poetry: a multi-media enterprise involving sky-writing, torture, photography, murder, and verse.

The narrator first encounters Ruiz-Tagle in a college poetry workshop led by Juan Stein, where Ruiz-Tagle presents himself as a well-dressed, financially secure, self-taught writer with an unnaturally cool, distant, and calculated demeanor — in sharp contrast to the economically poor, messy, leftist, activist tendencies of the narrator (and most other poetry fans then enrolled at the University of Concepcion). Ruiz-Tagle also shows a surprising detachment from his own work, giving measured, intelligent criticism and receiving it without flinching. Ruiz-Tagle also shows a disquieting lack of interest in having more than superficial social relationships with most of his fellow aspiring poets. Ruiz-Tagle’s most stable connection is with the beautiful Garmendia twins, Veronica and Angelica. While most of the young men in the twins’ social circle pine after them to one degree or another, the sisters only have eyes for Ruiz-Tagle.

As the novel progresses it becomes clear that Ruiz-Tagle is far more and far less than a mere poet, through progressively darker and ironic twists and turns.

The next sighting comes as the narrator stands in a prison camp for political undesirables, gazing up at a World War II Messerschmitt skywriting over the Andes. The aviator is none other than Ruiz-Tagle, now serving in the Chilean air force under his actual name, Carlos Wieder, and writing nationalist slogans in the sky. The narrator becomes obsessed with Ruiz-Tagle, suspecting that he is behind every evil act in Pinochet’s regime.

After his release from political prison, the narrator struggles to survive and make sense of his situation. His destiny is eventually reconnected with that of Ruiz-Tagle/Wieder when a Chilean private detective seeks his help in tracking Wieder down by trying to identify the air force pilot's hand behind various articles printed in neo-fascist publications.

== "The Infamous Ramírez Hoffman" ==
As stated in its introduction, Distant Star is an expansion of the final chapter of Bolaño's later work, Nazi Literature in the Americas, an encyclopedic novel composed of short biographies of imaginary Pan-American authors on the political right. The section, entitled "The Infamous Ramírez Hoffman", is the longest in the novel and is markedly different from the other sections of the book, taking on a less encyclopedic and more personal tone. In the expansion of the text, some of the characters' names remained unchanged (e.g. the narrator's fellow prisoner Norberto and the detective Abel Ramirez) but for most of the main characters, the names were altered:

Character	Distant Star	"The Infamous Ramírez Hoffman"
Protagonist	Carlos Wieder/Alberto Ruiz-Tagle	Ramírez Hoffman/Emilio Stevens
Narrator	Arturo B.	Bolaño
Twin Sisters	Veronica and Angelica Garmendia	María and Magdalena Venegas

In spite of the differences between the texts, Bolaño places them within the same fictional world, claiming that the story was narrated to him by Arturo B. in Nazi Literature in the Americas, but Arturo was displeased with the outcome:

"So we took that final chapter and shut ourselves up for a month and a half in my house in Blanes, where, guided by his dreams and nightmares, we composed the present novel. My role was limited to preparing refreshments, consulting a few books, and discussing the reuse of numerous paragraphs with Arturo and the increasingly animated ghost of Pierre Menard."

== Critical reception ==
Nick Caistor, for The Guardian, said, of the book's historical backdrop of "evil", namely its origination from Nazi Literature in the Americas, lends a strange feeling to the novel: "This sense of unease means that Bolaño's narrative style is fragmented and loaded. It is also full of a strange kind of gallows humour, as we are swept along by stories that are invented and presented entirely convincingly, only to be suddenly brought up short by a reminder that this has not been done innocently. Baudelaire warned us long ago that reader and author are linked together in their complicity: if anyone kicks away the stone from Bolaño, he emerges fighting into the daylight."

Glen Helfand, in SFGate, said that the novel's characters, who exist in a "specific literary milieu", may be hard to follow, especially with Bolaño's imagined combinations of fact and fiction: "In their brief appearances, these Chileans embody themes of disappearance, loss, murder, exile and occasionally personal triumph. As colorful as these characters may be, the book is ultimately a dour picaresque, one tempered by ubiquitous references to obscure (perhaps fictional) European and South American poets and the unknowable character at its core."
