= The End (story) =

Short story by Jorge Luis Borges

- Short story by Jorge Luis Borges
- Original title: El fin
- Country: Argentina
- Language: Spanish
- Genre: Short story

Publication
- Published in: Ficciones (2nd ed)
- Media type: Print
- Publication date: 1953
- Published in English: 1962

"The End" (original Spanish title: "El fin") is a short story by Argentine writer Jorge Luis Borges, first published in La Nación in 1953. It was included in the 1956 edition of Ficciones, part two (Artifices).

== Plot summary ==
"The End" is a response to the Argentine epic Martín Fierro, which Borges had discussed in a long essay published earlier that year. In the story, a man who presumably has had a crippling stroke winds up half seeing and half hearing a definitive fight between a "negro" guitarist who has been dwelling in the man's store and a mysterious stranger who turns out to be Martin Fierro, whom the negro has been waiting for. The story ends with Fierro's death at the hands of the negro. Literary scholars have debated the question whether Fierro is a Christ-like figure.
