= Three Versions of Judas =

Short story by Jorge Luis Borges

- Short story by Jorge Luis Borges
- Original title: Tres versiones de Judas
- Country: Argentina
- Language: Spanish
- Genres: Fantasy, short story

Publication
- Published in: Sur
- Media type: Print
- Publication date: August 1944

"Three Versions of Judas" (original Spanish title: "Tres versiones de Judas") is a short story by Argentine writer and poet Jorge Luis Borges. It was included in Borges' anthology Ficciones, published in 1944. Like several other Borges stories, it is written in the form of a scholarly article. The story carries three footnotes and quotes many people, some of which are real (like Antônio Conselheiro), some have been concocted from real life (like Maurice Abramowicz, who was once his classmate, and later became a deputy for the Swiss communist party, but is made a French religious philosopher in the story) and some are completely fictitious (like Jaromir Hladík, who is a character from his own story "The Secret Miracle").

== Plot summary ==
The story begins as a critical analysis of works of a fictitious writer Nils Runeberg. Nils Runeberg lives in the city of Lund, where he publishes two books: Kristus och Judas (1904) [Christ and Judas] and his magnum opus Den hemlige Frälsaren (1909) [The secret Savior]. Borges analyses these two works (three if the revised edition of Kristus och Judas is counted separately) and discusses their heretical conclusions without providing the "dialectic or his (Nils Runeberg) proofs". The story ends with the death of Nils Runeberg.

== The three versions of Judas ==
Borges' fictitious writer Nils Runeberg presents to the world three versions of Judas Iscariot using his two books.

- In the first version of Kristus och Judas, Runeberg says that it was Judas who was the reflection of Jesus in the human world, and as Jesus was our savior sent from heaven, Judas took up the onus of being the human who led Jesus down the path of redemption.
- Amid extreme criticism in the story, Runeberg is forced to rewrite his book. In the second revision of Kristus och Judas, Nils changes his arguments and claims that Judas sacrificed the most. In Borges' own words, "The ascetic, for the greater glory of God, degrades and mortifies the flesh; Judas did the same with the spirit. He renounced honour, good, peace, the Kingdom of Heaven, as others, less heroically, renounced pleasure [ . . . ] He thought that happiness, like good, is a divine attribute and not to be usurped by men."
- In his final book, Den hemlige Frälsaren, Runeberg comes up with the argument that as God in human shape would be "made totally man, but man to the point of iniquity", committing a sin would also not be beyond Him. More important, Runeberg states that a sacrifice limited to only one afternoon on the cross does not compare with the sacrifice of accepting shame and revulsion for the rest of history. Thereby, Runeberg concludes finally that He chose Judas as his incarnation. "God became a man completely, a man to the point of infamy, a man to the point of being reprehensible—all the way to the abyss. In order to save us, He could have chosen any of the destinies which together weave the uncertain web of history; He could have been Alexander, or Pythagoras, or Rurik, or Jesus; He chose an infamous destiny: He was Judas."

== See also ==
- Gospel of Judas — ancient Gnostic text that presents Judas as following Jesus's instructions and the only one Jesus entrusted with his message
- Léon Bloy — in the foreword to his short story collection Artifices, Borges mentions Bloy as one of seven authors who were in "the heterogeneous list of the writers I am continually re-reading. In the christological fantasy titled "Three Versions of Judas" I think I perceive the remote influence of the last (Bloy)"

== Sources ==
- Borges, Jorge Luis. Three Versions of Judas.
