= Droctulf =

Byzantine general

Droctulf (Droctulfus, Droctulfo, Drocton) was a Byzantine general of Suevic or Alemannic origin. According to Paul the Deacon's Historia Langobardorum, he was raised among the Lombards, with whom he entered the Italian Peninsula in 569. He eventually joined the Byzantine army to fight against them, becoming an important ally of both Emperor and Pope.

After Faroald, the Lombard duke of Spoleto, captured Classis, the port of Ravenna, Droctulf recaptured it for the Empire in 575–76. He was briefly imprisoned (Paul refers to a captivitas), but was released to the Empire and served as the commander (dux, duke) of the Byzantine post of Brescello (Reggio nell'Emilia), which guarded a bridge over the river Po leading to Classis, from around 584. Between 584 and 590, he warred extensively against Authari, king of the Lombards, who eventually forced him to retreat to Ravenna while the region of Brescello was taken by the Lombards and the walls of the city razed to the ground.

After his failure in Italy, Droctulf was called to the Balkans and Thrace to fend off the army of Slavs and Avars then besieging Adrianople (586). The Byzantines granted him burial in the Basilica of San Vitale in Ravenna, where his lengthy epitaph survived to be recorded by Paul.

== In literature ==
Droctulft is an idealized protagonist in Jorge Luis Borges' ′Historia del guerrero y de la cautiva′ (Story of the Warrior and the Captive) in the short story collection ′El Aleph′ (′The Aleph′), 1949.

Italian philosopher and literary critic Benedetto Croce referred to Droctulft's (lost) epitaph in Ravenna as ′poetry raising its head where you'd least expect it′ (′La poesia′, 1942).

== Sources ==
- Paul the Deacon. Historia Langobardorum Liber III.
- Theophylact Simocatta. Historiae
- S. Gasparri. "Droctulfo". Dizionario Biografico degli Italiani.
