= Story of the Warrior and the Captive =

Short story by Jorge Luis Borges

- Short story by Jorge Luis Borges
- Original title: Historia del Guerrero y la Cautiva
- Country: Argentina
- Language: Spanish
- Genre: short story

Publication
- Published in: El Aleph
- Media type: Print
- Publication date: 1949

"Story of the Warrior and the Captive" (original Spanish "Historia del Guerrero y la cautiva") is a short story by Argentine writer Jorge Luis Borges. It first appeared in 1949 in the short story collection El Aleph and later appeared in Labyrinths.

== Plot summary ==
The story compares two figures who eschewed their culture in favor of a foreign culture. The narrator first tells the story of Droctulft, a barbarian who, according to the historical writings of Paul the Deacon, abandoned the barbarian Lombards to join the Byzantine Army and defend the city of Ravenna.

The narrator then identifies himself as Borges (one of Borges's many forays into metafiction), and recounts a story that his grandmother had told him. He tells how his grandmother, an Englishwoman living in Buenos Aires in 1872, was introduced to another Englishwoman who, fifteen years earlier, had been taken captive by an indigenous tribe and wed to the chieftain. Borges's grandmother offers to protect her and retrieve her children, but the woman responds that she is happy with the natives and wishes to remain with them. Like Droctulft, she chose to leave the culture she was born into in favor of one completely alien to her.

== See also ==
- Bibliography of Jorge Luis Borges
