= Loving Che =

2003 novel

Loving Che is a novel by Cuban-American author, Ana Menéndez.

The novel is set in two locations: Miami, Florida, and Havana, Cuba. While most of the novel is set in modern times, one character spends a section of the novel reflecting on her life when she was living in Havana, Cuba immediately before and after Fidel Castro's Revolution of Cuba in 1959.

Loving Che centers on the experience of displaced Cuban-Americans and their search to learn about their past and shape an identity. The central character, an unnamed female, feels displaced and without a strong sense of identity and individuality. Throughout the story, she raises the courage to undertake a journey to uncover details about her heritage.

== Plot summary ==
Loving Che centers on the lives of an unnamed female protagonist who is searching for her mother, and Teresa de la Landre, who claims to be her mother. Broken into three distinct parts, the novel begins with the female protagonist, moves into a commentary by Teresa de la Landre, and closes with the female protagonist. Not long after Fidel Castro's successful Cuban Revolution in 1959, the protagonist's grandfather takes his infant granddaughter to America, at the request of his daughter (the protagonist's mother). Growing up in Miami, the protagonist knows little about her parentage or about Cuba. After years of silence and numerous unanswered questions, the protagonist confronts her grandfather about her heritage, particularly pressing him for details about her mother. Talking about his daughter (the protagonist's mother) for the first time, he reveals she wanted her daughter out of Cuba and promised she would reunite with them six months later. Although the grandfather claims he did not want to separate his daughter from her only child, he obliged.

The grandfather recalls that it was only after he had safely arrived in Miami with his granddaughter that he found his daughter's farewell note pinned to his granddaughter's sweater. Unable to return to his homeland because of the political unrest between America and Cuba, the grandfather revealed he tried to contact his daughter, but all his attempts failed. Although the protagonist now has some idea about her heritage, she still feels somewhat lost, drops out of the university, and starts traveling the world.

While traveling the world, the protagonist learns of her grandfather's death and returns to America. Realizing the passing of time is reducing her chances of locating her mother, the protagonist travels to Cuba with her mother's farewell note. Unable to locate her mother, the protagonist returns to Miami, starts a career as a travel writer and tries to forget her past.

When a mysterious package arrives from Spain, the protagonist's interest in her heritage resurges. The package, filled with photographs and letters, is from a woman named Teresa de la Landre, who claims to be her mother. The contents of the package are the subject of the second section of Loving Che in which the protagonist sifts through the contents seeking to uncover details of her heritage. Somewhat skeptical of the letters at first, the protagonist reads about Teresa's life, her career as a painter, and her marriage to Calixto de la Landre. Within her letters, Teresa also states she had an affair with the revolutionary Ernesto “Che” Guevara and claims the protagonist is the result of their affair.

The possible connection between the protagonist and Guevara is important to the novel because of his mythical status throughout the world, especially Cuban culture. Guevara played a significant part in helping Castro seize control of Cuba, and his desire to help the poor and oppressed throughout the world work together to overthrow imperialist governments in order to live free of capitalistic ideals, further built his legendary status. Realizing that being an illegitimate daughter of such an idealized person could have wide-ranging implications for the protagonist prompts her to uncover more details about her past.

In the third section of the book the protagonist seeks authentication of Teresa's story, particularly Teresa's claim that she had an affair with Guevara and the likelihood that she is the product of their affair. The protagonist contacts Dr. Caraballo, a professor of history, and Jacinto Alcazar, a photographer who knew Fidel Castro and Che Guevara briefly. With neither believing the likelihood of Guevara and Teresa's affair, the protagonist travels to Cuba. This time, the protagonist seeks to verify Teresa's story along with trying to locate her mother.

During this later trip to Cuba, the protagonist gains a better understanding of herself by connecting with her country of birth. Although she does not find her mother – a Cuban local claims that her mother is dead – nor does she find out if Teresa and Guevara were her parents, the protagonist no longer appears to feel displaced from her heritage. Previously, when she had visited Cuba the protagonist felt detached, like a tourist. On this latest trip, however, she sees the city with fresh, more favorable eyes and refers to herself as Cuban. Having this connection with all things Cuban, the protagonist also sees Guevara in a new light. Having little knowledge of Guevara prior to receiving Teresa's letters, the protagonist reads many books about him and now feels like he is less foreign to her. Seeing a picture of Guevara in a Manhattan store, the protagonist reflects on what might have been: “a beautiful stranger, who in a different dream, might have been the father of my heart” (226).

== Significant characters ==
Because of the uncertainty of the names of people and places, the novel is ambiguous in parts. Menéndez purposely recreates this ambiguity in order to highlight the circumstances many exiled Cuban-Americans face as they try to uncover details of their past.

- Unnamed female protagonist: Exiled Cuban-American who came to America as a baby

following the Cuban Revolution in 1959. She lives in Miami, is a free-lance travel writer, and seeks knowledge of her heritage.

- Teresa de la Landre: Possibly the female protagonist's mother, a painter, married to

Calixto. She claims to have had an affair with Ernesto “Che” Guevara and the unnamed protagonist is the result.

== Other important characters ==
- Unnamed Cuban grandfather: Exiled Cuban-American, grandfather of unnamed female

protagonist. He brings his granddaughter safely to Miami, Florida following the Cuban Revolution in 1959.

- Dr. Caraballo: Professor of Cuban history at the University of Miami. She analyzes Teresa's

letters and deems them fake.

- Jacinto Alcazar: Onetime photographer of Che Guevara and Fidel Castro. He believes a

relationship between Guevara and Teresa is unlikely.

== Themes ==
Three major themes in the novel are:

1. Search for identity: Like many Cuban-Americans living in exile, the unnamed female protagonist seeks knowledge of her past in order to formulate her own identity. Displaced by Castro's insurgence in 1959 and the resulting changes to Cuba's political and social landscape, many Cubans like the protagonist, fled the country. Also, like many Cuban-Americans, the protagonist's family was torn apart, and this left her feeling displaced from her family and her culture. Furthermore, without a strong sense of connection with her heritage, the protagonist has found it hard to adjust to the American way of life. Of particular concern for the protagonist is the reliability of memory and how it inhibits her desire to locate her mother and/or verify Teresa's claim that she and Guevara are her parents.
2. The role of memory: The trouble the protagonist has locating information about her mother and/or verifying Teresa's letters reveals the complexity of memory. When the protagonist confronts her grandfather about her mother, he tries to remember the incidents surrounding their exile from Cuba over twenty years earlier. However, because of his age and the length of time that has passed, he produces disjointed recollections. While he does produce an unsigned note that he claims the protagonist's mother wrote to her over twenty years earlier, the lack of other supplementary evidence from the past does little to fill the ‘gaps’ in his disjointed story. When the package containing letters and photographs from Teresa de la Landre arrives from Spain, the role of memory is evident once again. Written over twenty years after the protagonist was born, Teresa's memories of the events surrounding the time (she claims) the protagonist was born are at times sporadic. Possibly to make up for some of the ‘gaps’ in her memory, or perhaps as a persuasive device, Teresa includes countless photos of Che Guevara (the man she claims is the protagonist's father). Although the photos of Guevara help fill many of the memory ‘gaps’ in Teresa's story, without substantiating many dates, times, and locations, the protagonist is unable to ‘officially’ verify Teresa's story.
3. Mothering: Two types of mothering relationships are evident in Loving Che: the mother-daughter relationship and Cuba as motherland. Although Teresa does not have a typical mother-daughter relationship with her daughter, Teresa's letters reveal the type of relationship she wishes she could have had. By communicating with her daughter for the first time in over twenty years, Teresa is clearly trying to connect with her daughter. Likewise, the protagonist's renewed search to verify Teresa's letters and possibly locate her mother highlights her desire to connect with her mother. Although the protagonist never officially announces Teresa is her mother, she does let her feelings towards her slip near the end of the novel before quickly returning to call Teresa by her name. Near the end of the novel, the protagonist says, “I hoped to forget the strange packet of memories my mother bequeathed to me” (220). Because the only ‘official’ thing the protagonist received from her mother (via her grandfather) was the note pinned to her sweater twenty years earlier, it is clear that the protagonist is referring to the package Teresa sent. Cuba as motherland is another mothering relationship that occurs within the novel. Like many exiled Cuban-Americans, the protagonist's loss of homeland or motherland has been significant. While she does not locate her mother or ‘officially’ verify Teresa's story, the many trips the protagonist makes to Cuba helps her establish a connection with her country of birth. Only seeing the country as a “sad state” in the past, the protagonist now sees it with new, “amazed” eyes (181). This reassessment of the country highlights the protagonist's willingness to accept her country of birth. When someone in Cuba asks the protagonist if she is British, she immediately connects with her country by announcing she is “Cuban” (185). Connecting with her motherland, and in part, connecting with Teresa, the protagonist no longer sees Guevara as such a strange, distant man. Instead, when she sees a photo of Guevara in a Manhattan store, the protagonist can understand why Cubans, including Teresa, would love such a man. Reflecting her new view of Guevara she states, “a beautiful stranger, who in a different dream, might have been the father of my heart” (226).

== Works cited ==
Menéndez, Ana. Loving Che. New York: Atlantic Monthly Press, 2003.

== See also ==
- Dalleo, Raphael, and Elena Machado Sáez. "New Directions: The Post-Sixties Miami Imaginary." The Latino/a Canon and the Emergence of Post-Sixties Literature. New York: Palgrave Macmillan, 2007. 159–176. https://web.archive.org/web/20131029193238/http://www.post-sixties.com/.
- Socolovsky, Maya. "Cuba Interrupted: The Loss of Center and Story in Ana Menéndez's Collection In Cuba I Was a German Shepherd." Critique: Studies in Contemporary Fiction 46.3 (2005): 235–51.
- Johannessen, Len. "The Lonely Figure: Memory of Exile in Ana Menéndez's 'In Cuba I Was a German Shepherd'." Journal of Postcolonial Writing 41.1 (2005): 54–68.
- Kandiyoti, Dalia. "Consuming Nostalgia: Nostalgia and the Marketplace in Cristina García and Ana Menéndez." MELUS: The Journal of the Society for the Study of the Multi-Ethnic Literature of the United States 31.1 (2006): 81–97.
- NPR Review of Loving Che.https://www.npr.org/2004/02/23/1693355/novel-loving-che-tells-familys-story.
- New York Times Review of Loving Che. https://www.nytimes.com/2004/02/08/books/sleepless-in-miami.html.
