= An Examination of the Work of Herbert Quain =

Short story by Jorge Luis Borges

- Short story by Jorge Luis Borges
- Original title: Examen de la obra de Herbert Quain
- Translator: Anthony Bonner
- Country: Argentina
- Language: Spanish
- Genre: Metafictional short story

Publication
- Published in: Sur
- Media type: Print
- Publication date: April 1941
- Published in English: 1962

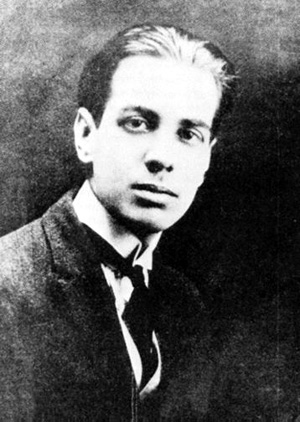
Jorge Luis Borges, 1921

"An Examination of the Work of Herbert Quain" (original Spanish title: "Examen de la obra de Herbert Quain") is a 1941 short story by Argentine writer Jorge Luis Borges. It was included in the anthology Ficciones, part one (The Garden of Forking Paths). The title has also been translated as A Survey of the Works of Herbert Quain.

== Plot summary ==
"An Examination of the Work of Herbert Quain" is a fictional essay surveying the following works, written by fictional deceased Irish author Herbert Quain:

- The God of the Labyrinth (1933), a detective story in which the solution given is wrong, although this fact is not immediately obvious
- April March (1936), a novel with nine different beginnings, trifurcating backwards in time
- The Secret Mirror, a play in which the first act is the work of one of the characters in the second act (à la The Waltz Invention)
- Statements (1939), eight stories which are deliberately calculated to disappoint the reader; The Circular Ruins is supposedly an extract from the third story, "The Rose of Yesterday"

== Style ==
The review of fictional books is a favorite device of Borges (see, for instance, his "pseudo-essay" "The Approach to Al-Mu'tasim" in Ficciones).

The fictional essayist's vanity, affectation, and hypocrisy "gives the story a satirical coloration" and, along with the reactions of the misunderstanding and unappreciative public, serve to, by contrast, emphasize Quain's "uncompromising purity."

== Influence ==
In his 1984 novel The Year of the Death of Ricardo Reis (Original Portuguese title O ano da morte de Ricardo Reis), José Saramago's protagonist, Ricardo Reis, spends much time considering the work The God of the Labyrinth by Herbert Quain.

The fictional anthologist who curates Ana Menendez's Adios, Happy Homeland! (2011) is named Herberto Quain. He describes himself as coming from Roscommon in Ireland, and moving to Havana later in life, at which time he added the "o" to the end of his name.

Colin Wilson published a novel titled The God of the Labyrinth (1970) in reference to Borges.

In Karim Alwari's Book of Sands (2015) Tarek's pregnant wife reads April March by Herbert Quain.

Portuguese musician Manuel Bogalheiro chose his stage name (Mr. Herbert Quain) because he liked the way the name sounded.

The fictional book The Heart of Agent 9 or The Heart of Observer 9 by Herbert Quain is featured prominently in the Space Battleship Yamato 2199 episode Clockwork Prisoner.
