= The Form of the Sword =

- Short story by Jorge Luis Borges
- Original title: La forma de la espada
- Translator: Harriet de Onís
- Country: Argentina
- Language: Spanish

Publication
- Published in: Ficciones
- Publisher: Editorial Sur
- Media type: Print
- Publication date: 1942
- Published in English: 1953

"The Form of the Sword" (original Spanish title: "La forma de la espada", sometimes translated as "The Shape of the Sword") is a short story by Argentine author Jorge Luis Borges, first published in July 1942 in La Nación, and included in the 1944 collection Ficciones, part two (Artifices). The first English translation appeared in New World Writing No. 4, in 1953. In the story, an Irishman, now living near Tacuarembó in Uruguay, recounts his experiences in the Irish War of Independence and how he received the large scar on his face.

== Synopsis ==
Borges starts the story narrating as himself as he is forced to stop in a small town run by the unnamed Irishman, who is known as strict but fair. Borges ingratiates himself with the Irishman, and they go out to drink together on the patio. Borges gets drunk and asks about the origin of a crescent-shaped scar on the Irishman's face. His story is as follows:

The Irishman describes the war and the introduction of a new comrade, John Vincent Moon, into their band of rebels. Moon, who "couldn't have been more than twenty," was a student of Communism with a dogmatic style of argumentation; in academic fashion he "reduced the history of the world to one sordid economic conflict." The narrator describes how he himself saved Moon's life when soldiers attacked them. A bullet scraped Moon in the shoulder as they escaped. The narrator and Moon returned to the narrator's hideout in a general's house, where he found that Moon's wound was only superficial. At this point the narrator realized that Moon was a hopeless coward.

The pair stayed in the general's house for ten days. On the ninth day, the narrator went out to avenge the death of some comrades. Moon stayed at the house, pleading his injury. When the narrator returned, he heard Moon on the telephone, selling him out to the police. The narrator recounts how he chased Moon through the house, cornered him, and marked a moon-shaped scar on Moon's forehead just before the police captured him.

At this point, Borges interrupts the story to ask what happened to Moon. The Irishman tells Borges he only is telling him the rest of this story because he is a stranger; the disdain of a stranger will not hurt so much. Then he proceeds to tell that Moon fled with "his Judas silver"; the narrator, that evening, "saw a dummy shot by a firing squad of drunks."

The Irishman ends his tale thus: "I have told you the story this way so that you would hear it out. It was I who betrayed the man who saved me: it is I who am Vincent Moon. Now, despise me."
