= Diego Vega =

Colombian-American composer

Diego David Vega
- Born: 1968 (age 57–58); Bogotá, Colombia
- Occupations: Composer and music professor
- Website: diegovega.com

Diego David Vega (born 1968) is a Colombian-American composer and music professor whose work blends elements of traditional Colombian music with contemporary styles. He has created works for a variety of ensembles, including soloists, chamber groups, and symphony orchestras. Vega is also an experienced music educator, having taught composition and theory in both Colombia and the United States. He became an associate professor at the University of Nevada, Las Vegas School of Music in 2011, and has received commissions from institutions such as the National Symphony Orchestra of Colombia and Maîtrise Notre Dame de Paris.

== Education and career ==
Vega studied at the Javeriana University in Bogotá, Colombia, where he earned his Bachelor of Music. He also studied at the Cincinnati College-Conservatory of Music in Cincinnati, Ohio, where he earned his Master of Music, and at Cornell University in Ithaca, New York, where he earned his doctorate. Among other teachers, his composition teachers were Guillermo Gaviria, Ricardo Zohn-Muldoon, Joel Hoffman, Roberto Sierra, and Steven Stucky.

He was a visiting assistant professor of composition and theory at the Setnor School of Music (Syracuse University) and an associate professor at Javeriana University before joining UNLV in 2011. He became associate professor in 2016 and full professor in 2024.

Vega is one of five composers for the album Reason & Reverence which was released in June 2018 by Navona Records. The composers are described as having developed "a compelling, philosophical reflection of the world we live in." Petr Vronský conducted, and the Moravian Philharmonic Orchestra delivers the compositions.

== Musical style ==
Diego Vega's musical style is characterized by a synthesis of classical music, Colombian music, jazz, and his favorite composers. He often incorporates elements of Colombian traditional music into his works, such as rhythms, melodies, harmonies, and instruments. He also explores the use of complex textures, polyrhythms, polytonality, and extended techniques. He is influenced by composers from different periods and genres, such as Prokofiev, Debussy, Ravel, Stravinsky, Bartók, Ligeti, Lutoslawski, Messiaen, Stucky, and many others. Latin American writers have inspired some of his works, such as "hlör u fang axaxaxas mlö" (2004) for clarinet, violin, cello and piano, which was influenced by Jorge Luis Borges’ writings, and his recent ballet "Espíritu de Pájaro", which was based on poems by Colombian indigenous authors.

=== Recognition ===
Vega has won several awards for his compositions, including the Colombian National Prize of Music in Composition in 2004, the Ensemble X composition competition in 2004, the Ithaca College Chamber Orchestra Composition Competition in 2010, and the Alea III 20th anniversary prize in 2002. His music has been performed by notable ensembles, including the Norwegian Radio Orchestra, Eighth Blackbird, Youth Orchestra of the Americas, National Symphony Orchestra of Colombia, Bogotá Philharmonic, Soli Chamber Ensemble, and Cuarteto Latinoamericano.

== Compositions ==
=== Works for orchestra ===
- 1992 Sinfonía, for string orchestra
- 1993 Sinfonía en un Movimiento
- 1996 Concierto, for clarinet and orchestra
- 2002 Movimiento, for piano and chamber orchestra
- 2007 Tumbaos, for orchestra
- 2022 Espritu de Pajaro

Espíritu de Pájaro is a contemporary dance performance and symphonic music composition commissioned by the National Symphony Orchestra of Colombia. It is dedicated to the indigenous communities of Colombia. The ballet was inspired by poems written by authors such as Hugo Jamioy from the Kamëntsá people, Fredy Chikangana from the Yanakuna people, and Vito Apüshana from the Wayuu people. It premiered at the Teatro de Cristóbal Colón in Bogotá on November 4 and 5, 2022, with choreography by Álvaro Restrepo and conducted by Juan Felipe Molano.

=== Works for wind band ===
- 1998 Audi Reliqua, for wind band
- 2003 Selección Múltiple para Vientos

=== Masses, cantatas, and sacred music ===
- 1994-1995 Misa de Pentecostés, for mixed choir, children's choir, organ, brass quintet, and timpani
- 1995 Motetes Notre-Dame, for mixed choir

=== Works for choir ===
- 2004 Canticum Novum, for mixed choir

=== Chamber music ===
- 1990 Sonata, for clarinet and piano
- 1991 Suite para Cuarteto de Maderas, for flute, oboe, clarinet, and bassoon
- 1999 De Profundis, for flute, clarinet, violin, cello, piano, and percussion
- 2000 String Quartet
- 2000 Diferencias, for flute, clarinet, violin, cello, piano, and percussion
- 2001 (Di)Ego Dixi, for flute and piano
- 2004 hlör u fang axaxaxas mlö, for clarinet, violin, cello, and piano
- 2006 Nocturno, for viola and piano

=== Works for piano ===
- 1990 Cuatro Piezas para Piano
- 1990 Sonatina

=== Electronic music ===
- 1999 iii..., for computer
- 2000 Este pueblo está lleno de ecos, for computer

== Discography ==
- 2014 — Portraits (New Dynamic Records). SOLI Chamber Ensemble; includes Vega’s Divertimento (chamber).
- 2016 — New South American Discoveries (Harmonia Mundi, HMU 907670). Norwegian Radio Orchestra; Miguel Harth-Bedoya (cond.); includes Música Muisca. Reviewed in the UK press.
- 2017 — La Nueva Música Sinfónica Colombiana, Vol. V (Universidad EAFIT). Orquesta Sinfónica EAFIT; Cecilia Espinosa (cond.); includes Música Muisca. Issued digitally in 2017.
- 2018 — Reason & Reverence: Works for Orchestra (Navona Records, NV6166). Moravian Philharmonic; Petr Vronský (cond.); includes Red Rock. Recording sessions: Reduta Hall, Olomouc, 18–22 Sept 2017 (per retailer listing). Reviewed by Audiophile Audition.
- 2022/2023 — La Ruta (Arcantus Musikproduktion, ARC 22036). Kondraschewa/Chica Piano Duo; includes Rapsodia para dos pianos (2012). Label lists 2022; retailers list CD street date 30 June 2023.
- 2024 — Espíritu de Pájaro (Zero Gravity Sound LLC; Dolby Atmos release). Orquesta Sinfónica Nacional de Colombia; Juan Felipe Molano (cond.). Dolby Atmos format indicated by Tidal; Apple Music lists the U.S. release as 23 April 2024 (℗ 2024 Zero Gravity Sound LLC).

Reception: The Arts Desk praised New South American Discoveries as “a fabulous compilation” with “magnificent” playing, and Audiophile Audition called Reason & Reverence a “refreshingly good listen” and recommended it to “lovers of contemporary music and richly recorded sound.”
