= Ana Menéndez =

American novelist (born 1970)

- Born: 1970 (age 54–55); Los Angeles, California, U.S.
- Occupation: Writer; journalist
- Education: Florida International University (BA)

Website
- anamenendezonline.com

Ana Menéndez (born 1970 in Los Angeles) is an American writer and journalist.

== Early life ==
Menéndez was born to Cuban exile parents who fled to Los Angeles, California in 1964. Menéndez's parents expected to return to Cuba at any time and prepared their children for this eventuality. As a result, Menéndez spoke only Spanish until she enrolled in kindergarten. The family later moved first to Tampa, Florida, and then Miami, Florida, where Menéndez went to high school. Menéndez received her Bachelor of Arts from Florida International University in 1992.

== Career ==
Menéndez spent six years as a journalist in the 1990s. She began at the Miami Herald in 1991, where she covered the Miami neighborhood of Little Havana, and then moved to the Orange County Register in California. After pursuing a literary career for several years, she returned to the Miami Herald in 2005 as a columnist. In 2008, Menéndez took a leave of absence from the Miami Herald to accept a Fulbright grant to teach at the American University in Cairo.

In 1997, Menéndez entered the Creative Writing Program at New York University, where she was a New York Times fellow. Her collection of short stories, In Cuba I Was a German Shepherd, was published shortly after her graduation in 2001. The New York Times named it a Notable Book of The Year and the title story won the Pushcart Prize for short fiction. Menéndez published her first novel, Loving Che, in 2003. Her third book, The Last War, was published by HarperCollins in June 2009. Adios, Happy Homeland! a book of linked, formally experimental short stories was published in 2011.

== See also ==
- List of Cuban American writers
- List of Cuban Americans
