= The Approach to Al-Mu'tasim =

Short story by Jorge Luis Borges

- Short story by Jorge Luis Borges
- Original title: El acercamiento a Almotásim
- Translator: Anthony Bonner
- Country: Argentina
- Language: Spanish
- Genre: Metafictional short story

Publication
- Published in: Historia de la eternidad (1936); Ficciones (1944)
- Media type: Print
- Publication date: 1936
- Published in English: 1962

"The Approach to Al-Mu'tasim" (original Spanish title: "El acercamiento a Almotásim") is a fantasy short story written in 1935 by Argentine writer Jorge Luis Borges. In his autobiographical essay, Borges wrote about "The Approach to Al-Mu'tasim", "it now seems to me to foreshadow and even to set the pattern for those tales that were somehow awaiting me, and upon which my reputation as a storyteller was to be based."

== Background ==
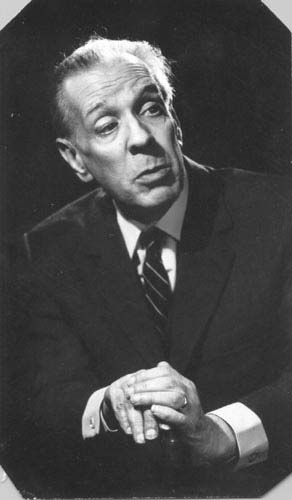
Borges in 1976

Written in 1935, "The Approach to Al-Mu'tasim" was first published as an essay in Borges's 1936 philosophical essay collection A History of Eternity (Historia de la eternidad). It was labeled a short story when it was reprinted in 1942 in Borges's first short fiction collection, The Garden of Forking Paths (El jardín de senderos que se bifurcan), which became a subsection of Ficciones when that was published in 1944.

Borges described his story as "both a hoax and a pseudo-essay." He borrowed from Kipling for some of the plot of the fake book. The supposed publisher of the fictitious book described in the story was an actual publisher, Victor Gollancz, as was the supposed writer of the preface, Dorothy L. Sayers.

== Plot summary ==
The story is a review of The Conversation with the Man Called Al-Mu'tasim: A Game of Shifting Mirrors, the second edition of an earlier work, The Approach to Al-Mu'tasim. Written by Mir Bahadur Ali, an Indian lawyer, and published in 1934. The second edition is described by the narrator as inferior to the first edition, published in 1932.

The reviewer gives a history of the book, first describing the success of the first edition, the publishing of the second edition by a respected publisher in London, and the positive and negative reception given to it by critics. Borges states that though both books have been popular, the first had an original printing of 4,000 copies and was never reprinted, while the second is by far the better known, having been reprinted several times. The second has often been criticized for poor writing and for its obvious allegory to the quest of finding God.

The narrator then summarizes the plot of the novel. The book is a detective story about a freethinking Bombay law student of Islamic background. He becomes involved in a sectarian riot in which he impulsively kills a Hindu, after which he becomes an outcast among the lower classes of India. He flees to a tower where he meets a robber of Parsee corpses collecting gold teeth. He then begins a journey across the subcontinent (the geography of which Borges describes in detail), interacting with untouchables along the way. He meets a man who, though destitute, is happy and spiritual. The student encounters many such people radiating a small amount of this spiritual clarity. From these experiences, he infers the existence of a perfect man, whom he calls Al-Mu'tasim. (Al-Mu'tasim means "he who goes in quest of aid" or "the seeker of shelter".) This perfect man is a higher spiritual being, the source and originator of this pure spiritual clarity. Obsessed with meeting Al-Mu'tasim, the student goes on a pilgrimage through Hindustan to find him. He eventually hears the voice of Al-Mu'tasim resounding from a hut. He pulls back the curtain and goes in. The book ends at this point. The reviewer then presents his criticisms of the work, such as countering the book’s view of a singular god with the idea of an infinite regress of gods, each seeking a superior deity.

A long footnote at the end of the review summarises The Conference of the Birds (1177) by Farid ud-Din Attar, in which a group of birds seek a feather dropped in the middle of China by Simurgh, the bird king. Thirty birds reach the mountain of Simurgh and there they find through contemplation that they themselves are the Simurgh. (Si murgh means "thirty birds".)

== Style ==
Borges's mixing of the fictional and the real, which Jaime Alazraki calls a "Borgesian device," both imparts a real feeling to the fictional, and an unreal feeling to the real. Also, the use of a summary within a summary, and the taking of those summaries and stripping them down to expose the same principle "are a form of expressing in the structure of the story the pantheistic idea that anything is all things."

Naomi Lindstrom describes the reviewer of the detective story as "a typical Borges narrator". At times he demonstrates great knowledge of detailed information, but at other times he cannot grasp the most basic concepts. His narrative is uncertain and inconstant. His confusion serves to emphasize the incomprehension of the main character of the fictitious book as he goes on his pilgrimage.

Borges's use of an allegory to shed light on a detective story shows his use of religious doctrines for aesthetic value.

== Reception ==
In his autobiographical essay, Borges writes that when "The Approach to Al-Mu'tasim" was first published, the people who read it "took it at face value, and one of my friends even ordered a copy from London."

== Legacy ==
Psychedelic rock band Blaak Heat named their 2016 album, Shifting Mirrors, after the subtitle of Bahadur's fictional book mentioned in the short story. The album also contains a track named after The Approach To Al-Mu'Tasim.
