= Theme of the Traitor and the Hero =

- Short story by Jorge Luis Borges
- Original title: Tema del traidor y del héroe
- Country: Argentina
- Language: Spanish
- Genres: Mystery, short story

Publication
- Published in: Sur
- Media type: Print
- Publication date: February 1944

Chronology
—	William

"Theme of the Traitor and the Hero" (original Spanish title: "Tema del traidor y del héroe") is a short story by the Argentine writer Jorge Luis Borges, originally published in 1944 in number 112 of the review Sur.

== Plot ==
For the one hundred year anniversary of the death of Fergus Kilpatrick, an Irish nationalist hero who led a group of Irish plotters, and was assassinated in 1824, a descendant called Ryan is preparing a biography. Kilpatrick was killed in a theatre by unknown assailants, with a letter on his body warning him he faced death after a diviner had predicted his end. Spotting these parallels with Shakespeare's plays, Ryan come across that the oldest of the conspirators, James Nolan, was the translator of Shakespeare into Gaelic. Eventually, Ryan works out that the nationalists knew they had been betrayed to the British authorities and Kilpatrick admitted he was the accuser. After sentencing him to death, Nolan agreed to make his passing a memorable affair in Irish history. So Nolan hastily faked the Shakespearean echoes and out of a sordid plot a hero was born. Ryan continued to leave the myth intact.

== Literary and philosophical references ==
In addition to the plays Julius Caesar and Macbeth, with often heavy irony Borges links his story to many predecessors. Among them are:

- Moses, who preceded Kilpatrick as a leader who saw the promised land of freedom for his people but had to die before it was reached.
- Hesiod, Vico and Spengler, who saw human history not as linear progress but as a spiral of descent.
- Caesar, who saw the British Isles under the grip of obscurantist druids.
- Leibniz, who saw the cosmos as an ultimate harmony.
- Lincoln, who followed Kilpatrick in becoming a national hero murdered in a theatre.
- Browning and Hugo, who in their works celebrated perceived nationalist heroes.
- Chesterton, who like Borges enjoyed creating involuted but symmetrical mysteries.

== Film adaptation ==
In 1970 the story was adapted into an Italian film called Strategia del ragno (The Spider's Stratagem), directed by Bernardo Bertolucci. In this version, the conspirators had planned to blow up the Duce Mussolini in 1936 during a performance of Rigoletto.

== Sources ==
- Borges, Jorge Luis. Theme of the Traitor and the Hero.
- Pugh, Adam. "Order Versus Chaos: Comparing the literary essences of Isaac Asimov and Jorge Luis Borges". Archived from the original on December 29, 2007.
- Allen B. Ruch (21 September 2019). "Borges - Film: The Spider's Strategy".
