= The Sect of the Phoenix =

Short story by Jorge Luis Borges

"The Cult of the Phoenix"
- Short story by Jorge Luis Borges
- Original title: La secta del Fénix
- Translator: Anthony Bonner
- Country: Argentina
- Language: Spanish
- Genres: Fantasy, short story

Publication
- Published in: Ficciones (2nd ed)
- Media type: Print
- Publication date: 1952
- Published in English: 1962

"The Sect of the Phoenix" (original Spanish title: "La secta del Fénix") is a short story by Argentine writer Jorge Luis Borges, first published in Sur in 1952. It was included in the 1956 edition of Ficciones, part two (Artifices). The title has also been translated as "The Cult of the Phoenix."

== Plot summary ==
Borges gives an enigmatic description (or at least, assertion of the existence) of a secret society dating back to ancient times, the members of which "resemble every man in the world" and whose membership consists simply of the performance of a strange ritual.

== Discussion on meaning ==
Essentially the story is an extended riddle, the mysterious description referring to a commonplace fact (as Borges points out in the prologue to Artifices). The probable and common answer is that the riddle refers to sexual intercourse, and Borges himself confessed as much. However, in relation to the debate on Borges' sexual orientation, it is argued by some that the secret Borges had in mind was, more specifically, homosexual intercourse or homosexuality in general; to support this, they point to such clues as "scattered across the face of the earth, […] only one thing—the Secret—unites them and will unite them until the end of time." Against this reading, however, one might observe the story's claim that "the history of the sect records no persecutions", which cannot be true if the 'Secret' is homosexual intercourse. Moreover, the name of the sect associates it with the mythological Phoenix, suggesting regeneration and renewal of life: the more obvious analogy, therefore, would be with procreative (that is, heterosexual) intercourse. It is also referred to in El Aleph, a precursor to this story.
