= The Secret Miracle =

1943 short story by Jorge Luis Borges

- Short story by Jorge Luis Borges
- Original title: El Milagro Secreto
- Translator: Harriet de Onís
- Country: Argentina
- Language: Spanish
- Genres: Historical fiction; magical realism; short story

Publication
- Media type: Print
- Publication date: 1943
- Published in English: 1956

"The Secret Miracle" (Spanish: "El milagro secreto") is a short story by Argentine writer and poet Jorge Luis Borges. The story focuses on an author condemned to death. At the moment of his execution, time freezes, allowing him to finish his masterpiece, though only within his own mind.

The story was first published in the magazine Sur in February 1943 and was collected in Ficciones (1944). The first English translation (by Harriet de Onís) appeared in 1956 in Spanish Stories & Tales, Pocket Books.

== Plot summary ==
A minor Czech author, Jaromir Hladík, is living in Prague when it is occupied by the Nazis in March 1939. Hladík is arrested and charged with being Jewish as well as opposing the Anschluss, and he is sentenced to die by firing squad in one week.

Terrified of his impending execution, Hladík spends most of that week picturing it with infinite variations, until he has "died hundreds of deaths". However, Hladík's main concern soon turns to his unfinished play, The Enemies, the story of a nineteenth-century man caught in a strange, repeating loop of experiences. Hladík wishes to complete his play, which he feels will vindicate his previous mediocre literary output and life's work.

On the last night before his death, he prays to God, asking for one more year of time in which to finish the play. That night, he dreams of going to the Clementinum library, where the librarian has gone blind looking for a single letter that represents God. Someone returns an atlas to the library; Hladík touches a letter in it and hears a voice that says, "The time of your labor has been granted".

The next morning, Hladík is taken outside to the firing squad. The sergeant gives the order to fire, but then time stops. Hladík cannot move, but he remains conscious. After an initial day of panic, he finishes his masterpiece within his own mind. Once The Enemies is complete, time begins again and the volley from the soldiers' rifles kills him.

== Composition and themes ==
"The Secret Miracle" has often been compared to "An Occurrence at Owl Creek Bridge" (1890) by American author Ambrose Bierce, in which a Confederate spy hanged during the American Civil War hallucinates a lengthy escape at the moment of his death. However, it is unknown if Bierce's story was a specific influence on Borges' composition.

In one of the story's best-known lines, Hladik reflects that "irreality" is "one of art's requisites". The line is often cited in discussions of Borges' own explorations of art, artifice, and reality.

Critic Edna Aizenberg has noted that though Borges is often considered an author who focuses on "irreality" rather than social concerns, "The Secret Miracle" is firmly rooted in the Holocaust; Hladík is arrested at the start of the Nazi occupation of Czechoslovakia and sentenced to death in large part for being Jewish. John Fraser reads the story as similarly rooted in historical concerns, arguing that Hladik gives a model of how art can be used to transcend contemporary geopolitical horrors. David Laraway argues that the structure of the story seems to uncannily prefigure new media forms and technologies, including the looped gif and the use of photogrammetric techniques that were used to create the illusion of "bullet-time" in films such as The Matrix.

== Influence ==
American author Nicholson Baker cited "The Secret Miracle" as an influence on his erotic science fiction novel The Fermata.

Along with another Borges story, "The Circular Ruins", "The Secret Miracle" was an influence on the Christopher Nolan science fiction film Inception, in which varying time perception inside and outside dreams plays a major plot role.

== Bibliography ==
- Borges, Jorge Luis (1962). Labyrinths: Selected Stories & Other Writings. Translated by Onis, Harriet. New York: New Directions.
