= Alastair Reid (poet) =

Scottish poet and a scholar of South American literature (1926 – 2014)

Alastair Reid (22 March 1926, in Whithorn – 21 September 2014, in Manhattan) was a Scottish poet and a scholar of South American literature. He was known for his lighthearted style of poems and for his translations of South American poets Jorge Luis Borges and Pablo Neruda. Although he was known for translations, his own poems had gained notice during his lifetime. He had lived in Spain, Switzerland, Greece, Morocco, Argentina, Mexico, Chile, the Dominican Republic, and in the United States. During the editorship of William Shawn he wrote for The New Yorker magazine, but his main income was from teaching.

== Life ==
Reid was born at Whithorn in Galloway, Scotland, the son of a clergyman. During the Second World War he served in the Royal Navy decoding ciphers. After the war he studied Classics at the University of St Andrews and briefly taught Classics at Sarah Lawrence College, New York. In the mid-1950s he travelled to Mallorca, spending some time working as the secretary of Robert Graves.

In 1984, in an interview for The Wall Street Journal, Reid admitted fabricating many details of his reporting from Spain for the New Yorker, including inventing places and ascribing statements to composite characters. He said these lies were an attempt to present "a larger truth, of which facts form a part." In his book, Whereabouts, Reid counters this article with the following:

These pieces were at the center of a curious storm that blew up in the American press during June of 1984. A year or so before, I had addressed a seminar at Yale University on the wavering line between fact and fiction, using examples from various writers, Borges among them, and from my own work. A student from the seminar went on to become a reporter and published a piece in The Wall Street Journal that charged me with having made a practice of distorting facts, quoting the cases I had cited in the seminar. Many newspaper editorials took up the story as though it were fact, and used it to wag pious fingers at the New Yorker. A number of columnists reproved me for writing about an "imaginary" Spanish village, a charge that would have delighted the flesh-and-blood inhabitants.... Not a single one of my critics, as far as I could judge, had gone back to read the pieces in question.

Reid published more than forty books of poems, translations, and travel writing, including Ounce Dice Trice, a book of word-play and literary nonsense for children (illustrated by Ben Shahn), and two selections from his works: Outside In: Selected Prose and Inside Out: Selected Poetry and Translations (both 2008).

During the 1980s and 1990s Reid spent much of his time on a ginger plantation in Samaná, Dominican Republic, until 2003 when tourism boomed in the area.

Reid died on 21 September 2014, aged 88, due to a gastric bleed during treatment for pneumonia. He is survived by his children, Michael Reid Hunter, and Jasper Reid, and his wife Leslie Clark.

== Selected bibliography ==
- To Lighten My House: Poems (1953)
- Ounce, Dice, Trice – with drawings by Ben Shahn (1958)
- Oddments, Inklings, Omens, Moments: Poems (1959)
- Passwords: Place, Poems, Preoccupations (1964)
- Weathering: Poems and Translations (1978)
- Whereabouts: Notes on Being a Foreigner (1990)
- Inside Out: Selected Poetry and Translations (2008)
- Outside In: Selected Prose (2008)
- Barefoot: The Collected Poems (2018)

== Other sources ==
- International Who's Who in Poetry 2004
