= The Garden of Forking Paths =

1941 short story by Jorge Luis Borges

- Short story by Jorge Luis Borges
- Collection first edition
- Original title: El jardín de senderos que se bifurcan
- Translator: Anthony Boucher
- Country: Argentina
- Language: Spanish
- Genres: Weird, fantasy

Publication
- Published in: El Jardín de senderos que se bifurcan (1941); Ficciones (1944)
- Publisher: Editorial Sur
- Media type: Print
- Publication date: 1941
- Published in English: 1948

"The Garden of Forking Paths" (original Spanish title: "El jardín de senderos que se bifurcan") is a 1941 short story by Argentine writer and poet Jorge Luis Borges. It is the title story in the collection El jardín de senderos que se bifurcan (1941), which was republished in its entirety in Ficciones (Fictions) in 1944. It was the first of Borges's works to be translated into English by Anthony Boucher when it appeared in Ellery Queen's Mystery Magazine in August 1948. In 1958 it was translated again into English by Donald A. Yates and published in Michigan Alumnus Quarterly Review, Spring 1958. In 1962 this translation was included in the book Labyrinths (New Directions).

The story's theme has been said to foreshadow the many-worlds interpretation of quantum mechanics. It may have been inspired by work of the philosopher and science fiction author Olaf Stapledon.

Borges's vision of "forking paths" has been cited as inspiration by numerous new media scholars, in particular within the field of hypertext fiction. Other stories by Borges that explore the idea of infinite texts include "The Library of Babel" and "The Book of Sand".

== Plot summary ==
The narrator opens the story by mentioning that in A History of the World War (page 212), Captain Liddell Hart claimed that there was a delay in a British attack on the Serre-Montauban line during World War I, and states that the signed statement of Chinese professor Yu Tsun allows the events to be understood in a new way. The remainder of the story consists of this statement.

Tsun is living in the United Kingdom during the war but acting as a spy for Imperial Germany, motivated not by a love of the latter country, but by a desire to prove to his chief that he is not racially inferior. He has discovered a crucial bit of information, the location of a new British artillery park. However, he also learns that a British intelligence officer of Irish ancestry, Richard Madden, has just killed another member of Tsun's spy ring and will surely catch Tsun within the day. Tsun forms a plan to transmit his information to Germany and flees on a train, narrowly escaping capture by Madden.

Tsun arrives at the village of Ashgrove to seek a man named Stephen Albert. Thinking about labyrinths as he walks, he remembers one of his ancestors, a provincial governor named Ts'ui Pen. Ts'ui Pen had retired from civil service to construct "a novel that would be even more populous than the Hung Lu Meng and a labyrinth in which all men would become lost." However, he was apparently murdered before he could complete either task, leaving only incoherent drafts of the novel and no known labyrinth.

On reaching Albert's house, Tsun is astonished to learn that Albert is a sinologist who is himself studying Ts'ui Pen's incomplete novel. Albert, himself thrilled to meet a descendant of Ts'ui Pen, explains that he believes Ts'ui Pen's novel and labyrinth were not distinct projects, but rather two descriptions of a single project. Albert had acquired a letter by Ts'ui Pen that included the statement, "I leave to several futures (not to all) my garden of forking paths." In Albert's interpretation, these forking paths would represent the various possible futures that could have resulted from each event of the novel, all of which Ts'ui Pen describes in separate chapters, rather than choosing a single outcome for each event. The novel's apparent multiple drafts of various chapters would be in fact a single work, in which the infinitely forking futures are described. The novel is thus "an enormous riddle, or parable, whose theme is time".

Overwhelmed with emotion, Tsun states that by unlocking his ancestor's masterpiece, Albert has surely earned his gratitude in every divergent future. Albert replies with a smile that there is at least one timeline where Tsun is his enemy.

At that moment, Tsun sees Madden running through the house's garden. He asks Albert to turn around on a pretext and shoots him fatally in the back. Madden immediately arrests Tsun, who is convicted of homicide and sentenced to death. In his cell awaiting his hanging, he explains that he successfully transmitted the message that the British artillery was in the town of Albert, Somme by killing a man of that name, and that his German chief understood the significance when he saw the murder in the newspapers. However, Tsun notes that the chief "does not know (no one can know) my endless contrition and weariness."

== In later work and influences ==
- In statistics, the forking paths problem is also known as the "garden of forking paths fallacy" and refers to how making a series of decisions along a large decision tree can lead to a higher false-positive rate in an experiment. Named by statistician Andrew Gelman, this concept references "The Garden of Forking Paths" to describe how scientists can make false discoveries when they do not pre-specify a data analysis plan and instead choose "one analysis for the particular data they saw."
- In 1987, Stuart Moulthrop created a hypertext version of "The Garden of Forking Paths" titled Victory Garden.
- Parallels have been drawn between the concepts in the story and the many-worlds interpretation in physics by Bryce DeWitt in his preface to "The Many World Interpretation of Quantum Mechanics".
- Borges's short stories, specifically "The Garden of Forking Paths," exerted a significant influence on Mark Z. Danielewski's novel House of Leaves. The character Zampanò is something of a Borges figure himself (his blindness, his obsession with infinity, his masterful writing that seems to loop back on itself but never in the same way). Danielewski mentions "The Garden of Forking Paths" in footnote #167 of the novel.
- The Dantean video game Ultrakill directly references Borges' story at the very beginning of Layer 7: Violence: the sub-chapter entitled "The Garden of Forking Paths".
- Gilles Deleuze used the story to illustrate the Leibnizian concept of several impossible worlds simultaneously existing and the problem of future contingents.

== See also ==
- Alternate history
- Choose Your Own Adventure
- Many-minds interpretation
- Many-worlds interpretation
- Multiverse
- Possible worlds
