= María Elena Walsh =

Argentine author and composer

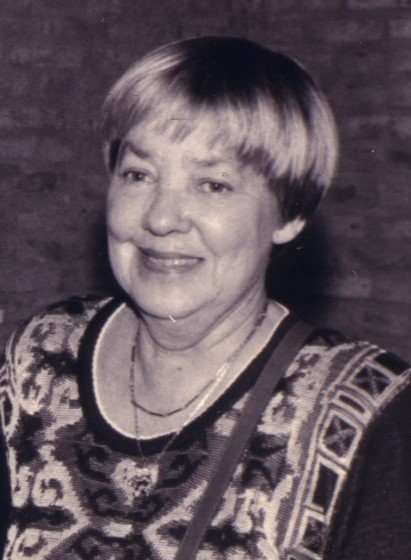
- Walsh in 1995
- Born: 1 February 1930; Ramos Mejía, Argentina
- Died: 10 January 2011 (aged 80); Buenos Aires, Argentina
- Occupations: Poet, author, musician, writer
- Partner: Sara Facio (1978–2011)
- Writing career
- Period: 1945-2008
- Genres: Children's literature, Autobiographical novel, poetry
- Website: https://fundacionwalshfacio.com/

María Elena Walsh (Spanish pronunciation: [maˈɾia eˈlena ˈwalʃ], 1 February 1930 – 10 January 2011) was an Argentine poet, novelist, musician, playwright, writer and composer, mainly known for her songs and books for children. Her work includes many of the most popular children's books and songs of all time in her home country.

== Biography ==
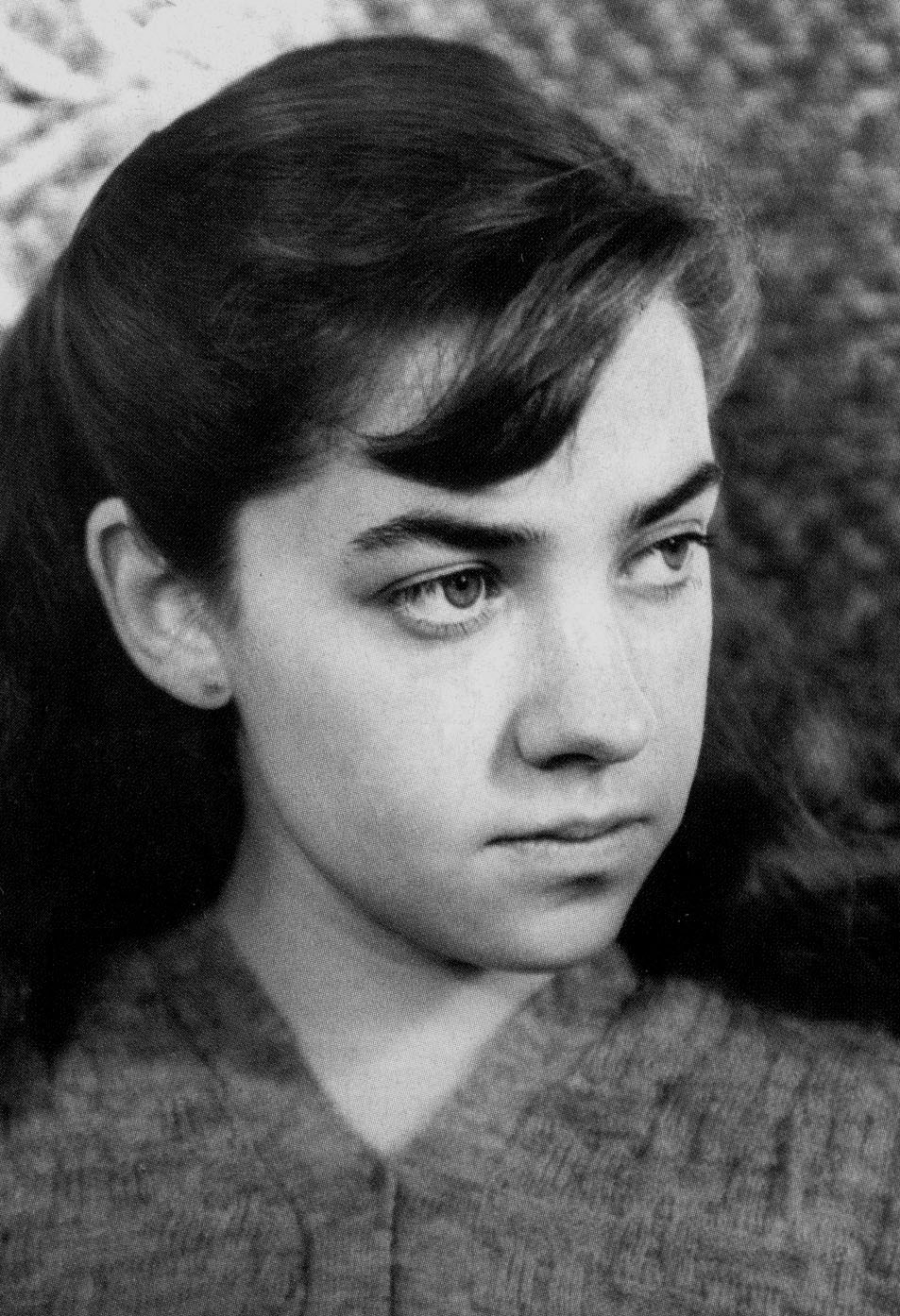
Walsh at 17 years old, when she published her first book, the acclaimed Otoño Imperdonable

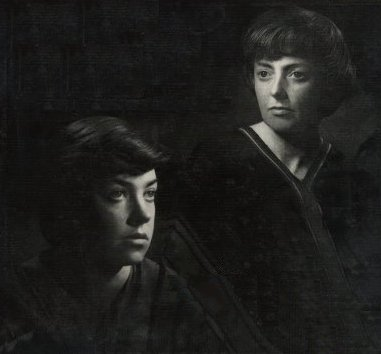
María Elena Walsh and Leda Valladares, 1960

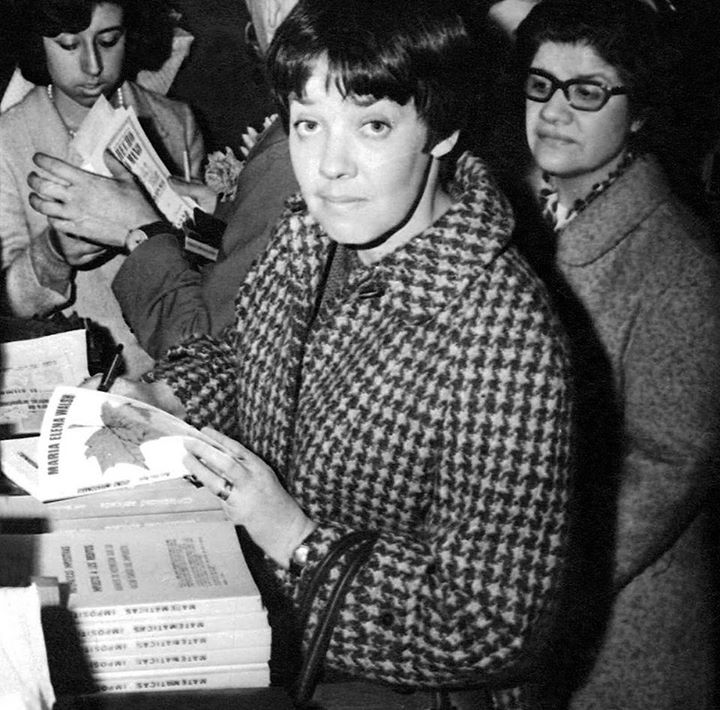
Walsh signing copies of her books, 1962

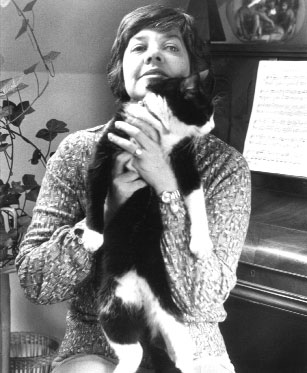
Walsh in 1971

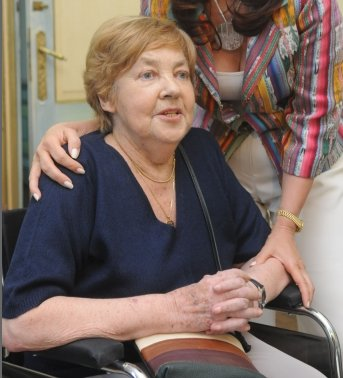
Walsh in 2008

=== Early years (1930–1944) ===
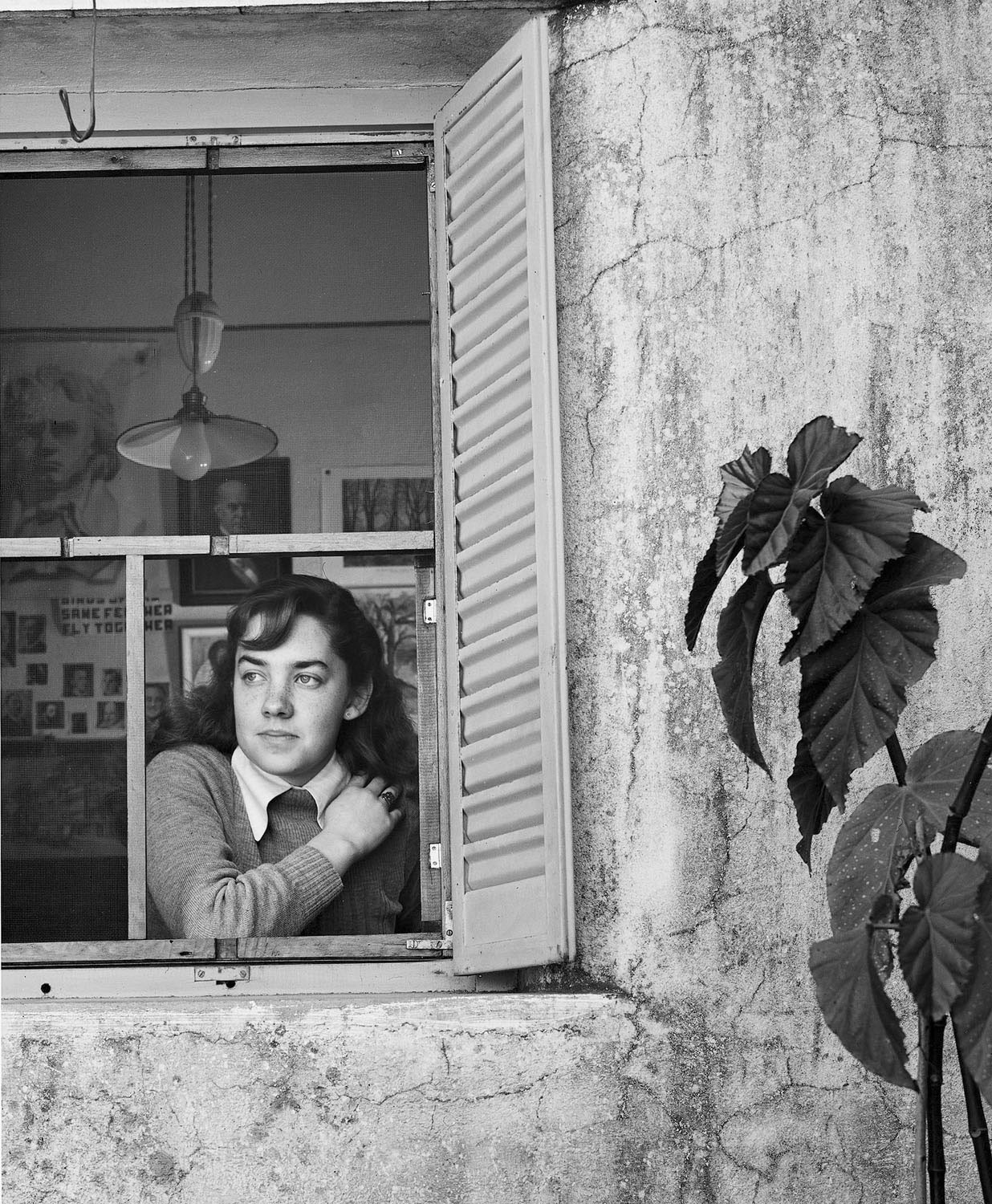
María Elena Walsh in the window of her birthplace, photographed by Grete Stern, 1947.

María Elena Walsh was born on 1 February 1930 in a house at 547 Calle 3 de Febrero in Villa Sarmiento, Morón, Greater Buenos Aires, Buenos Aires Province, as the second daughter of the second marriage of Enrique Roberto Walsh (1882–1947), a railway employee of Irish descent who played the piano, from Brandsen, and Lucía Elena Monsalvo (1895–1961), a housewife from Merlo, of Spanish descent. Her father was a widower and had five children from a previous marriage to María Maroñón: Carlos, Zulema, Mario, Arturo and Enrique. Her sister was Susana Beatriz Walsh (1925–2000), known as "Babe", with whom she had a difficult relationship throughout her life.

As a child, she lived in a big house, where she greatly enjoyed reading and listening to music in a cultural environment. The Walsh family belonged to the educated middle class. Her paternal grandparents were British and had migrated to Argentina in 1872, while her maternal grandparents were Andalusian and Creole. Her grandmother Agnes Hoare (1852–1898), from London, married an Irishman, David Walsh, and had a notable influence on her life, particularly through the letters she left behind, which were later compiled in her book Novios de antaño (1990). María Elena described her as "a great reader... she became desperate when she did not receive the newspaper from England. Those letters revealed to me that she was tremendously interested in Argentine politics at the time." From English popular culture, María Elena adopted the habit of entertaining herself in her early years with nursery rhymes and traditional children's verses sung to her by her father, such as "Baa Baa Black Sheep" and "Humpty Dumpty", and developed the habit of verbal constructions that characterize British nonsense, one of the main sources of inspiration in her work.

Walsh learned to read and write at the early age of four thanks to the teaching of a neighbour. She was also influenced by classical music and opera. Her father often played the piano, especially waltzes by Moszkowski, Waldteufel and Toselli, and the young Walsh was particularly attracted to the music halls shown in neighbourhood cinemas. She defined herself at that time as a "rather difficult, unruly" child who felt "very lonely, melancholic, and suddenly abrupt, sullen". The authoritarianism and severity that her father showed toward her mother marked Walsh's lifelong defence of women.

Walsh entered General Manuel Belgrano Primary School No. 21 at the age of seven and joined third grade directly because she already knew how to read and write. She showed interest in subjects such as Spanish, dictation, calligraphy and drawing, and in her leisure time enjoyed playing statues, tag and trading cards. In literature, Walsh read works by Jules Verne, Charles Dickens and Saturnino Calleja, as well as magazines such as El Tony, Pif Paf and Billiken. In entertainment, she admired Ginger Rogers, Fred Astaire, Jeanette MacDonald and Nelson Eddy.

The expansion of the neighbouring La Chapelle asylum and the culverting of the Maldonado Stream led the Walsh family to move in 1943 to a more modest house on Calle Gaona in Ramos Mejía, which she would describe decades later as "the end of childhood". At the age of 12, in order to perfect her knowledge of painting and drawing, she enrolled on her own initiative at the Escuela Nacional de Bellas Artes Prilidiano Pueyrredón, where her teachers included Fernán Félix de Amador, Hernán Lavalle Cobo, Luis Borraro and Tilda Thamar. Her father distrusted that institution and had instead previously suggested Technical School No. 6 Fernando Fader. The atmosphere of the school was deeply affected after the 1943 Argentine coup d'état, which was reflected in Walsh's earliest writings. Years later, she graduated as a teacher of drawing and painting.

=== First publications and Otoño imperdonable (1945–1947) ===
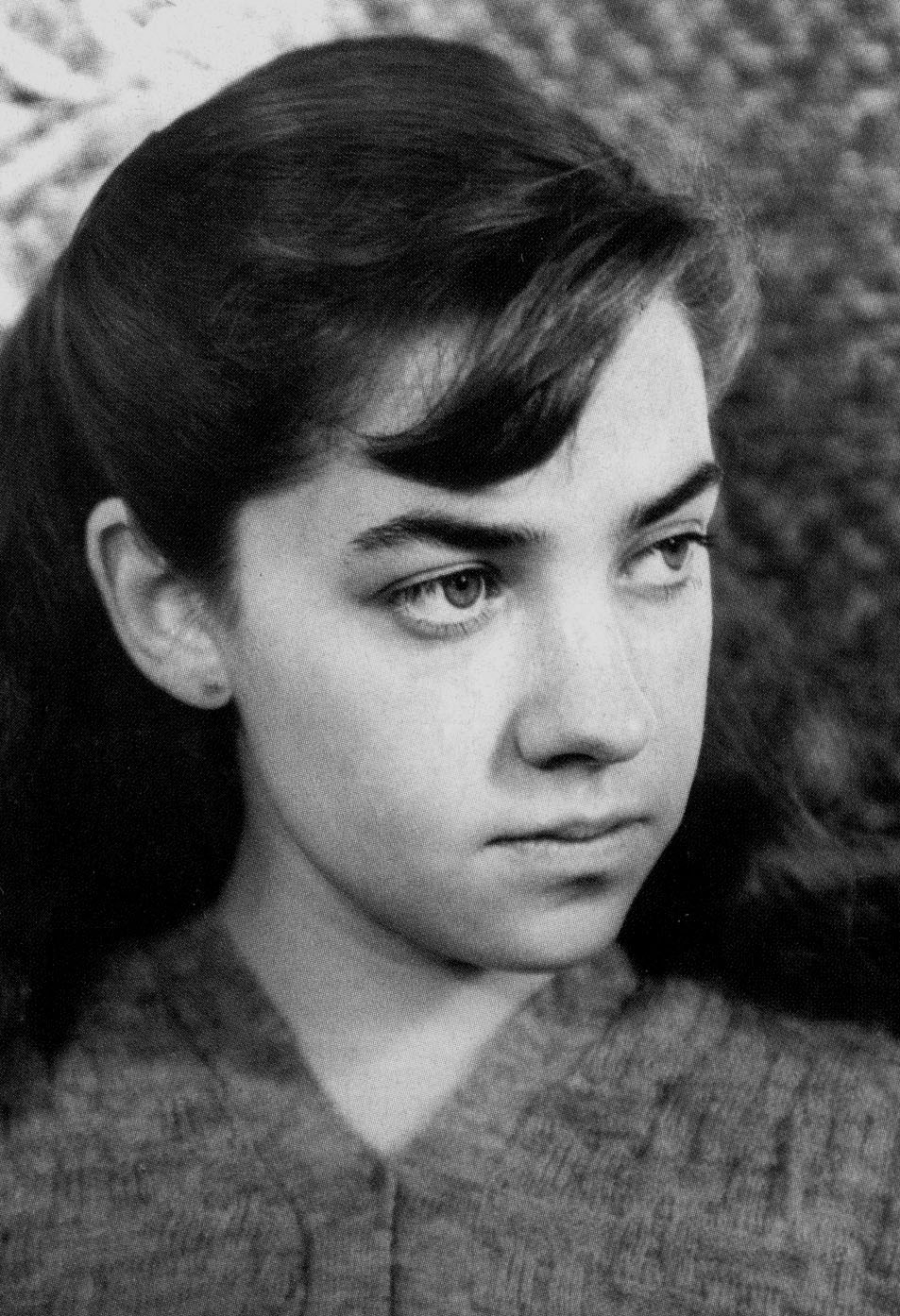
María Elena Walsh in 1947. These images, taken by Grete Stern, also a neighbour in Ramos Mejía, were used to promote her first books.

In 1945, at the age of 15, she published her first poem, titled Elegía, in the magazine El Hogar, illustrated by her schoolmate Elba Fábregas, with whom she had an intimate relationship and to whom Walsh dedicated a poem in Otoño imperdonable, which was her first book, a collection of poems published in 1947, before graduating from art school. It was critically acclaimed and received recognition from important Latin American writers. The psychiatric illness later diagnosed in Fábregas deeply affected Walsh. Walsh also published poems in the La Nación newspaper. Fábregas had advised her to speak with Augusto González Castro, an Ecuadorian poet who worked as editorial secretary of El Hogar, and who decided to give her an opportunity. Following Elegía, her verses began to be published every month, giving Walsh relative financial independence and the possibility of becoming a poet, which translated into a form of rebellion and rejection of the social conventions of her time. In 1946, Walsh, then 16 years old, published Oda del estudiante muerto in La Vanguardia, the socialist newspaper of Juan B. Justo, where she expressed her outrage over a strike in which two students had died. Many of the poems published in El Hogar and La Nación later formed the core of her first book, Otoño imperdonable (1947), for which she received the second municipal prize. From then on, she began to associate regularly with the Hispanic American literary world. According to her biographer Alicia Dujovne, "Buenos Aires went crazy" with the publication of her first book of poems, while Sergio Pujol noted that "her first verses were crossed by melancholy and the pain of a poetic 'I' that lives with emotion and in contact with nature through a series of absences". She befriended Jorge Vocos Lescano, Mario Trejo, León Bouché—the director of El Hogar—Hugo Lezama, Horacio Armani, Roberto Juarroz, Horacio Rega Molina, Ricardo Molinari, Francisco Luis Bernárdez, María Alicia Domínguez and María Granata. She also attended literary gatherings at the Jockey Club, the hall of the Peuser bookshop, the Richmond confectionery and the Van Riel Gallery.

Walsh had tried to publish her first book through Editorial Emecé, which she reached through a letter of recommendation from Eduardo Mallea—who directed the literary supplement of La Nación, where Walsh contributed—but for economic reasons the publisher refused to undertake the edition. Finally, after several failed attempts, she decided to publish it herself and finance it personally. Five hundred copies were printed, which at first were distributed in bookshops in Ramos Mejía and on Florida Street. Walsh left the copies on consignment, accompanied by her friend Mario Trejo, and later collected the commissions. The largest payments came from the Society for the Protection of Popular Libraries, which purchased copies at retail price. On one occasion she even met Pablo Neruda, who invited her up to a small apartment in the Galería Güemes, where he hosted all kinds of artists. Neruda read her book and made complimentary comments about it. In this regard, Dujovne commented that "great figures praise the author, but the author keeps looking at them pensively", and added: "She was still at the moment of hollowing out her voice. Otoño imperdonable is an extraordinary pretentious book, lacking the little bells of grace that in the next room sprang from the author like gentle, natural water."

A review in La Nación stated:

"With a plastic rigour that tolerates no concessions, María Elena Walsh has constructed the poems in her book. Each one is ordered in the balance of its sober architecture, and its richness derives more from what is suggested, from the spiritual atmosphere in which the images float, than from what is expressed in its stripped-down stanzas... Although the nature of her verses lends itself to obscurities arising precisely from the states of mind she paints, the poet avoids, as far as possible, tropes of difficult interpretation. She manages to be original in her comparisons without departing from reality."

Eduardo González Lanuza of Sur commented: "What relief and what oasis-like happiness there is in this certainty of poetry, whose freshness overflows from the fullness of this small book by María Elena Walsh", and regarding the poem Esencia, added: "Who has revealed to her our terrible relationship with poetry?" One of the most complimentary reviews came from Javier Fernández of the weekly Ética: "She is a poet of classical spirit, in the sense of a sober and reflective creator, free from sudden intoxications or pompous dazzlements. If we wished to seek—an old mania—some literary affiliation in María Elena Walsh, we should recognize a beautiful example of multiple and rich assimilations... That transcendent flash of Saint John of the Cross. The sorrowful dreaminess of Antonio Machado. The hazy charm of ancient ballads and an atmosphere pleasing to the spirits of Coleridge and Wordsworth. Let us emphasize: there is no imitation; there is transfiguration."

After the favourable reviews, Walsh developed a friendship with Fernández that consisted of sporadic telephone calls, frequent visits, exchanges and loans of books, and later trips to the diplomatic offices where Fernández carried out his professional life. The architect Carmen Córdova Iturburu also read the book and contacted Walsh by mail, beginning a long friendship.

=== Juan Ramón Jiménez and trip to Maryland (1948–1949) ===
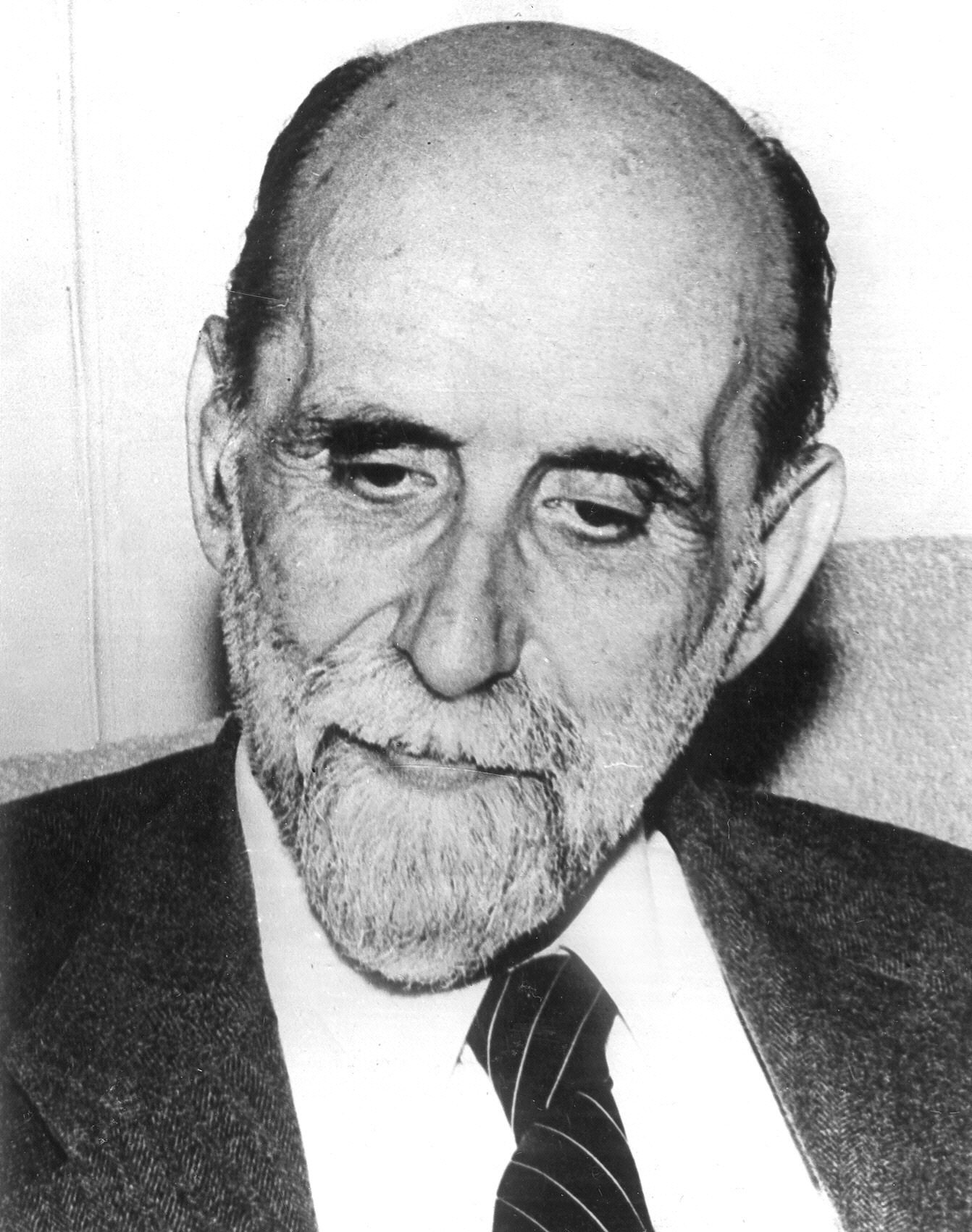
Juan Ramón Jiménez in 1956.

After graduation in 1948, she traveled to North America at the invitation of poet Juan Ramón Jiménez. Communist intellectuals enjoyed enormous prestige in the postwar period after the defeat of fascism. In that context, numerous writers visited Argentina, including Pablo Neruda, Jorge Guillén and León Felipe. The poet Juan Ramón Jiménez, author of Platero y yo, had been "amazed by her expression, her naturalness in the simple and the difficult" after reading Walsh's book. Determined to award scholarships each year to two young people and receive them at his home in Maryland, the offer was directed to Horacio Armani, Carmen Córdova and Walsh, who stood out as major young promises of Argentine poetry. The first two, unable to make the trip for personal reasons, did not accept. Walsh, meanwhile, tried to collect a municipal prize she had won for the book, but was told that the money would not be available soon. Finally, she received a scholarship from the Williams Foundation of the United States Embassy, intended to encourage stays in North America by people connected to science, culture or education, which enabled her to pay for her passage. The five-month stay was very important for Walsh, who regularly attended concerts, shows, museums and exhibitions, and allowed her to connect with American culture, especially with consumer society. However, living with Jiménez and his wife Zenobia Camprubí was not easy for her, and she ended up feeling great personal frustration. In later interviews, Walsh stated that "if Juan Ramón was capable of exerting such a profound influence, it was because I was very impressionable and was placing in him a series of perhaps mistaken expectations. Perhaps I expected a kind and affable teacher, not a figure who could be so categorical and aggressive." Despite this negative aspect, through Jiménez, Walsh met Ezra Pound and Pedro Salinas, and learned from his literary art. Jiménez insisted that she take university courses and seminars in the United States, but Walsh declined because of her language difficulties and aversion to formal education. Instead, she preferred to attend the Library of Congress in Washington, D.C., on her own, where she discovered authors such as Emily Dickinson and Amy Lowell.

It was a complex experience, because Jiménez treated her mercilessly, without any consideration for her needs and personal inclinations. When her savings ran out, Walsh had to give private Spanish lessons to support herself financially. María Elena herself would describe the experience a few years later in these terms:

"Every day I had to invent courage to face him, review my insignificance, cover myself with a misfortune that today enrages me. I felt investigated and condemned. I often recall with resentment the people who, older in the world, held my green destiny in their hands and did nothing but paralyze it. With generous intention, with protective awareness, Juan Ramón was destroying me, and he had no right to be wrong because he was Juan Ramón, and I was nobody. In the name of what must he be forgiven? In the name of what he is and signifies, beyond the failure of a relationship."

— María Elena Walsh

=== Return to Buenos Aires and Baladas con Ángel (1950–1952) ===
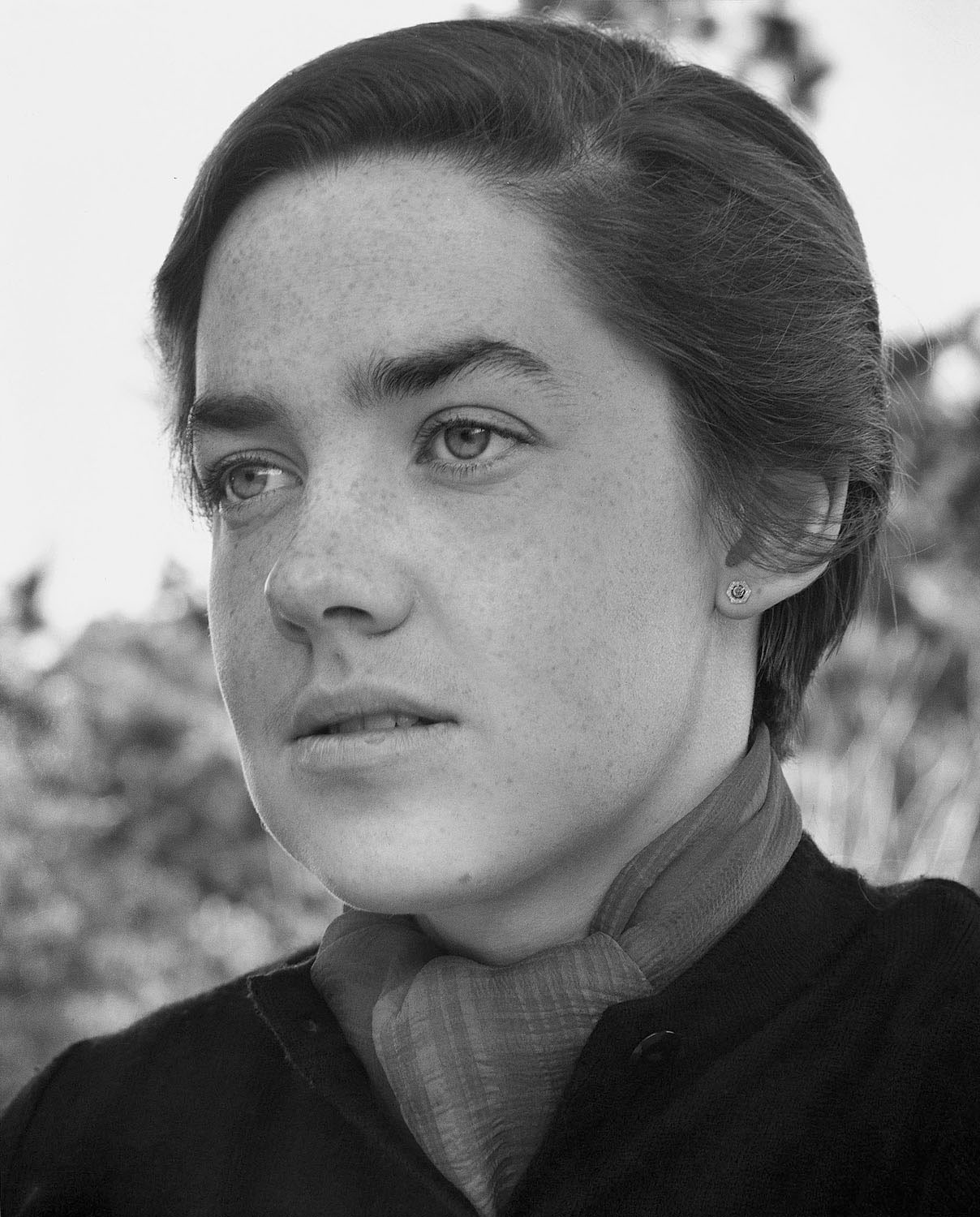
María Elena Walsh in 1952. Collection of the National Museum of Fine Arts.

Back in Buenos Aires, Walsh frequented literary and intellectual circles, usually attended by the Argentine aristocracy, and wrote essays in various publications. She met socialites such as Carmen Gándara, whose charm and lifestyle fascinated her, and she often visited Eduardo Mallea and his wife, Elena Muñoz Larreta. In 1952, before setting out on a trip to Europe, she published Baladas con Ángel, a book of little repercussion containing love poems. At the suggestion of the director of Editorial Losada, Gonzalo Losada, the book was published in the same volume as Argumento del enamorado by Ángel Bonomini, then Walsh's boyfriend. Yvan Goll, a French poet, had published a book under the same model with his wife years earlier. According to Gabriela Massuh, Walsh's book "seems less mature, less elaborated than the previous one". In a 1987 interview, Walsh told Diana Bellessi and Martín Prieto that "that book is a product of repression in the personal and social sense. Of a sinister time that I recommend to the nostalgic. A context of political censorship in which we also had a little boyfriend who lectured us." Héctor A. Murena of Sur wrote in a review that "I do not like this poetry full of decorum and happy discoveries, this poetry so well dressed, so perfectly educated, although it has left me with the desire to read what seems to me to come closer to true poetry."

The personal crisis triggered by the harsh experience in Maryland, the negative reviews of her second book and the problems with Bonomini, whose courtship ended in 1952, according to her biographer Sergio Pujol, caused a "shift toward a religious feeling, until then completely unprecedented in the young woman". The presence of topics such as God and death in poems such as Balada de esperanza was an indication of personal change in the writer. In fact, a lyrical prose text titled "El delirio", addressed to a certain "Hermana Francisca", was published under her authorship in an edition of La Nación on 6 November 1952.

Walsh taught English at Colegio Ward and another institution in Ramos Mejía during those years, but was expelled from one of them for refusing to wear mandatory mourning and for teaching with an English-language copy of La razón de mi vida during the funerals of Eva Perón. Family repression tied to the expected behaviour of women at the time and the authoritarianism she perceived in the Peronist government, together with some jealousy and betrayals within the literary milieu, inspired the idea of a trip to Europe with Leda Valladares. Walsh was delighted by the idea of travelling via the Pacific and sailing on an ocean liner from Valparaíso, crossing the Panama Canal and then heading toward Europe. Although it was not a conventional route, it allowed her to pass through Chile and visit Pablo Neruda and Margarita Aguirre. From that meeting, Walsh maintained a relationship of great cordiality and reciprocity that lasted until the author's death in 1973. After her visit to Chile, she continued to Peru, where she was received by Sebastián Salazar Bondy.

"As with its vain leaves
time was losing me.
Nailed to the wood of another dream
nights and days flew over me.

Filling me with
a distracted nostalgia
the earth, the sea, entered my eyes
and left through idle tears."

— María Elena Walsh, Balada del tiempo perdido (1950).

=== Stay in France and duo with Leda Valladares (1953–1958) ===
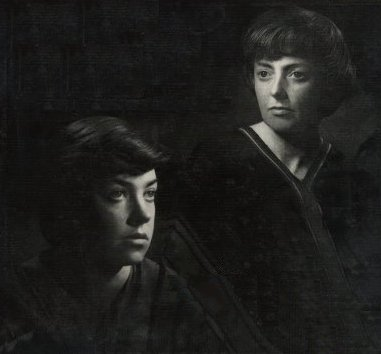
Walsh and Leda Valladares in 1957. Cover photograph of the album Entre valles y quebradas.

Walsh traveled to Europe during the era of Peronism and then moved to Paris, where she spent four years in the early 1950s. Walsh had met Leda Valladares, a writer from Tucumán who was then teaching at the University of Costa Rica, through an exchange of letters, and both discovered that they shared literary and musical tastes, as well as opposition to Peronism. Valladares performed folk songs from the Argentine north and was a specialist in the genre. They decided to meet at a common point in Panama, and travelled through Jamaica and Havana before finally arriving in Paris, thus abandoning their families and intellectual environment to embark on a path of experimentation. Although the initial purpose of their meeting was not to form the artistic duo that later emerged, the success they had when singing for fun on the deck of the ship encouraged them to form a performing partnership. Valladares had a repertoire that included bagualas, vidalas and chacareras, and always travelled with her instruments, including the criollo guitar, the bombo, the charango and the caja. The stimulus Walsh had received from the poet Jiménez, who adored folklore, was fundamental in the singer's assimilation of the folk genre. As Ilse Luraschi and Kay Sibbald observed, "folklore was the germ and driving force of the two activities that gave her the greatest pleasure and success: paraliterature (that is, children's literature and popular song) and performance in theatre and television." While in Paris, Walsh performed in concerts featuring Argentine folklore with fellow Argentine singer Leda Valladares (born 1919), forming the duo "Leda & María" and recording for Le chant du monde. Some of these recordings were exchanged with "Topic Records" in England in the late 1950s.

Lodged in the neighbourhood of Saint-Germain-des-Prés, where both Valladares and Walsh led an austere life, their first impression of Paris was unpleasant. In Walsh's words, "everything seemed dark, cold, sinister, medieval. The people, harsh and unfriendly", and she was appalled by the high levels of poverty she saw in the streets of France as an aftermath of the postwar period. However, she was dazzled by the atmosphere of freedom she perceived, without atavisms or social prejudices. They performed for the first time in a Scandinavian restaurant on rue Gay-Lussac and later at L'Écluse, where Léo Noel, Francis Lemarque, Gilles Ségal, Marcel Marceau and Jacques Fabbri sang. They also performed at the Scandian Club, Chez Pasdoc—where Charles Aznavour began his career—and the Crazy Horse cabaret. On one occasion, the duo won a competition at the Paris Olympia and were offered the chance to sing in the same show as Édith Piaf, but for very poor pay and forty performances a week, which meant the contract did not go ahead. Finally, they chose to appear in a television cycle at the Maison de la ORTF at the end of 1954. Although they were successful in Paris, the duo's intransigence and refusal to make concessions in their repertoire generated fear among impresarios, who doubted the success of their shows. Valladares and Walsh came to perform in four places a night during some seasons, especially at La Guitarre, where they carried out the repertoire of Canciones del tiempo de Maricastaña, and at the cabaret La Canne à Sucre. They were called by a recording company, Le Chant du Monde, which released folk music and distributed records in other countries, and they performed gala programmes in theatres that were broadcast on radio as part of selections of the best music hall numbers. They also performed in different cities in Belgium and recorded a series of radio programmes in London and Cologne, Germany.

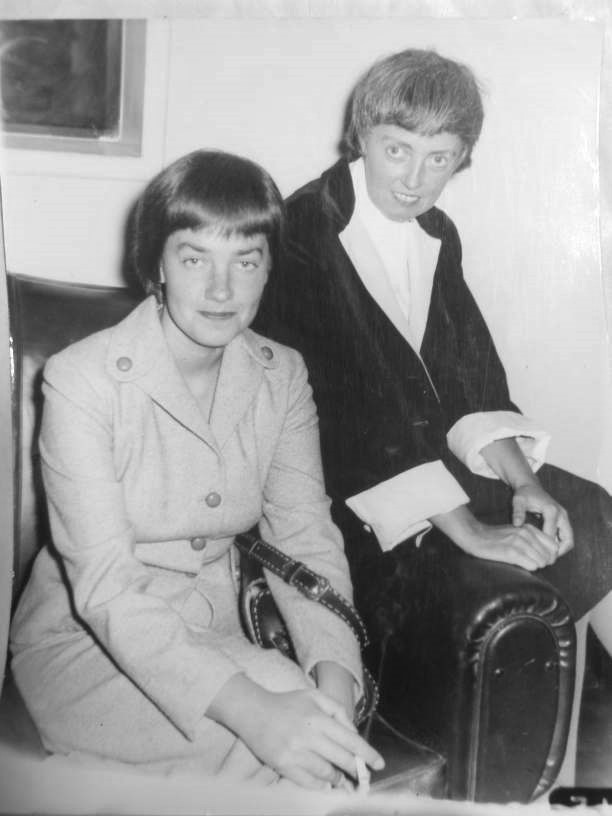
María Elena Walsh and Leda Valladares on an artistic visit to Tucumán, 1956.

In Paris, they associated with other artists such as Violeta Parra—whom Walsh described as "jealous, gloomy and sullen"—Lalo Schifrin, Barbara and Blossom Dearie, and recorded their first albums, Cantos de Argentina (1954) and Bajo los cielos de la Argentina (1955), with songs from the oral tradition of Argentine Andean folklore such as "Dos palomitas" and "Huachi tori", and also with songs by Atahualpa Yupanqui—then based in Paris—such as "La arribeña" by Jaime Dávalos, "El humahuaqueño" by Rafael Rossi and "Viva Jujuy" by Rolando Valladares. Some time later, Cantos de Argentina was released in the United States by the Vanguard label. According to her biographer Pujol, "María Elena's voice sounded 'whiter' than Leda's; the latter reproduced the inflections and timbres of the bagualeras of northern Argentina." On a second trip to London, in an effort to continue their recordings, they contacted the musicologist Alan Lomax, director of the Folkways label, who showed little enthusiasm for what they were doing and ended up discouraging them.

Walsh carried much of the show; she was responsible for introducing the songs, explaining what they were about and adding jokes or anecdotes to the introduction. Valladares, eleven years older than Walsh, was more rigid regarding repertoire and the formal presentation of the show. The differences between Valladares and Walsh became more pronounced over time, since it was difficult to prepare a show based on the anthropological study Valladares wanted rather than on the commercial apparatus. Walsh valued the complete show, even with those occasional songs that had to be included because the public demanded them, such as the "Carnavalito humahuaqueño". Valladares defended the value of Indigenismo and pure folklore, in the sense of anonymous creation, while Walsh leaned toward creating new expressions nourished by folk roots but not strictly restricted to them. Despite this, the duo lasted ten years. The proliferation of more competitive and commercially flexible Latin American groups, such as Los Chalchaleros and the trio Los Panchos, eventually replaced Walsh and Valladares over time.

Back in Argentina in 1956, they carried out an extensive tour of the Argentine Northwest, where they performed several songs that were later gathered in their first two albums made in the country, the two volumes of Entre valles y quebradas, both from 1957. In the northern provinces, they also attended an edition of the Manca Fiesta, or Fiesta de la Olla, an Indigenous fair with people who came down once a year from the high plateau with primitive pottery objects to barter them for agricultural and manufactured products. Both records were very well received in artistic and intellectual circles, including by Cuchi Leguizamón, Manuel J. Castilla, Victoria Ocampo, Atahualpa Yupanqui and María Herminia Avellaneda, who brought the duo to perform on Canal 7. The records sold well, despite the European background and features of their performers, a recurring criticism among their detractors. The following year, in 1958, they released Canciones del tiempo de Maríacastaña, entirely devoted to couplets from the old Spanish ballad tradition, which, although they had performed them previously, they had never recorded systematically in a recording studio.

=== Professional setbacks and the beginning of her children's work (1959–1963) ===
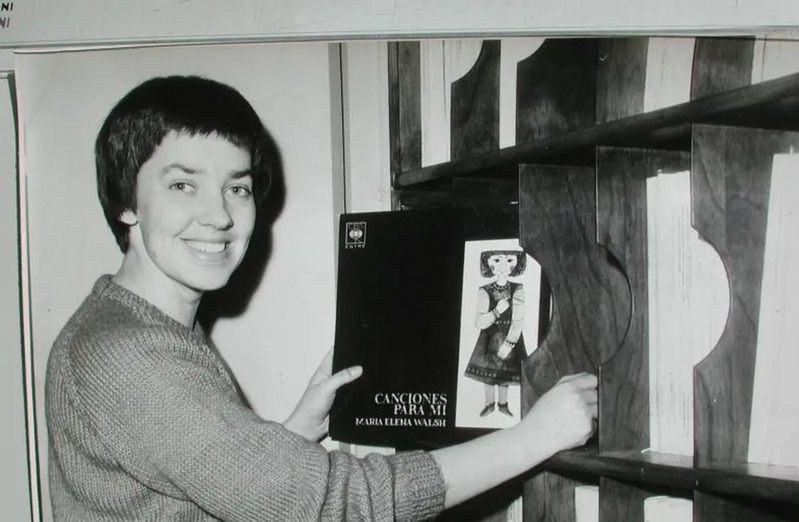
María Elena Walsh with a copy of the album Canciones para mí (1963).

In Paris, partly motivated by the decline of the duo Leda y María, she began creating poems, songs and children's characters that were later included in Tutú Marambá. The children's writer and editor Fryda Shultz de Mantovani, a friend of Victoria Ocampo, tried unsuccessfully to present them to a couple of publishers. In that poetry collection, she shaped her main characters: Doña Disparate, King Bombo, the Studious Cow and Jacinta the Monkey. The vast majority of them were presented in Los sueños del Rey Bombo, a show that premiered at the Teatro Auditorium in Mar del Plata in February 1959. The press noted of the work that "the author tells no story; she only speaks poetically of some beings" and, in general, reviews were negative or focused on the acting work of Roberto Aulés. La Nación wrote that "nothing is serious in this piece and nothing calls upon the realistic and rational position of the everyday world... Birds speak, dreams materialize, frogs sing with human voices; suburban mice walk while tracing tango-like quebradas, in the manner of the 1900s; the whole world is informal, childlike, plastic, fluid, poetic". At the end of the summer, the work moved to the Teatro Presidente Alvear and, in 1962, was revived at the Teatro Cómico. A record with material from the work was also released in 1960 through Plin, a record label founded by Valladares and Walsh, which had no impact. It included the first four Walsh songs to be recorded: "La vaca estudiosa", "Canción del pescador", "El reino del revés" and "Canción de titina".

She returned to Argentina in 1956 after the Revolución Libertadora. In 1958, she had been invited to work on Buenos días, Pinky, a programme starring Lidia Satragno, where she served as a scriptwriter. The programme lasted only three months, but achieved notable success, earning two Martín Fierro Awards. Walsh, for her part, received the Argentores award for best scriptwriter and described her work as "arduous, difficult, but also extremely gratifying" and "a great workshop for me". The scripts of one of the programmes starring Pinky were later reworked for Dailan Kifki, a children's book about the adventures of an elephant, published in 1966.

From 1958 onwards, Walsh wrote numerous TV scripts, plays, poems, books and songs, specially dedicated to young children. She was also a successful performer, singing her own songs onstage and recording them later in albums, like Canciones para mirar, Canciones para mí and El País de Nomeacuerdo. Juguemos en el mundo, also an album, was a satirical show for adults, which was made into a film of the same title, albeit with a story unrelated to the original stage show and songs recording. The film was based on her characters Doña Disparate y Bambuco and was directed by her partner at that time, María Herminia Avellaneda (1933–1997).

María Herminia Avellaneda, who had seen her presentation of Tutú Marambá, proposed in 1959 that she make a children's television programme, which eventually led to the premiere of Doña Disparate y Bambuco, performed by Lydia Lamaison, Osvaldo Pacheco, Pepe Soriano and Teresa Blasco. There, Walsh performed her first children's songs, but the experience lasted four months. In this work—one of the last in which Valladares and Walsh participated together—Mono Liso appeared and, above all, Manuelita the turtle, the best-known character in the children's universe created by Walsh. The work resembled the dreamlike atmosphere of Alice's Adventures in Wonderland, although some critics warned that the language used by Walsh was too unintelligible for children. Walsh again collaborated as a scriptwriter with Avellaneda on Soledad Monsalvo (1960) for Canal 7 and Yo soy... usted (1961), which incorporated and addressed highly unusual social and cultural issues, such as the economic difficulties and labour relations of a young married couple.

The critic Leopoldo Brizuela noted:

"According to interviews from the time, Walsh conceived Doña Disparate as the parodic embodiment of common sense, while Bambuco is the 'personification of childhood'. But, more deeply, both represent Walsh's two personalities: the rigorous, romantic and somewhat overly rhetorical one of Otoño imperdonable, and the childlike, popular and somewhat overly fresh one of Tutú Marambá. The two go out to duel, never defeat one another, and are always reborn in the ever more luminous bonfire of humour, in the brave ordeal of creation."

— Leopoldo Brizuela.

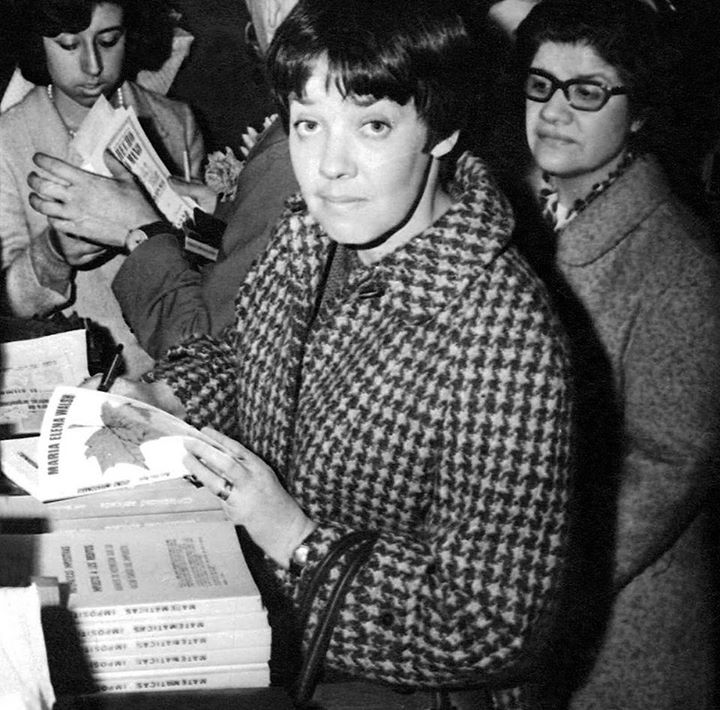
Walsh signing autographs at the El Ateneo bookshop, September 1962.

Her mother's death in 1961 from thyroid cancer and the breakdown of her personal relationship with Valladares plunged Walsh into a deep depression that led her to undergo sleep-cure treatments. After a professional impasse, she created the children's show Canciones para mirar, of which a record version was also made. Walsh's original idea was to create a genre similar to a "cabaret for children" or a "children's variety show" that would revolutionize entertainment, folklore and children's music, a show in which one number was replaced by another that had nothing to do with the previous one, in a kind of pantomime. It premiered at the Teatro Infantil in Necochea and then at the Teatro Municipal General San Martín, with great success. A chronicler for Primera Plana stated that "there were cases of children attending the show fourteen times" and the writer Victoria Ocampo, who attended the work, also made favourable comments about it. Its success was such that the work premiered with a different cast in New York. According to her biographer Pujol, Walsh not only entertained children, but was developing a new "literary genre", while also founding a "new type of singer-songwriter song", since there were few precedents for children's literature and songs in Argentina at the time. The albums Canciones para mí and Canciones para mirar were recorded consecutively throughout 1963 and released in 1964 by CBS Columbia, which ensured good press and wide distribution.

=== Transition from children's repertoire to adult songs (1964–1967) ===
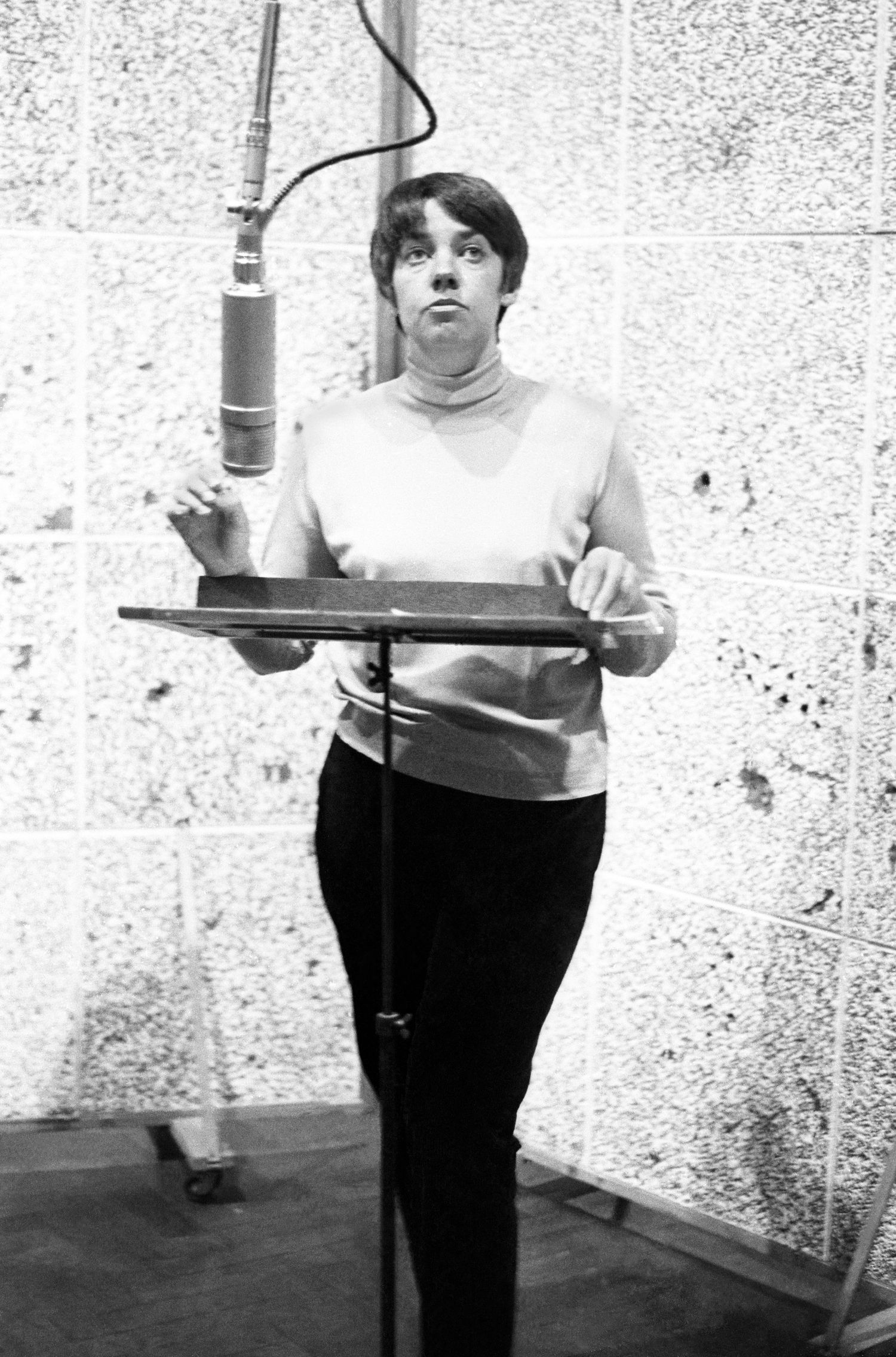
María Elena Walsh in a recording studio.

Canciones para mirar was followed by the publication of five children's books, El reino del revés (1964), Zoo loco (1964), Dailan Kifki (1966), Cuentopos de Gulubú (1966) and Aire libre (1967), which strongly shaped the cultural education of subsequent generations of Argentines. By then, Valladares and Walsh had decided that they wanted to follow different paths and, before separating in 1963, recorded one last LP, Navidad para los chicos, which brought together four Christmas songs by Walsh in which both sang with Roberto Aulés. Later, around 1967, Walsh realized that television entrepreneurs had little incentive to invest large sums of money in an audience that lacked the purchasing power of adults. The lack of commercial interest—the same reason that had frustrated the continuation of the duo Leda y María—and Walsh's fear of repeating old work formulas gradually led her to write songs for adults.

Thus, in 1965 she released Hecho a mano, a poetry collection for adults that Oscar Hermes Villordo described as an "ironic, wisely formal work, with much of the magic of everyday speech", and Versos para cebollitas, a compilation of children's folk verses produced with the collaboration of León Benarós, Manuel J. Castilla and Carlos Vega.

In 1966, El país del Nomeacuerdo marked the close of her cycle of children's songs and the beginning of her collaboration with the musician Oscar Cardozo Ocampo; indeed, the versions of "Marcha de Osías", "La reina batata", "El gato confite" and "Canción del jacarandá" were produced with a different approach to instrumentation that marked a transition to her adult-song repertoire. Around that time, Walsh began to take an interest in pedagogy and read empirical research by Arnold Gesell, Henri Wallon and Jean Piaget that analysed children's games and reflected on their functions in the process of prefiguration and learning. The success of her children's songs had led her to sell more than ten thousand copies annually of each of her records, achieve box-office successes with her plays and several editions of her books—Tutú Marambá had reached nine editions by 1968— which allowed her to live from the royalties she managed from them.

She also published Aire libre (1967), a second-grade textbook released by Estrada publishing house that constituted Walsh's only curricular attempt. It was described as a "true time bomb in the antiquated building of children's pedagogy" and included an anthology of poetry by Baldomero Fernández Moreno, José Tallón and Alfonsina Storni. By then, Walsh had received, among other honours, the gold medal of the Argentores and first prize from the Association of Theatre Critics of Buenos Aires and Montevideo.

=== Songs for adults (1968–1975) ===
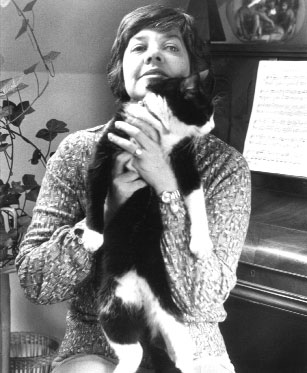
María Elena Walsh with her cat, photographed by Pepe Fernández, 1971.

In those years, when Walsh felt that her children's repertoire was exhausted and feared monotonously repeating, like many authors, one of her past successes, she turned to writing songs for adults. She composed emblematic pieces such as "Zamba para Pepe", "Serenata para la tierra de uno", "Barco quieto", "La Juana" and "Los ejecutivos". In 1968 she was invited by the director of the Teatro Regina, María Luz Regás, to give a recital and, to Walsh's surprise, although she expected to meet audience expectations within a week, the show ran for an entire year at the theatre and then toured the interior of the country. The show contained songs for adults and was titled Juguemos en el mundo or Show para los ejecutivos. Ernesto Schoo of Primera Plana described it as a "miracle in Buenos Aires", while La Nación called it a "multiple, splendid, graceful and melancholy game". Walsh herself confessed in an interview: "I did not do it before because I was afraid. A terrible fear, but not of failure. I was afraid of making a mistake, afraid of the stage. Why not? Only shameless people are not afraid. I have seen how little dogs, dressed in skirts for their acrobatic numbers, die of fear when facing the audience."

Juguemos en el mundo had decisive importance in the course of popular music in the late 1960s and 1970s. In a report for Primera Plana, Ernesto Schoo examined the phenomenon of the "new Argentine song", recognizing Walsh's decisive role. Although he noted the earlier work of Dina Rot and Carlos Waxemberg, he acknowledged that Walsh's songs gave strong momentum to a type of Argentine song that was not closely tied to traditional genres. Referring to the fact that each spectator returned home convinced that Walsh had sung to him or her in particular, as though a sociological study had preceded the show, Oscar Cardozo Ocampo stated that "she had a song for each person in the audience. Halfway through the recital, with a fan of songs unfolded, each person knew which part of the show was aimed at them. It was a strange phenomenon; I have rarely seen anything like it."

"When she was preparing a show she spent the whole day calm, silent, meditating on what she was going to do that night, trying not to be distracted by anything. It was total dedication. Thanks to that concentration she achieved a command of the audience unlike anything I had ever seen before. One felt how the mood of the people changed as she wished. With a turn of her gaze, a gesture of her hand, one could clearly perceive the passage of a current through the audience."

— María Herminia Avellaneda.

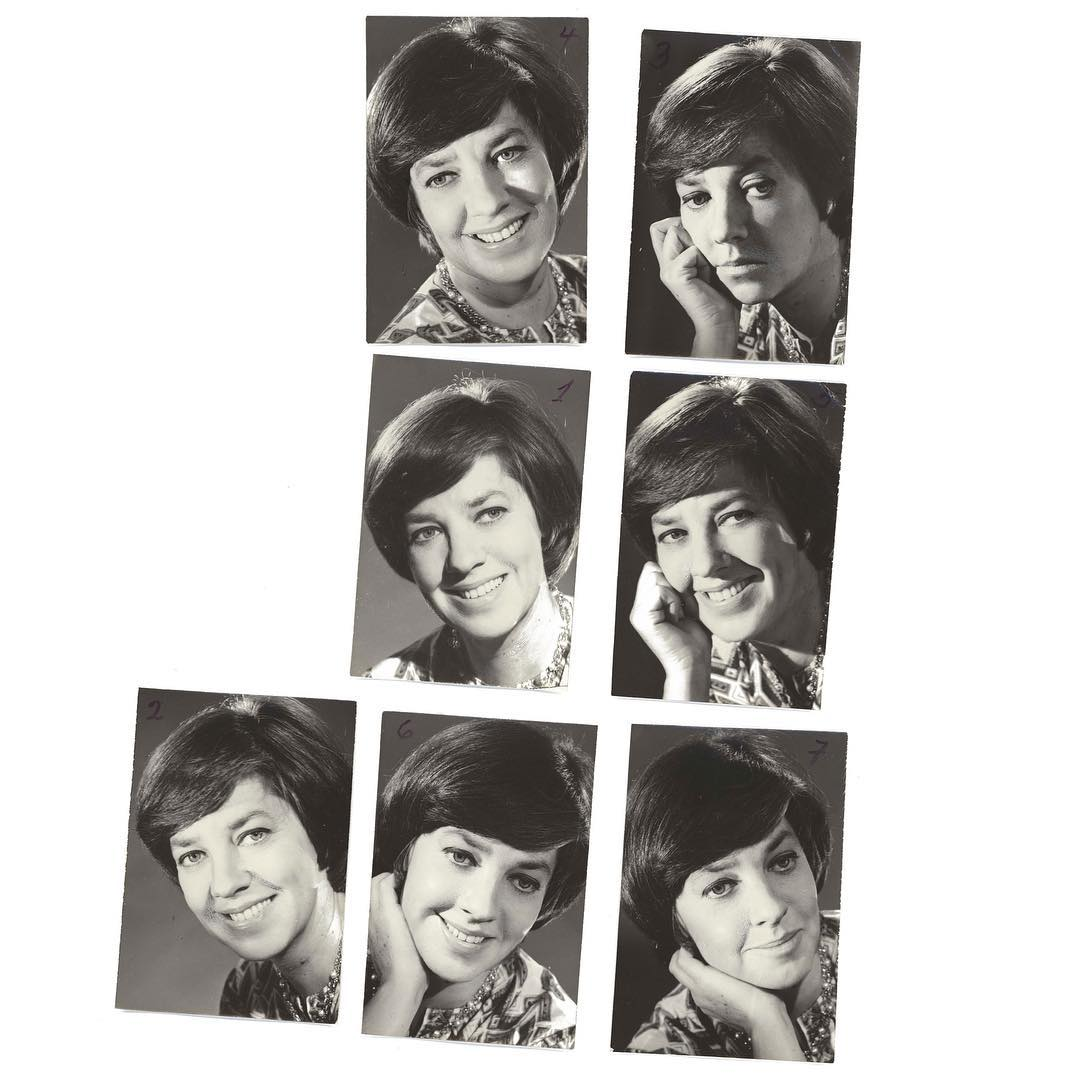
Portraits of Walsh taken by Foto Estudio Luisita in the early 1970s.

From her gallery of characters, the figure of the executive stood out; its song was the most widely disseminated through recordings by the author, Tita Merello, Horacio Molina and Susana Rinaldi. The executive was a businessman who had supported the Onganía coup d'état and lived absorbed in international stock-exchange quotations. "Los ejecutivos" was recorded by CBS alongside other songs including "Para los demás", "Vals del diccionario", "Zamba para Pepe", "El 45" and "Miranda y Mirón". The following year, in 1969, the second volume of Juguemos en el mundo premiered pieces such as "Sapo fiero", "Canción de cuna para gobernantes", "Fideos finos", "El señor Juan Sebastián" and "El señor Ravel". The songs were also brought to film through Juguemos en el mundo (1971), directed by María Herminia Avellaneda, the only audiovisual document of Walsh in which she recreated her own compositions, although in box-office terms it was a resounding failure. Apart from some arrangements by Santiago Chouhy, Mario Cosentino and Juan Pugliano, the musician most committed to her work was Cardozo Ocampo, whose knowledge of popular music enriched Walsh's repertoire. Throughout her later records—El sol no tiene bolsillos, Como la cigarra, El buen modo and De puño y letra—she also included musical collaborations with Chico Novarro, Héctor Stamponi, Oscar Alem and Jairo.

In 1972, she toured the United States, Costa Rica and Mexico, where she met Juan Rulfo, and, upon returning, in an effort to recover financially after the failure of the film Juguemos en el mundo, she undertook several theatre seasons at the Teatro Regina and the Teatro Municipal General San Martín between 1972 and 1974, notably her performances with the recital El buen modo. She also published four children's storybooks with Estrada publishing house: El diablo inglés—the most notable—La sirena y el capitán, Angelito and El país de la geometría.

=== Premature retirement and fight against bone cancer (1976–1982) ===
During the military dictatorship (1976–83) she was a fierce opponent, her song "Oración a la justicia" (Prayer for Justice) became a civil right anthem. In an open letter she criticized the regime censorship comparing the country to a preschool, calling it "Desventuras en el Pais-Jardin-de-Infantes" (Misadventures in the Preschool Country).

In July 1978, at the age of 48, Walsh informed the press that she would no longer compose or sing. In response to Olga Pinasco, who asked why she was leaving the stage at the height of her career, Walsh replied: "With Chau Ejecutivos I close a stage that I feel is exhausted, and I need to end it this way. When I no longer feel like doing something—I find it indecent to do something without desire—I know that stage is over." In essence, Chau Ejecutivos was her final recital, but she did not cease her public interventions as a critic of culture and politics. Her partner, Sara Facio, said: "In '78 we spectators felt a great void. But living with her, I was able to understand it: María Elena is the kind of person who never takes sufficient advantage of success. I have known only one artist with that characteristic: Astor Piazzolla. He put together and dismantled his quintet without caring about success, leaving his followers bewildered." Indeed, Walsh's voice showed some signs of weakness and her ingenuity for composition seemed to be running out. Her last album, De puño y letra (1976), had premiered songs that, except for "El valle y el volcán" and "Sábana y mantel", had no impact. On the other hand, censorship pressures between 1976 and 1978, after the coup d'état, became unbearable for Walsh, who was virtually unable to sing without omissions a repertoire intended to "tickle power", as she used to say, although the singer had no political affiliation. One of her songs, "Gilito de Barrio Norte", was even banned by the Comfer. On another occasion, she was ordered to remove "Palomas de la ciudad" from the repertoire during a performance she was to give in a venue directed by Blackie.

During those years, Walsh undertook various trips through Europe, the United States and Latin America and reached an agreement with the newspaper Clarín to send articles on writers and travel impressions from abroad to be published in the supplement Cultura y Nación, although she also wrote denunciatory articles such as "Argentinos sin alma", published in October 1980, which reflected on the unfair competition faced by Argentine music in relation to imported music.

Her work has often contained an underlying political message, as in the song El País del Nomeacuerdo ("I-Don't-Remember Land"), which was later used as the theme song for the film The Official Story, winner of the 1985 Academy Award for Best Foreign Language Film.

Her most famous and controversial publication appeared on 16 August 1979 under the title "Desventuras en el país-jardín-de-infantes", where she reflected on censorship under the military government. The title was reused in 1993 for a book.

"For some time now we have been like children and cannot say what we think or imagine. When the censor disappears—because someday he will succumb, demolished by a motorway!—we will be decrepit and no longer know what to say. We will have forgotten the how, the where and the when, and we will sit in a square like the old couple in Quino's drawing who asked each other: 'What were we...?'"

— María Elena Walsh in Desventuras en el país jardín de infantes (1979).

The article, in essence, placed the reader in a country turned into a schoolroom, at the front of which stood a monitor or censor, an omnipotent figure who, in the manner of Big Brother from George Orwell, observed everything for repressive purposes. Although the article made some serious concessions to the military, especially by recognizing an important role for them in the fight against guerrillas, its general tone was disparaging toward the monitor, whom it treated as repressive, brutish and ignorant. After its publication, La Azotea, the publishing house directed by Sara Facio, received constant calls throughout the day in solidarity with the author, filling an entire cassette of the answering machine. A few days later, Walsh received a call from María Herminia Avellaneda telling her that, according to a notification that had just reached the channel, the television and radio broadcast of all her songs and books had been prohibited.

Between 1979 and 1980, Walsh was in the Nordic countries—from which came the article "El país escandinavo" of November 1979—and visited Paris, where she made a French version of her songs and recorded an album with Jairo, Chansons a regarder, with a cover illustrated by Guillermo Mordillo.

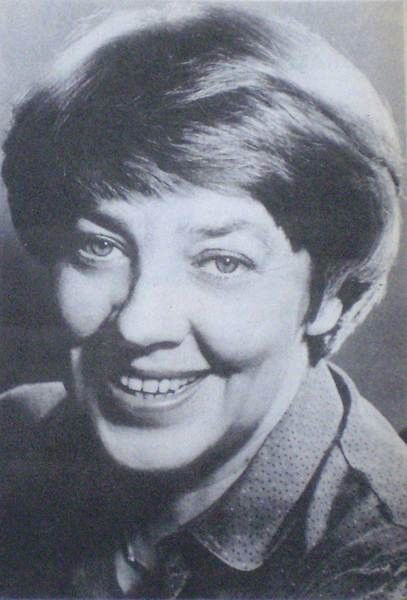
María Elena Walsh in 1982.

Around that time, her health began to falter. After several months of severe leg and hip pain and successive misdiagnoses, Walsh was admitted in 1981 to the Instituto del Diagnóstico with a guarded prognosis because of a fractured femur. Later that year, she was diagnosed with bone cancer, which she described as her "own National Reorganization Process", and amputation of one leg was considered, on the conviction that "whoever has arms can walk", but Walsh declined to undergo the procedure. She was later admitted to various sanatoriums in the city, including Bustamante, Anchorena and Bazterrica, where she underwent radiation therapy and chemotherapy, as well as several surgeries aimed at saving the affected leg. In November 1981, she gave an interview to the magazine Gente, where she stated: "I am living on borrowed time" and later said: "I am 51 years old and I love life. That is why I fight."

=== Return of democracy and later life (1983–1999) ===
In 1982, Susana Rinaldi premiered Hoy como ayer, a show conceived as a tribute to Walsh that covered all her songs for adults and helped support the author at a difficult moment in her life. With the establishment of democracy in 1983, she hosted the daily television programme La cigarra on Canal 11 together with Susana Rinaldi and María Herminia Avellaneda; it broke with the traditional afternoon programmes aimed at housewives, such as Buenas tardes, mucho gusto, and was one of the first television cycles of the democratic and feminist era. There, the Mothers and Grandmothers of Plaza de Mayo appeared on local television for the first time. They also interviewed artists and politicians censored during the military dictatorship. The cycle drew criticism and scepticism for its journalistic and opinion content, and was taken off the air six months after its launch in 1984 after failing to meet the expectations it had generated. The magazine Humor, for example, published a cover that read: "La cigarra is not a bug, it is three."

Walsh showed signs of rapprochement with the Radical government of Raúl Alfonsín at the beginning of his term, especially regarding human-rights policies. Indeed, her translation of "We shall overcome", a civil-rights anthem, was performed by Jairo at the closing event of his presidential campaign and some of her songs, such as "La cigarra", were reinterpreted and popularized in a context of revisionism. In March 1984, she joined the Council for the Consolidation of Democracy and was appointed ad honorem adviser to the Secretariat of Human Development and Family, a post she resigned on 26 March 1986 because of the bureaucratization and ineffectiveness that Walsh perceived in the area of culture. In a letter sent to Alfonsín himself, she wrote: "Since in two years I was never summoned to give an opinion on these matters, my resignation seems obvious, but it is my duty to submit it to you, Mr President, together with my gratitude for the confidence you placed in me." Some time later, in an interview with the magazine Somos after finishing her collaboration on the texts for the documentary La República perdida (1985), she stated that politics seemed "terrifying" to her. Even so, she resumed her activities in the Society of Argentine Authors and Composers—where she had worked briefly during Ariel Ramírez's administration in the 1970s—and took charge of the institution's cultural activities.

In the last 20 years of her life, she received multiple honours. She was named an "Illustrious Citizen of the City of Buenos Aires" in 1985 and received recognition from the Asociación Mutual Israelita Argentina for the Hebrew version of her stories in 1987. That same year, the Embassy of Poland decorated her with the Order of the Smile and, in March 1990, the University of Córdoba awarded her an honorary doctorate (Doctor honoris causa). The government of Buenos Aires Province declared her an "Illustrious Personality" in 1991 and, in 1995, she received the José Martí world prize for children's literature.

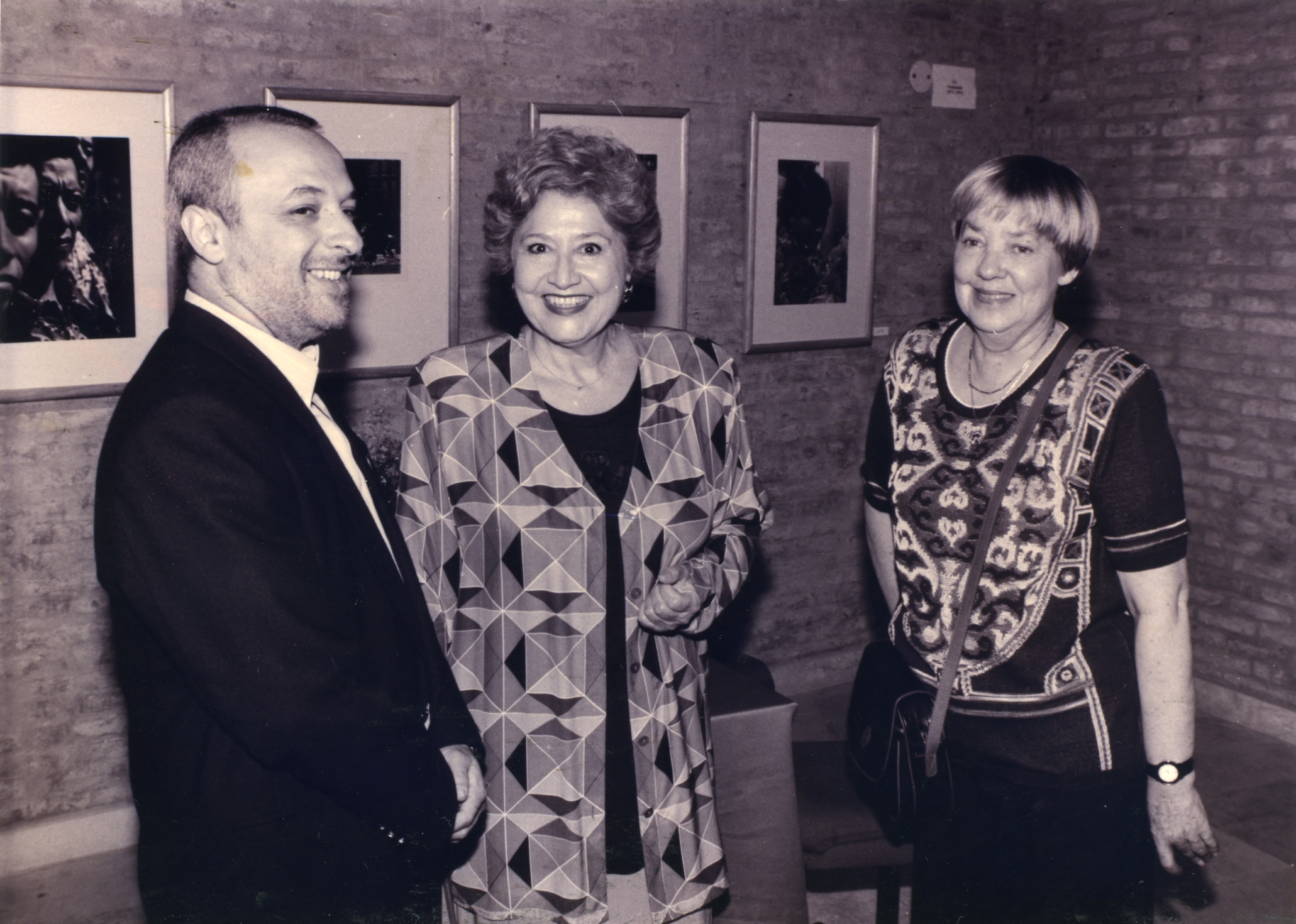
Sara Facio and María Elena Walsh at the Centro Cultural Parque España, Rosario, 1995.

In 1990, she published an autobiographical book, Novios de antaño, in which she evoked her early years. In the mid-1990s, she began drafting Manuelita, ¿a dónde vas?, in which she set out to rework her most famous song into an episodic novel. The book was released in 1997 and aroused no interest. Although her economic situation after retirement was satisfactory and none of the activities she undertook were motivated by money, she had to make sure that her songs and books did not go too long without being reissued. The urgency with which she associated herself with the literary agent Guillermo Schavelzon and changed publishers in her later years—from Sudamericana to Alfaguara, via Espasa Calpe—had to do with her desire to encourage reissue policies, the possibility of accessing better advance contracts and improving the graphic quality of her editions.

In August 1997, the Sony label released Cantamos a María Elena Walsh in tribute to the author. Walsh rarely appeared in public and continued to be difficult with interviewers, although she occasionally expressed opinions in newspapers or magazines. She supported the initiative by Carlos Menem's culture minister, Jorge Asís, to eliminate advertising in English, criticized officials of the Government of the City of Buenos Aires over the difficulties faced by disabled people in moving around public spaces, and caused a major stir with her article "La ñ también es gente", defending the use of that letter on imported computer keyboards:

"Let us not allow the eñe to be snatched from us! They have already stolen from us the opening question and exclamation marks. They have already reduced us to apocope [...] Let us remain owners of something that belongs to us, that letter with a little cap, something very small, but less silly than it seems [...] The survival of this letter concerns us, without distinction of sex, creed or software programme. Let us fight so as not to add more firewood to the bonfire where our discriminated sign is debated [...] The eñe is also people."

— María Elena Walsh, La Nación, 1996.

When, in 1991, during the presidency of Carlos Menem in Argentina, the possibility of implementing the death penalty was debated, she wrote a reflection on the subject that ended with the following sentence:

"Throughout history, learned or brutal men have known with certainty which crime deserved capital punishment. They always knew that I, and no one else, was guilty. They never doubted that the punishment was exemplary. Every time this chastisement is invoked, humanity retreats on all fours."

— María Elena Walsh, Clarín, 12 September 1991.

In 1994 she was Highly Commended for the Hans Christian Andersen Award, a prize awarded by the International Board on Books for Young People.

Regarding Menemism, she did not have an especially negative view of its leader or his government, and maintained friendships with supporters of his policies, such as Bernardo Neustadt and Gerardo Sofovich. In December 1997, the publication of an article by her in La Nación against the Carpa Blanca generated repudiation and negative criticism, especially from the teachers protesting in front of the Congress of the Argentine Nation. The article was harsh toward the teachers, and Walsh described the tent as something of "coarse ugliness" that impoverished the city's landscape. She referred to the protest as a "barter between the union leaders and the promoters of native and foreign artists", and severely criticized the fast to which the demonstrators had resorted as a form of protest. A group of teachers wrote a letter of redress in Página/12, stating that her words had caused "Astonishment. Indignation. But above all an immense disappointment. That is the feeling of those of us who never thought that those verses in which, speaking from the teacher's skin, you said 'I live mending hardships and consoling miseries' were 'an appeal to popular sentimentality'." Quino even compared her to the character Susanita from Mafalda, and the writer Graciela Montes wrote, as a personal letter, that "no one in their right mind considers you a dinosaur", referring to Walsh. As a consequence of her remarks, sales of her books fell drastically, both at Seix Barral and Espasa Calpe, but her popularity resurged in 1999 with the premiere of the film Manuelita, directed by Manuel García Ferré, which was a resounding success and made her known to new generations.

=== Final years and death (2000–2011) ===
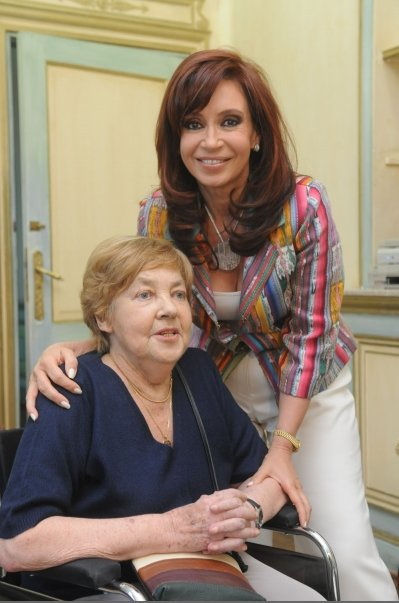
María Elena Walsh with President Cristina Fernández de Kirchner at a meeting in the Casa Rosada, 2008.

Her last books were Hotel Pioho's Palace (2002) and Fantasmas en el parque ("Ghosts in the Park", 2008). Graciela Melgarejo, in a review for the cultural magazine of La Nación, described the latter book, autobiographical in tone, as "a new flower that grows, mysterious and perfect, in the middle of a great city park and on the remains of a prison". In Fantasmas en el parque, Walsh referred for the first time to Sara Facio, with whom she had lived for 30 years, confessing that "she is my great love, that love which does not wear out but is transformed into perfect companionship". In 2009, the scripts of Canciones para mirar and Doña Disparate y Bambuco were published for the first time, and a show, Varieté para María Elena, directed by Gerardo Sofovich, was staged at the Teatro Tabarís.

In 2005, she was diagnosed with severe osteoporosis, which caused great bone weakness. During the Christmas season that year, Walsh was unable to sit at the table because of spontaneous vertebral fractures caused by her illness. The pain and fractures she suffered led her to take strong painkillers and remain in a state of semi-immobility, often moving in a wheelchair. In 2008, she gave an interview in which she stated that "I do not want to leave the country, or the city, or my house, or my bed."

Walsh has been considered a "living legend, cultural hero (and) crest of nearly every childhood".

What was written by María Elena configures the most important work of all time in its genre, comparable to Lewis Carroll's Alice or Pinocchio, a work that revolutionized the way to understand the relationship between poetry and childhood.

— Leopoldo Brizuela –

Walsh died of bone cancer at the age of 80 on 10 January 2011 at the Sanatorio La Trinidad in Buenos Aires after suffering a deterioration in her health. At the time of her death, she was surrounded by Mariana Facio, Sara's niece. Her remains were laid in state at the headquarters of the Sociedad Argentina de Autores y Compositores and buried in the association's pantheon at La Chacarita Cemetery. The novelist Alan Pauls referred to Walsh as "the Sarmiento of the second half of the twentieth century" and President Cristina Fernández de Kirchner, attending her funeral, described her as "an irreplaceable point of reference" whose value "transcends and sank deep into everyone's heart".

== Personal life ==
Walsh's partner from 1978 until her death in 2011 was Sara Facio, an Argentine photographer, best-known herself for having photographed, along with Alicia D'Amico, various cultural personalities, including Argentine writers Julio Cortázar and Alejandra Pizarnik.

== Composition, influences and style ==
Walsh defined herself as a formal poet who opted for traditional rhetoric. In this sense, she was influenced by figures such as María Granata, León Benarós and Jorge Luis Borges, who leaned toward a type of poetry with an elegiac tone that closely respected traditional forms. She preferred to express herself within rigid schemes rather than opting for free verse, which dispensed with rhyme. Rhyme often prevailed over meaning, giving the body of poems a playful intention. She strove to ensure that padding or forced rhyme would not be perceived in her verses, so her writing was characterized by its naturalness and simplicity. She despised any hint of renewal in the world of poetry, especially that which took the form of free verse, and instead saw herself as a disciple of the "Generation of the 1940s", which brought together the ideals of Romanticism.

Some sources indicate that Walsh was not an instinctive poet, but rather that writing was difficult for her: a poem would announce itself beforehand through a particular sensation, a kind of unconscious "thread tip". She could stimulate or force herself to write, but inspiration always appeared abruptly and unconsciously. She worked through various drafts until she managed to shape that raw material, which was never determined by her own will. Until 1947, she read almost exclusively classical Spanish and English poetry, including authors such as William Wordsworth, Lewis Carroll, Samuel Taylor Coleridge, William Shakespeare, Edgar Lee Masters and William Blake.

She was very rigorous when distinguishing between poetry and song, to which she assigned distinct and even opposing characteristics. When composing songs, the initial impulse was voluntary: she set out to write about a specific theme, rather than being surprised by it. In this regard, she stated that "poetry secretes its own gestation beyond the will", and that this involuntary domination was, according to the author, the reason she eventually abandoned poetry writing.

She was never concerned with expanding her audience of any kind and, in this sense, felt comfortable within certain structures of versification, although she associated poetry with a state of alienation and madness that was difficult to control. She told Gabriela Massuh that her shift from poetry to song "was essentially determined by the need to take advantage of the ease I had for versification, that faculty which consisted of feeling free within certain forms, even more rigid ones, such as song". Her inclination toward song was also motivated by her affinity for the stage and her admiration for the music hall and popular genres, as well as by an aversion to the pettiness she perceived in the literary world. Other factors, such as the absence of critics in children's literature and the opportunity to enter a field that had not yet been explored, led her to write for children. When composing for children, she returned to her own childhood, exchanging experiences with psychologists and pedagogues, and drawing on readings from the Encyclopædia Britannica, which she described as a "big mother". Her aim was to write within a fantastical context without rejecting the didactic element, while channeling fantasy within certain rules, and, as she told Jorge Aulicino, song meant "play, lightness, amusement, something that would take me away from that tragic sense of poetry, which ends in madness". She expressed something similar to Diana Bellessi and Martín Prieto: "Poetry is a dangerous and solitary game. Songs attract company. When I went to Europe and made a living singing and exploring popular poetry from here and there, I also recovered the habits of childhood and began writing from them."

In Paris, Walsh became fascinated with verbal play and the sonority of English and French poetics, as well as the sudden emergence of absurdity or double meanings that characterized them, often composed in that way as a reaction to specific historical or political events. From that moment on, the presence of historical reality remained as an undercurrent behind Walsh's verses.

According to her biographer Pujol, her texts "perfectly combined lyrics and melody. They could be easily hummed, they were memorable. They told micro-stories about little animals, everyday objects and old trades. Their morals reaffirmed modern values without ever becoming admonitory. With very simple strophic forms—stanzas of no more than four lines, or even just two, such as 'Milonga del hornero' and 'La familia polillal'—they invoked old couplets, both criollo and Spanish, but also referred, at least in intention, to 'nursery rhymes'...".

== Philosophy ==
=== Reflections on feminism ===
In the 1950s and 1960s, Walsh began reading Simone de Beauvoir and Jean Genet, two authors who deeply influenced her, and in particular, her reading of The Second Sex marked a key moment in her life to the point that she described it as "the bible—still unsurpassed—of feminism". She also highlighted feminist authors of the 1970s such as Kate Millett, Germaine Greer, Shulamith Firestone and Robin Morgan, all disciples of Beauvoir, and emphasized the writings of Virginia Woolf, Victoria Ocampo and Doris Lessing—whom she interviewed in 1981—which later gave rise to a multiplicity of journalistic articles, interviews and reflections in her different artistic facets that, although not categorized as such at the time, were feminist in nature. She admired Ocampo, who years later became her friend, and their epistolary exchange between 1960 and 1979 was later edited by Sara Facio. "Ocampo learned very early that the true cultural revolution is that undertaken by women. She witnessed the battles fought in the early decades of the century by the suffragists, whom she dared to praise and thank," she noted. In her article "Virginia Woolf y los secretos de la tribu femenina", Walsh wrote about the essay that obsessed her in her youth, as it did Ocampo: "A Room of One's Own is a metaphor for a mental space, a way of ordering ourselves internally and escaping the madness imposed on women (and the poor) by authoritarian and repressive discourse."

"Who said that feminism is not human integration? And who said that Victoria was not a feminist? A lady, so cultured, so beautiful, academic on top of that, cannot—rather must not—be a feminist (...) The word feminist frightens many people. Especially those who fear ridicule. In one book it is said that what remains of it is a caricature, and the feminist is seen as an aggressive old woman, embittered by her lack of suitors in youth, badly dressed, without feminine charm."

— Walsh on Victoria Ocampo, Feminismo y no-violencia (1979).

Walsh considered feminism to be "a cyclical phenomenon since the eighteenth century" that "appears sporadically, draws strength from its defeat and is once again suppressed", and also described it as "an entirely revisionist movement". Regarding the lack of continuity she perceived in the movement, she noted:

"It is as if women gathered strength and waited for some social and political circumstance in order to reappear. Each time feminism emerges, it provokes a fierce reaction that tends to silence it in a brutal way. In our country, the importation of books dealing with the subject was systematically prohibited. Articles on the matter that appeared in some publications could only achieve an almost rudimentary level of dissemination. Between 1970 and 1972, various consciousness-raising groups met here, from which the topic began to be discussed very slowly. But of course, in 1976 we had a coup that once again swept all that away. Even some women were threatened with a drastic 'enough of these jokes'. It always reappears timidly, grows a little until it is crushed again."

In the article "Infancia y bibliofobia" ("Childhood and bibliophobia"), published in Clarín in 1980, Walsh again reflected on feminism through irony:

"If our society were seriously concerned about children's reading habits, it would try not to continue fostering the existence of ignorant mothers. Women are firmly discouraged, by all means, from cultivating themselves in depth (...) A girl enthusiastic about a novel will be told not to 'spend so much time sitting doing nothing', but to help with domestic chores."

In an interview with Página/12 in 2008, she reflected on the hypocrisy of Argentine society regarding issues affecting women:

"Tell me how many people would not look unfavourably upon a woman who refuses motherhood and says: 'Being a mother and having children drives me mad'. The truth is, very few. And that is where it becomes clear that in our country there has been no feminism. Or if there has been, it has been a timid, weak version, self-contained out of fear, modesty or whatever. In countries where feminism has existed and exists, these issues are discussed much more frankly. And in Argentina, whether we like it or not, we are still far from lowering the flag of machismo."

Walsh was well known for her ironic and biting comments, which she often used when asked about women. On one occasion, she stated: "I never thought it necessary to add a moral at the end of a song or to tell children to behave well. I was never interested in putting myself in the role of a mother." In this regard, Sara Facio recalled that "María Elena always maintained that the first thing a woman had to do was achieve economic independence. From that came her freedom to do what she wanted with her life."

In her "Carta para una compatriota", published in the magazine Extra in 1973, she wrote:

"We feminists do not have hatred, we have anger. Hatred—with weapons, whether arms or money—is a male thing. We are fed up with hatred, even when it comes packaged in sublimations and compliments. We have not declared war, but we point out that it exists and has the age of our civilization. We defended ourselves as we could, sometimes with bad tactics; therefore it is better that it now appear as an open, clean war, the one we declare against all forms of machista arrogance. The guerrilla of cunning, retreat and comfort does nothing but reproduce series of 'sluggish' wives and castrating mothers."

She was also an activist in favour of the decriminalization of abortion, and even met with President Raúl Alfonsín to urge him to legislate it. In this regard, Eva Giberti stated: "Today, María Elena Walsh is not a figure recognized by feminists, and that seems unfair to me. I highlight her because she was an independent woman who confronted the dictatorship. And because she also asked President Raúl Alfonsín to legislate abortion, given what that meant at the time."

Among her feminist writings, the manifesto addressed to men entitled "Sepa usted por qué es machista", published in the magazine Humor in 1980, stands out, in which she described 24 reasons why a man may be classified as such.

=== Relationship with religion ===
Walsh told Gabriela Massuh that she felt a strong attraction to mysticism, which she regarded as a way of escaping reality and a means of pursuing what she called an "aesthetic act":

"Among all forms of confinement, the religious one was just another. In reality, it was a poetic or aesthetic search disguised as a compulsive desire to have faith and to enter into the protection of the Catholic Church. I elaborated a sort of literary anthology of that Church and chose what suited me most, what seemed to me more aesthetic, more protective."

In her youth, she used to attend spiritual retreats in a Benedictine abbey, attracted by Gregorian chant and asceticism, where she attended services and held conversations with the abbot. At the same time, she read Saint John of the Cross and Teresa of Ávila, and was fascinated by the Confessions of Augustine of Hippo, the Hymn to Charity of Saint Paul and the biography of Catherine of Siena.

In Paris, she regularly attended the Reformed Church of Saint-Séverin, impressed by its atmosphere of freedom and the tolerance of its sermons, and stated that "in that church I would have liked to baptize my child had I had one".

=== Studies on childhood ===
Walsh stated that she may have wanted to brighten her own childhood by reconstructing it, but that she never wished to return to it with nostalgia. In response to the myth of childhood as the happiest stage of life, she strongly opposed that idea:

"I have always opposed that absurd mythology of the happy childhood. I do not believe that any child is 'happy' as adults understand it. The child is a solitary being who has an enormous awareness of his deficiencies and impotence. That happiness of the myth of childhood is always retrospective. Never in my life have I heard any child say 'I am happy', and if you have ever heard it, it is the invention of an adult. I believe that the only happiness of children lies in play and, within this context, verbal and musical play are extremely important. All that mythology of the golden age, the purity, the innocence and incorruptibility of children has seemed to me an invention tinged with bad faith on the part of the adult who does not dare to seriously reconstruct his own childhood. Play is like an island in the middle of a child's life: that is happiness. When I write for children I try to recover that island of play, but without sentimentality or nostalgia. I never tried to recover my own childhood, but the abstract one, the present one, the one that keeps happening to me."

She maintained a lifelong commitment to early childhood education. In 1963, she studied psychoanalytic pedagogy related to childhood in Argentina together with Eva Giberti, Florencio Escardó and Arnaldo Rascovsky. At a congress of the World Organization for Early Childhood Education (OMEP), Walsh gave a lecture on poetry in early childhood, where she argued that it should be approached through play and free interaction, thus stimulating imagination. She also emphasized the importance of folk music, whether in Spanish or in English, and the so-called nursery rhymes, the basis of children's poetry for authors such as Lewis Carroll, author of Alice's Adventures in Wonderland.

Walsh believed that children are highly sensitive to play and can even become passionate about falsehood, but will never accept incoherence or lack of logic. On one occasion, she attended a play where actors dressed as mice appeared on stage. Suddenly, a child stood up angrily, turned around and shouted: "Mice without tails, mice without tails!" She later used this experience to point out that children accept that those characters are mice, but cannot tolerate that they lack tails.

Unlike Horacio Quiroga, who resonated with young audiences through his harsh and gruesome stories, Walsh never took an interest in atrocity or in including monsters in her works, although she acknowledged that they exert a strong fascination over children. She was also very critical of Walt Disney, not in his capacity as a documentarian but in his role as a cartoonist and creator for children. She described him as "coarse" and his artistic output as "vulgar" and "infinitely sadistic", adding that "his cartoons have a violence and a speed that unsettle children. That ferocious rhythm, which keeps destroying each character, is one of extreme unreality". She also stated that his work was "colonialist" and that his company "owned our imagination, not only children's imagination. In many places in our country—Mar del Plata, for example—an architecture of tiled roofs and neat little gardens has proliferated, very much inspired by Walt Disney". Walsh was harshly criticized for these statements and even received protest letters, a petition drive to remove her from a radio programme, and a request to ban her from entering the city of Rafaela.

=== Peronism and military governments ===
Walsh came from a Radical family that viewed the advance of conservative forces with alarm, although her father was a friend of Governor Manuel Fresco. She also noted that her father was a fervent republican and anti-Francoist, and later celebrated the victory of the Allies. She described the 1943 Argentine coup d'état as a "sinister plague" and recalled that in her student years she took part in groups that rebelled in classrooms by erasing slogans promoting military ideology, for which she was reprimanded and suspended. She also recalled strict school policies such as limits on makeup, mandatory hairstyles and clothing, and the introduction of religious instruction that altered the curriculum and school life.

After the rise of Juan Domingo Perón, Walsh began to perceive that behind official propaganda there was a genuine peaceful popular mobilization, and she acknowledged some social reforms, although she remained critical of the authoritarian climate. She described Peronism as "a phenomenon worthy of better evaluation" but also "the never well-told love story between a people and a couple".

"Peronism is a very paradoxical movement… It called elections, but at the same time imprisoned its main opponent, Ricardo Balbín. Since I was fifteen, the country was divided into two camps, and one had to take a side. As a member of the 'educated class', I endured Peronism against my will."

She also remarked that Perón was "the first ruler who spoke to the people, to workers, with a plain, understandable and affectionate language… He could improvise on certain topics with a clarity that no later politician had". She compared Eva Perón to a "fairy godmother" and noted that "the dispossessed felt that she would give them heaven on earth". She described Eva's funeral in 1952 as "a moving spectacle" and "one of the most unforgettable experiences of my life".

After Perón's overthrow in the Revolución Libertadora, Walsh returned to Argentina and initially felt relief, describing a climate of freedom. However, she later reassessed the period, recognizing the lasting impact of Peronist public works and social policies.

The return of Perón to Argentina, and his subsequent victory for a third term, were "hopeful" times for Walsh; however, after his death in 1974, she stated that "the country fell into a progressive abyss that has now become a prison at the bottom of the sea, with the texture of hell disguised by trips to Miami and the relentless propaganda that we are all 'right and human'", in reference to the National Reorganization Process. During the period from 1976 to 1982, Walsh stopped composing and writing because, in her own words, she felt that "the show had ended" and that "there was no right to be festive".

== Legacy ==
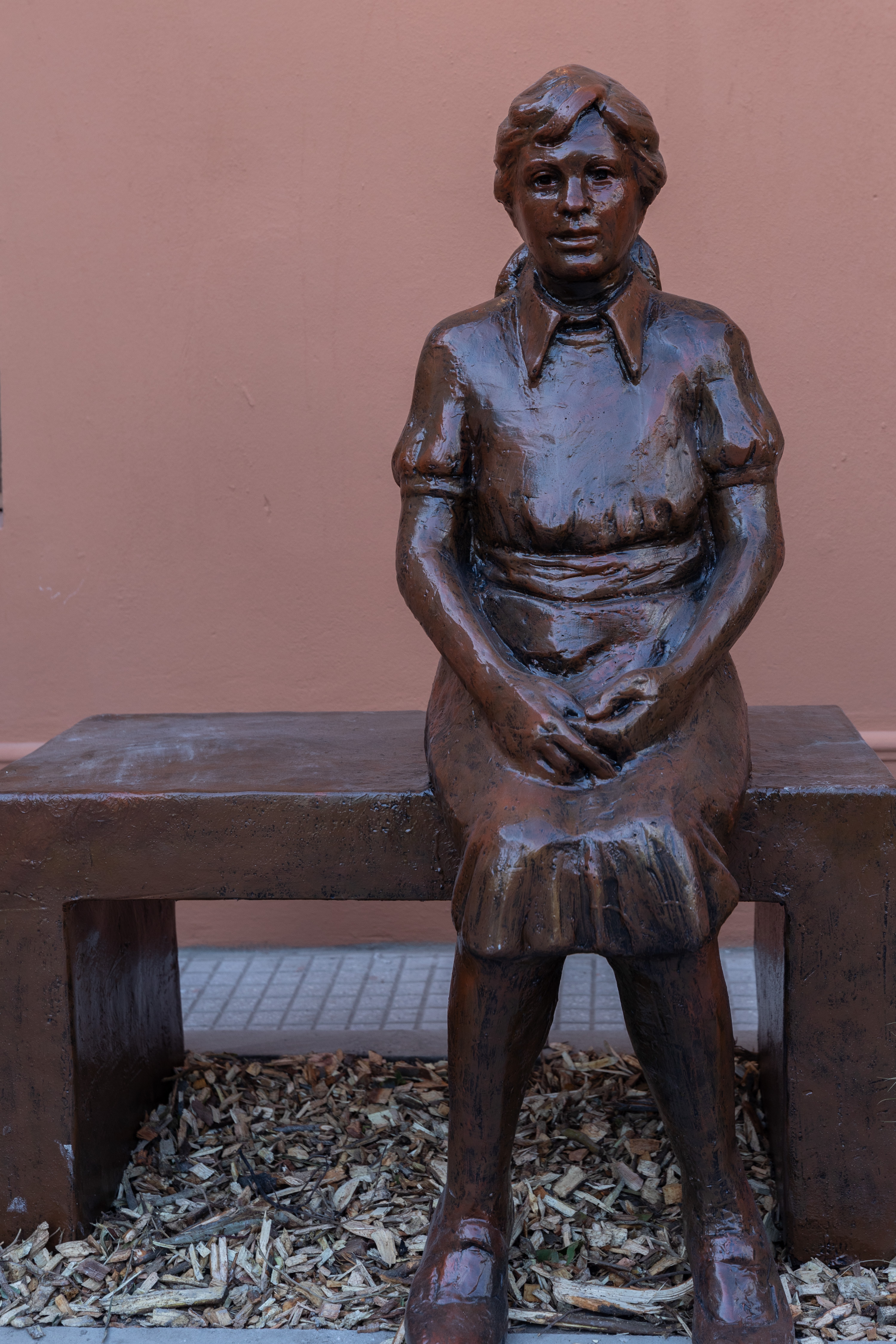
Statue of Walsh at the María Elena Walsh House Museum.

Her biographer Sergio Pujol noted that few authors enjoyed such widespread approval over time and achieved such rapid popular impact. He also referred to the transgressive nature of her work, noting that each time she made an artistic shift—from poetry to folklore, and from children's repertoire to that for adults—even when she immersed herself in genres she did not fully master, she achieved an even greater consecration than before. Walsh maintained a high level of prominence in Argentine cultural life over five decades. Angélica Gorodischer highlighted the universal spirit of her work: "She spoke about what all poets speak about. Narrators too. And mathematicians and philosophers and people walking down the street", while Jorge Aulicino of Ñ commented that she was "a splendid literary poet, trained in traditional Spanish poetry and later marked by changes in language and rhythms in the mid-20th century". In Rolling Stone, Claudio Kleiman emphasized Walsh's enormous ability to capture the world's folk traditions and uniquely create parallel universes.

In a similar analysis, Rodrigo Fresán wrote that it is "impossible not to read that chapter of Alicia en el país de las maravillas with 'Canción para tomar el té' playing in the background or, now, to listen to Regina Spektor and think that, yes, 'On the Radio' or 'Eat' could well be lost tracks from 'Canciones de Tutú Marambá' or 'Cuentopos'". Among the artists who popularized Walsh's songbook are the Cuarteto Zupay, Lito Vitale, Susana Rinaldi, Julia Zenko, Pedro Aznar, Luis Aguilé, Mercedes Sosa, Jairo, Sandra Mihanovich, Rosa León and Joan Manuel Serrat. Susana Itzcovich, a specialist in children's literature, emphasized that, despite her many followers, none of them matched her "masterful" writing, even if they "drew from her nonsense, her absurdity and her poetics".

As a thinker and critical observer of her time, her commitment to early childhood education led her to give lectures on the importance of poetry as a stimulus for imagination in early childhood, and her defense of equal opportunities and condemnation of discrimination led her to become an icon of feminism. For writer María Teresa Andruetto, Walsh represented a "turning point" in children's literature: "There is a before and after in relation to literature-school, literature-childhood and literature-play. But she is many other things: gender issues and feminism were very strong in her work at a time when none of that was on the agenda. She was a pioneer."

Her work often contained an underlying political message, as in the song "El país del Nomeacuerdo", which was later used as the main theme of the film The Official Story, winner of the Academy Award for Best Foreign Language Film in 1985.

In 2018, at the initiative of Sara Facio, the María Elena Walsh Foundation was created, aimed at preserving and promoting the singer's literary and musical work, as well as carrying out cultural activities and competitions to encourage emerging artists. In 2023, the María Elena Walsh House Museum was inaugurated, a cultural space open to the community located in the home where Walsh lived during her early years. In 2025, in an event organized by the Instituto Cervantes and the Walsh-Facio Foundation, a joint tribute was held that included the reception and storage of various culturally valuable objects in the Caja de las Letras. For deposit in boxes 1312 and 1313, for example, editions of María Elena Walsh's poetic work and Sara Facio's photographic work were selected.

== Bibliography ==
=== Books ===
Walsh published her first poem at the age of 15, in El Hogar magazine of Argentina. Her favorite audience was children, for whom she wrote more than 40 books. The following list includes mainly complete books but also some long newspaper articles.

Books for adults

- Otoño imperdonable (1947) – edited by Walsh at 17
- Apenas Viaje (poems) (1948)
- Baladas con Ángel (poems) (1951) with Ángel Bonomini
- Casi Milagro (poems) (1958)
- Hecho a Mano (poems) (1965)
- Juguemos en el mundo (poems) (1971)
- La Sirena y el Capitán - 1974 ("The Mermaid and the Captain")
- Cancionero contra el Mal de Ojo (poems) (1976)
- Los Poemas (1982)
- Novios de Antaño (novel) (1990)
- Desventuras en el País-Jardín-de-Infantes (1993) ^{(*)} ("Misfortunes in Kindergarten-Country")
- Hotel Pioho's Palace (2002)
- Fantasmas en el Parque (2008)

Books for children

- La Mona Jacinta (1960)
- La Familia Polillal (1960)
- Tutú Marambá (1960)
- Circo de Bichos (1961)
- Tres Morrongos (1961)
- El Reino del Revés (poems and songs) (1965)
- Zoo Loco (1965)
- Cuentopos de Gulubú (1966)
- Dailán Kifki (novel) (1966)
- Versos para Cebollitas (1966)
- Versos Folklóricos para Cebollitas (1967)
- Aire Libre (school book) (1967)
- Versos Tradicionales para Cebollitas (1967)
- El Diablo Inglés (short stories) (1970)
- Angelito (1974)
- El País de la Geometría (1974)
- Chaucha y Palito (short stories) (1977)
- Veo Veo (1984)
- Bisa Vuela (1985)
- Los Glegos (1987)
- La Nube Traicionera (1989)

Notes:

- ^{(*)} This book reprinted her famous letter against censorship in Argentina, originally published by Clarín newspaper on 16 August 1979.

Due to the publication of that article, Walsh herself would be censored by the Military Government of Argentina.

=== Discography ===
Walsh recorded many albums with songs for children and for adults too. Her first albums were strongly influenced by Argentine folklore, working with composer and singer Leda Valladares. The album Canciones para Mí was her first release as a soloist, containing the songs Canción de Tomar el Té and Manuelita la tortuga (which had been previously edited on an EP). This would become Walsh's best-known song.

as "Leda y María", with Leda Valladares

- Chant d'Argentine (1954)
- Souns le Ciel de l'Argentine (1955)
- Entre Valles y Quebradas Vol. 1 & 2 (1957)
- Canciones del Tiempo de Maricastaña (1958)
- Leda y María Cantan Villancicos (EP) (1959)
- Canciones de Tutú Marambá (EP) (1960) ^{6}

as "María Elena Walsh"

- Canciones para Mirar (with Leda Valladares) (1962) ^{1}
- Doña Disparate y Bambuco (EP) (with Leda Valladares) (1962)
- Navidad para los Chicos (EP) (with Leda Valladares) (1963)
- Canciones para Mí (1963) ^{2}
- Canciones para Mirar (1964)
- El País de Nomeacuerdo (1966) ^{3}
- El País de la Navidad (1968) ("The Country of Christmas")
- Cuentopos (1968)
- Juguemos en el Mundo (1968)
- Cuentopos para el Recreo (1969)
- Juguemos en el Mundo II (1969) ^{4}
- El Sol no tiene Bolsillos (1971)
- Como la Cigarra (1973) ^{5}
- El Buen Modo (1975)
- De Puño y Letra (1976)

Notes:

- ^{1} Contains the classics El Reino del Revés (whose previous version had been released on Canciones de Tutú Marambá), Canción del Jardinero, La Vaca Estudiosa, La Mona Jacinta.
- ^{2} This was Walsh's first album as a soloist, with the hits Canción de tomar el té, Manuelita la tortuga, El twist del Mono Liso.
- ^{3} Includes the songs la Reina Batata, Canción del Jacarandá (co-written with Palito Ortega).
- ^{4} After many years of recording LP with songs for children, Walsh wrote and recorded an album for adult audiences.
- ^{5} The song Como la Cigarra became a huge hit. The album also contains other successful songs like Carta de un León a Otro, with strong politic references.

== Bibliography ==
Books

- Blanco Pazos, Roberto; Clemente, Raúl (2008). Diccionario de Actrices del Cine Argentino Segunda Edición (1933–1997) (2nd ed.). Argentina: Corregidor. ISBN 978-950-05-1787-4.
- Dujovne, Alicia (1982). María Elena Walsh. Madrid: Jucar. ISBN 9788433420404.
- Massuh, Gabriela (2017). Nací para ser breve [I was born to be brief]. Argentina: Sudamericana. ISBN 978-950-07-5944-1.
- Pujol, Sergio (2011). Como la cigarra: biografía de María Elena Walsh [Like the cicada: biography of María Elena Walsh] (1st ed.). Argentina: Emecé. ISBN 978-950-04-3427-0.
- Ramaglia, Dante; Hintze, Gloria; Ferreira, Florencia (2006). Sujetos, discursos y memoria histórica en América Latina [Subjects, discourses and historical memory in Latin America]. Centro de Estudios Trasandinos y Latinoamericanos. ISBN 9789879441213.
- Walsh, María Elena (1993). Desventuras en el País Jardín-de Infantes [Misadventures in kindergarten country]. Buenos Aires: Sudamericana. ISBN 9789500708753.
- Walsh, María Elena (2014). Poemas y canciones [Poems and songs] (1st ed.). Argentina: Alfaguara. ISBN 978-987-04-3251-7.

Publications and critical studies

- Walsh, María Elena (January 1949). "Otoño imperdonable" [Unforgivable autumn] (PDF). Suplemento Anales de Educación Común. Revista de Educación (6).
- Garralón, Ana (2004). "María Elena Walsh, o El discreto encanto de la tenacidad" [María Elena Walsh, or the discreet charm of tenacity]. Alicante: Biblioteca Virtual Miguel de Cervantes.
