= María Granata =

Argentine author (1920–2026)

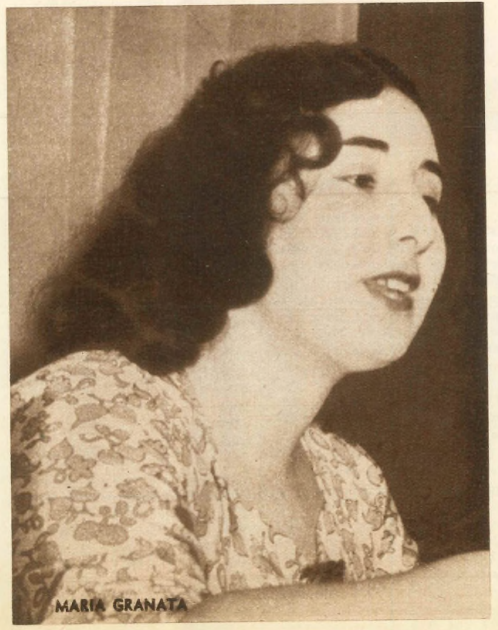
- Born: 3 September 1920; Buenos Aires, Argentine
- Died: 12 June 2026 (aged 105)
- Occupations: Author; poet
- Years active: 1942–2026

María Granata (3 September 1920 – 12 June 2026) was an Argentine author and poet.

== Life and career ==
Granata was born on 3 September 1920, in the Balvanera neighborhood of the city of Buenos Aires. She began writing as a very young girl, encouraged by her father, an Italian doctor who introduced her to Leopardi 's poetry and who died when she was 11 years old. She recounts that it was during her adolescence when she read the most and that later the fervent "re-readings" attracted her the most and that since then she was subjugated by Quevedo, San Juan de la Cruz, Leopardi, Walt Whitman and, in narrative, Dostoevsky, Faulkner and Juan Rulfo.

In 1942, at the age of 21, a few months after settling in the San Vicente District, a semi-rural area 45 kilometers from Buenos Aires, where she continued to live, the publishing house "Conducta", directed by Leónidas Barletta, published her first book on poetry Umbral de tierra, for which she was awarded the Municipal Prize and the Martín Fierro Prize. The work, in which some critics saw the influence of Leopoldo Lugones and Horacio Rega Molina while others "rescued the song of a girl who was emotionally poured out before the conspiracy of beings animated or not, with expressive fullness and lyrical nobility."

Her next work, also of poems, was Death of the Adolescent (1946), chosen that year by the Book of the Month Club. In 1952 she published Corazón cavado which prompted the critic Luis Soler Cañas to write. Other of her poetic works are Human Color (1966) and Los tumultos (1974). Regarding the latter, she says that she had always felt the drama of the family clan destined to dismember and that suddenly, without having expressly proposed it, one day she found herself giving literary form to the subject.

In her novels she approaches the imaginative and baroque of models such as those of García Márquez . The best known, Los viernes de la eternidad ( 1971), earned her the Emecé Award and the Argentine National Literature Award. Granata says that she had never thought of writing a novel until one morning when the character of the ghost who comes looking for his wife, the scene with the nails and the ending suddenly occurred to her; that same afternoon she began to write it and continued it for eleven months. Other novels are The Getaway, The Jubilant Extermination (1979) and The Sun of the Times.

Granata turned 100 in September 2020, and died on 12 June 2026, at the age of 105.
