= Ángel Bonomini =

Argentine writer (1929-1994)

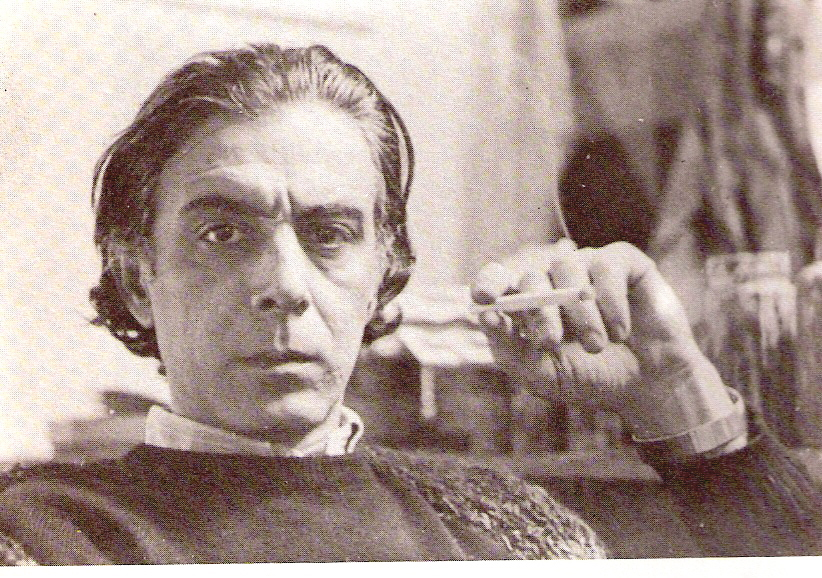
- Born: 13 October 1929; Buenos Aires, Argentina
- Died: 13 May 1994 (aged 64)
- Spouse: Vechy Logioio

Ángel Bonomini (13 October 1929 – 13 May 1994) was an Argentine short story writer, poet, and translator, best known for his novella The Novices of Lerna.

== Biography ==
Bonomini was born in Buenos Aires on 13 October 1929. At the age of 18, he published his first collection of poetry, Primera enunciación, in the magazine Sur. In 1952, alongside María Elena Walsh, his then-girlfriend, he published the poetry collection Argumento del enamorado. Báladas con Ángel. From 1955 to 1961, he was an editor of LIFE magazine, where he translated texts into Spanish. He was an art critic for the Argentine monthly Panorama between 1968 and 1970, and for La Nación between 1970 and 1978.

His most well-known story is The Novices of Lerna, published in 1972 in a short story collection of the same name, which was praised by Borges and Bioy Casares. He won a Fulbright Grant in 1974 and the Konex Award in 1984 and 1994.

Despite praise during his lifetime, Bonomini was mostly forgotten after his death.

== Works ==
During his lifetime, Bonomini wrote 90 short stories and 8 poem anthologies.

His early works were in the neoromantic style, however, he distanced himself from the style later on. Similarities to Borges have been noted in his work. His later work dealt with the metaphysical and the mystical, and is described as fantastical literature. He influenced the work of Alberto Manguel.

Several of his stories were translated and published in English in 1989, in Italian in 1982, 1983, 1989, and 1997; and in German in 1974 and 1989. In 2004, his story Lentos Elefantes de Milan was published in French. In 2015, the Spanish publishing house Editorial Pre-Textos published an edited anthology of his poetry collection Torres para el silencio y otros poemas; in 2017, Pre-Textos published a complete anthology of his short stories titled Todos parecían soñar in 2017, under the supervision of Alberto Manguel.

In 2024, an English translation by Jordan Landsman of several of his short stories, including The Novices of Lerna, was published. The collection received mostly positive reviews. Natasha Wimmer praised The Novices of Lerna and the "timeless spirit" of his stories, but felt that other stories in the collection were dated. Kirkus Reviews called the collection "A beguiling blend of the cerebral and the visceral." Tobias Carroll, writing for Reactor Magazine, called the collection "welcome addition to Argentinian literature in translation." One review from Asymptote Journal praised his lyrical style of writing. John Self of The Telegraph praised The Novices of Lerna as a "bizarre and brilliant" novella, and Stuart Evers, writing for The Spectator, gave a more mixed review, criticizing the novella for not fully exploring the themes presented, but praising it as a "powerful story...hauntingly intelligent and psychically unnerving".
