= Leda Valladares =

Argentine musician (1919–2012)

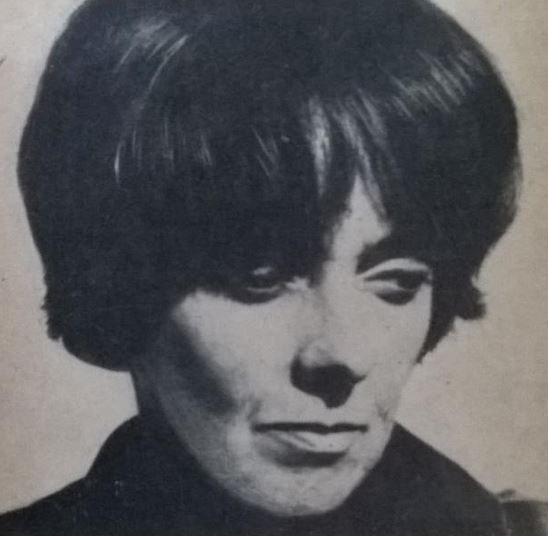
- Valladares in 1971
- Born: Leda Nery Valladares Frías; 21 December 1919; San Miguel de Tucumán, Argentina
- Died: 13 July 2012 (aged 92); Buenos Aires, Argentina
- Occupations: Singer; songwriter; musicologist; folklorist
- Years active: 1940–1999

Leda Valladares (21 December 1919 – 13 July 2012) was an Argentine singer, songwriter, musicologist, folklorist, and poet. Born in San Miguel de Tucumán in northern Argentina, she grew up surrounded by both classical European music and the folk music of the Amerindian people living in the area. From a young age she studied piano and in her teens began a band with her brother that explored folk music, jazz, and blues. She published works of poetry throughout her life. Although she began her university studies at the National University of Tucumán as an English major, after a year she changed course and studied philosophy and education, graduating in 1948. Her schooling was interrupted by a foray into the study of music at the Academy of Fine Art and in independent research among those who performed traditional folk music.

Upon graduation, Valladares taught briefly before moving to Paris in the early 1950s and forming a music duo with María Elena Walsh. They sang traditional Argentine folk music for four years in cafés and cabarets. They returned to Argentina after the 1956 Liberating Revolution had removed Juan Perón from office. There was little appreciation of folk music in Argentina at the time, and though they continued to perform and release albums, their audiences were limited. The two women split up in 1962 and Valladares embarked on a career documenting the folk music traditions of Argentina. Her work between 1960 and 1974 produced a documentary series of albums, Mapa musical de la argentina (Musical Map of Argentina), which recorded and preserved folk music throughout the country's varied regions.

From the early 1970s, Valladares built bridges with popular musicians, playing other styles, like rock, in an effort to stop the commercialization of music. When the Argentine dictatorship ended in 1983, she joined the Movement for the Reconstruction and Development of National Culture and worked with other musicians to present and preserve the country's musical heritage. Her last large work América en Cueros (America in Leather, 1992) presented more than 400 folk songs from throughout the Americas and earned her recognition as a member of honor of UNESCO. She was recognized with a Konex Award in 1984, 1994, and 2005, and was the first recipient of the National Prize for Ethnology and Folklore, given in 1996.

== Early life and influences ==
Leda Nery Valladares Frías was born on 21 December 1919 in San Miguel de Tucumán, Argentina, to Aurora Frías and Fermín Valladares. Her mother's ancestors came from a patrician family of Santiago del Estero Province and included Félix Ignacio Frías and his son, Félix Frías. Her father was a writer, who published two books and was an amateur singer and poet. As Tucumán was a border region, besides European classical music, Valladares was exposed to the folk music of the Amerindian peoples living in the Calchaquí Valleys. Both parents enjoyed singing and often hosted musical evenings. From a young age, Valladares studied piano, initially with Sarah Carreras.

Valladares and her brother, Rolando "Chivo", began studying jazz and blues music. As teenagers, they formed a group called Fijos (Folkloric, Intuitive, Jazz, Original, and Surreal) made up of Adolfo Abalos, Manuel Gómez Carrillo, Gustavo "Cuchi" Leguizamón, Enrique "Mono" Villegas, Rodrigo Montero, and Lucía Claudia Bolognini Míguez, later known as Lois Blue. Valladares performed under the pseudonym Ann Kay. From well-to-do families, by performing together they sought to rebel against elite musical tastes. Valladares enrolled in the first class of the newly created National University of Tucumán in 1939, as an English major. After one year, she changed her area of study to philosophy and pedagogy. Valladares read European literature voraciously, focusing on French and Spanish symbolism and surrealism. She was also interested in avant-garde poetry and studied German philosophers, including Franz Brentano, Immanuel Kant, and Oswald Spengler.

== Career ==
=== Poetry and later education (1940–1950) ===
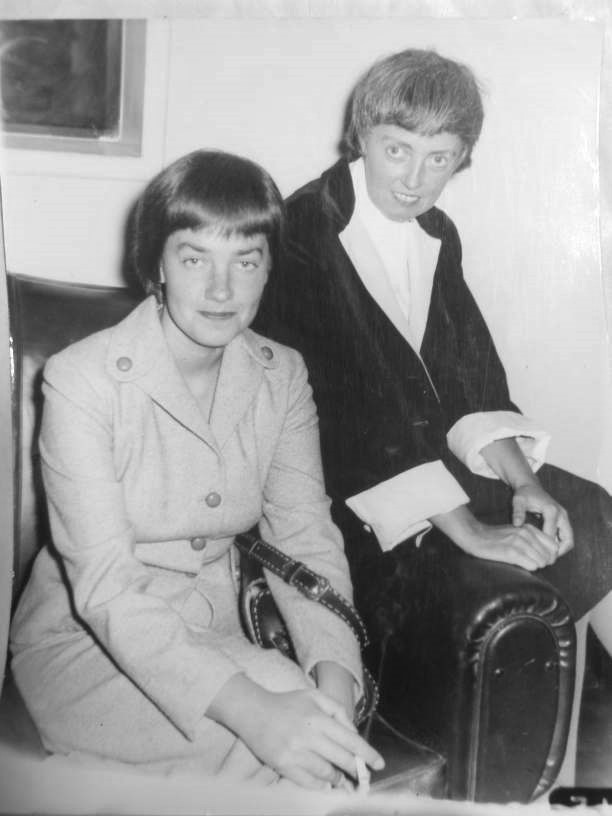
Valladares (right) and Walsh, 1956

Valladares began publishing poems in regional magazines such as El mar (The Sea) in 1940 and the following year in La pirámide (The Pyramid). She presented seven poems in the inaugural issue of Cántico (1940), and continued to publish books of poetry throughout her life. She became friends with Olga Orozco and met Alejandra Pizarnik through that association. (Note: According to Valladares' childhood friend Lucía Piossek, who was interviewed by academic Fabiola Orquera in 2014 and 2015, both Valladares and Pizarnik were bisexual, though Valladares' predominant relationships were lesbian. Though homosexuality was rarely open at the time, people in Valladares' home town knew of her orientation, but it was seen as simply part of her artistic eccentricity.) In 1941, while attending Carnival festivities in Cafayate, she first encountered Baguala, the folkloric style of music from the Province of Salta. She gave up her philosophy studies and in 1943 attended classes at the Academia de Bellas Artes de la Provincia (Academy of Fine Arts of the Province). She learned to play the clarinet and also sang in a women's quartet specializing in Renaissance music. After a year, she quit, because she did not feel able to express herself in the curriculum's classical styles. She embarked on a journey and paid her own way to study the traditional music of La Rioja Province, San Fernando del Valle de Catamarca, and San Salvador de Jujuy.

On successfully completing her studies in philosophy and education in 1948, Valladares traveled to Europe with her mother and a friend, Nelly García Alvarez. On their return journey, when their ship docked at Bahia, Brazil, she watched a Macumba ceremony and saw a commonality in the drumming rhythms with the purity of the music of baguala—folk music originating from north-east Argentina. She interrupted her trip home and instead went to Caracas to study Afro-Venezuelan music. Upon her return to Tucumán, Valladares read Otoño Imperdonable (Unforgivable Autumn), a book of poems, and began a correspondence with the author, María Elena Walsh. Valladares accepted a position and began teaching in Costa Rica in 1950. Deciding to move together to Paris, she traveled to Panama in 1952, where Walsh met her to complete their journey. During the two months they spent aboard the ship, Valladares taught Walsh, who did not have a musical background, the folk songs and rhythms she knew.

=== Partnership with María Elena Walsh (1952–1962) ===
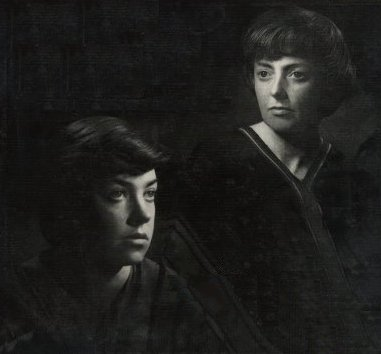
Leda y María, from the album cover of "Entre valles y quebradas", 1957

Arriving in Paris, Valladares and Walsh established a gathering place in their apartment and put together a repertoire which included various folk music styles from Argentina. They formed a duet, Leda y María (Leda and Maria), and began performing music based on traditional bagualas, chacareras, vidalas, and zambas. They sang in the auditorium of the Sorbonne, in intellectual cafés like l'Écluse, and in cabarets like the Crazy Horse. They selected places frequented by Spanish exiles, who had fled from the Spanish Civil War, and other Europeans, as many Argentines in France felt that they were making their country look unsophisticated by their focus on folk music. They performed for celebrities including Charlie Chaplin and Pablo Picasso, and for José Luis Cano and his circle of friends. They were lovers, although neither publicly acknowledged it because of the social taboos towards same-sex relationships at the time. However, their lesbian partnership was known and Walsh would later acknowledge it. (Note: By the time Walsh made her public acknowledgement in 2008, Valladares was living a private life due to Alzheimer's disease.)

The duo began recording albums; the first Chants d'Argentine (Songs of Argentina) was released in 1954. A year later, they recorded Sous le ciel de l'Argentine (Under the Sky of Argentina). They also made a test recording for Folkways Records in 1955. Though American ethnomusicologist, Alan Lomax, acknowledged the quality of their music, he refused to produce it, because as members of the upper classes, their songs were not authentic. In 1956, after a coup d'état removed Juan Perón from office, Valladares and Walsh decided to return to Argentina. Almost immediately, they scheduled a lecture, El folklore como tarea poética (Folklore as a Poetic Task), accompanied by some of their songs at the Caja Popular de Ahorros in Tucumán. Having experienced a celebration of Argentine folk songs in Paris, they recognized that there was not the same appreciation in their homeland. Until they broke up as a couple in 1962, after the Tucumán presentation, their performances were limited to intellectual venues.

=== Ethnography, musicology (1959–1999) ===
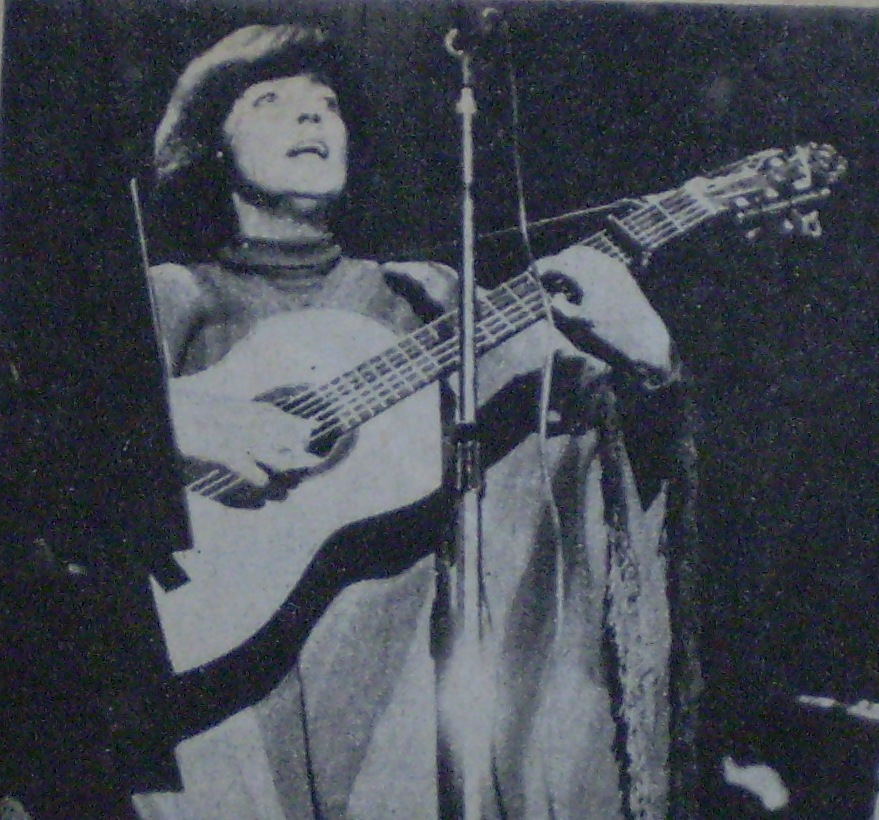
Valladares performing in 1970

In 1959, Valladares received a scholarship from the National Endowment of the Arts to collect folk music and map the locations of Argentine musical heritage. She bought a recorder and began traveling to collect music from various provinces. The result was a documentary series of albums released from 1960 to 1974 as the Mapa musical de la argentina (Musical Map of Argentina), directed by Litto Nebbia on Melopea Records. (Note: It is unclear how many volumes made up the original releases. One article reports twelve volumes, another eleven volumes, while still others say nine. The re-release of the series in 2001 by Discos del Rojas and Melopea contained eight volumes.) In 1966, Jorge Prelorán, a documentary filmmaker, approached her to advise both him and folklorist Augusto Raúl Cortazar on the musical portion of their film Relevamiento cinematográfico de expresiones folklóricas argentinas (Cinematographic Survey of Argentine Folkloric Expressions). Their collaboration led to a series of short films, including Hermógenes Cayo and Valle Fértil (Fertile Valley) produced jointly with the National University of Tucumán.

In 1969, Valladares began performing as a soloist at educational institutions using a traditional two-sided hand drum, known as the caja coplera (often simply called caja). She recruited groups of students to join her in her music making. At one point in the 1970s, she had over 30,000 students participating with her. Dressed in a poncho, she became a symbol of a countercultural movement against the commercialization of music that moved it away from its spiritual roots, bringing her into contact with both rock and classical musicians. She assisted Anastasio Quiroga in creating the album Pastor de cabras (Goat Herder), which led to a collaboration in their production of Folklore de rancho y rascacielos (Folklore of the Ranch and Skyscraper) at the Teatro General San Martín of Buenos Aires, with Susana Lago and José Luis Castiñeira in 1971. This led to a collaboration with Lago and her quartet Cabrakán, which included Beatriz Arágor, Roberto Catarineau, and Jorge Fernández, and later in a 1972 performance at Tucumán with Lago, Quiroga and Henry Nelson. Around 1974, she began a collaboration with Arco Iris, led by Gustavo Santaolalla, and with the Chilean band Los Jaivas.

Artists and their works were suppressed during the authoritarian military dictatorship, which ruled Argentina between 1976 and 1983. With the end of the regime and a return to democratic rule in the early 1980s, Valladares joined other musicians in the Movement for the Reconstruction and Development of National Culture. They brought together well-known singers for a series of festivals to celebrate the musical heritage of Argentina. Following her earlier map of music, she collaborated with León Gieco and Santaolalla in their production of De Ushuaia a La Quiaca (From Usuahia to La Quiaca) in 1985. Valladares was honored in 1984, 1994, and 2005 with the Konex Award, a national Argentine prize awarded to distinguished professionals, whose work is of cultural significance. Her last major work, América en Cueros (America in Leather, 1992) brought together more than 400 folk songs from throughout the Americas. It was recognized by UNESCO, which designated her as a "member of honor". For her work in mapping Argentina's musical heritage, Valladares was honored as the inaugural recipient of the National Prize for Ethnology and Folklore in 1996. Valladares retired from public life in 1999 because of complications from Alzheimer's disease.

== Death and legacy ==
Valladares died on 13 July 2012 in Buenos Aires. In 2019, celebrations for the centennial of her birth were held throughout Argentina and the Día Nacional del Canto con Caja (National Day of Singing with a Hand Drum) was proposed to honor her work in preserving the folk traditions of Argentina. She is revered as a significant figure in influencing the development of many Argentine musicians and for her preservation of Argentina's cultural and musical heritage.

== Selected works ==
=== Poetry ===
- Fryda Schultz de Mantovani; Valladares, Leda; Duncan, Elena (1943). La estrella en la rosa; poemas (in Spanish). La Plata, Argentina. OCLC 31424432.
- Valladares, Leda (1944). Se llaman llanto o abismo: poemas (in Spanish). Tucumán, Argentina. OCLC 28769499.
- Valladares, Leda; Anderson Imbert, Enrique (1954). Yacencia (in Spanish). Mexico City: Cuadernos Americanos. OCLC 25360692.
- Valladares, Leda (1964). Mutapetes: arranques de una lapicera (in Spanish). Buenos Aires: Editorial Ledares. OCLC 977586199.
- Valladares, Leda (1972). Camalma; poemas y otros sondajes (in Spanish). Buenos Aires: Editorial Rodolfo Alonso. OCLC 1224516.
- Valladares, Leda (1978). Autopresentación (in Spanish). Tucumán, Argentina: Centro de Historia y Pensamiento Argentinos, Universidad Nacional de Tucumán, Facultad de Filosofía y Letras. OCLC 12718087.

=== Discography of Leda y María ===
- 1954: Chants d’Argentine (Le Chant du Monde LDY-M-4021).
- 1955: Sous le ciel de l’Argentine [Bajo los cielos de la Argentina] (London International FS 123619/WB 9113).
- 1957: Entre valles y quebradas, vol. 1 & 2 (Disc Jockey Estrellas 10071, 15052).
- 1958: Canciones del tiempo de Maricastaña (Disc Jockey 77076).
- 1959: Leda y María cantan villancicos (EP) (Disc Jockey TD 1007).
- 1960: Canciones de Tutú Marambá (EP) (Disco Plin s/n)
- 1962: Canciones para mirar (Disco Plin 102).
- 1962: Doña Disparate y Bambuco (EP) (Disco Plin 103).
- 1963: Navidad para los chicos (EP) (Abril Fonorama Bolsillitos 502).

=== Other works ===
- 1964: El reñidero musical score for the 1962 play by Sergio De Cecco.
- 1960–1974: Mapa musical de la argentina, Melopea Records directed by Litto Nebbia (re-released in 2001 by Discos del Rojas and Melopea):
  - vol. 1: Documental folklórico de la Quebrada de Humahuaca.
  - vol. 2: Documental folklórico de Tucumán: Cantores de patio y de los valles.
  - vol. 3: La montaña va a la escuela.
  - vol. 4: Manantiales del Canto Argentina en cerros y llanos.
  - vol. 5: Documental folklórico de Cuyo.
  - vol. 6: Documental folklórico de Salta.
  - vol. 7: Documental folklórico de Santiago del Estero.
  - vol. 8: Documental folklórico de la Provincia de Buenos Aires.
- 1968: Canticuento – Seleccion de música infantil.
- 1969: Pastor de cabras with Anastasio Quiroga.
- 1971: Folklore de rancho y rascacielos with Anastasio Quiroga, Susana Lago and José Luis Castiñeira de Dios at the Teatro General San Martín.
- 1985: Igual rumbo with Margot Loyola.
- 1989: Grito en el cielo.
- 1990: Grito en el cielo II.
- 1992: América en cueros.
