= Jorge Aulicino =

Argentinian journalist (1949–2025)

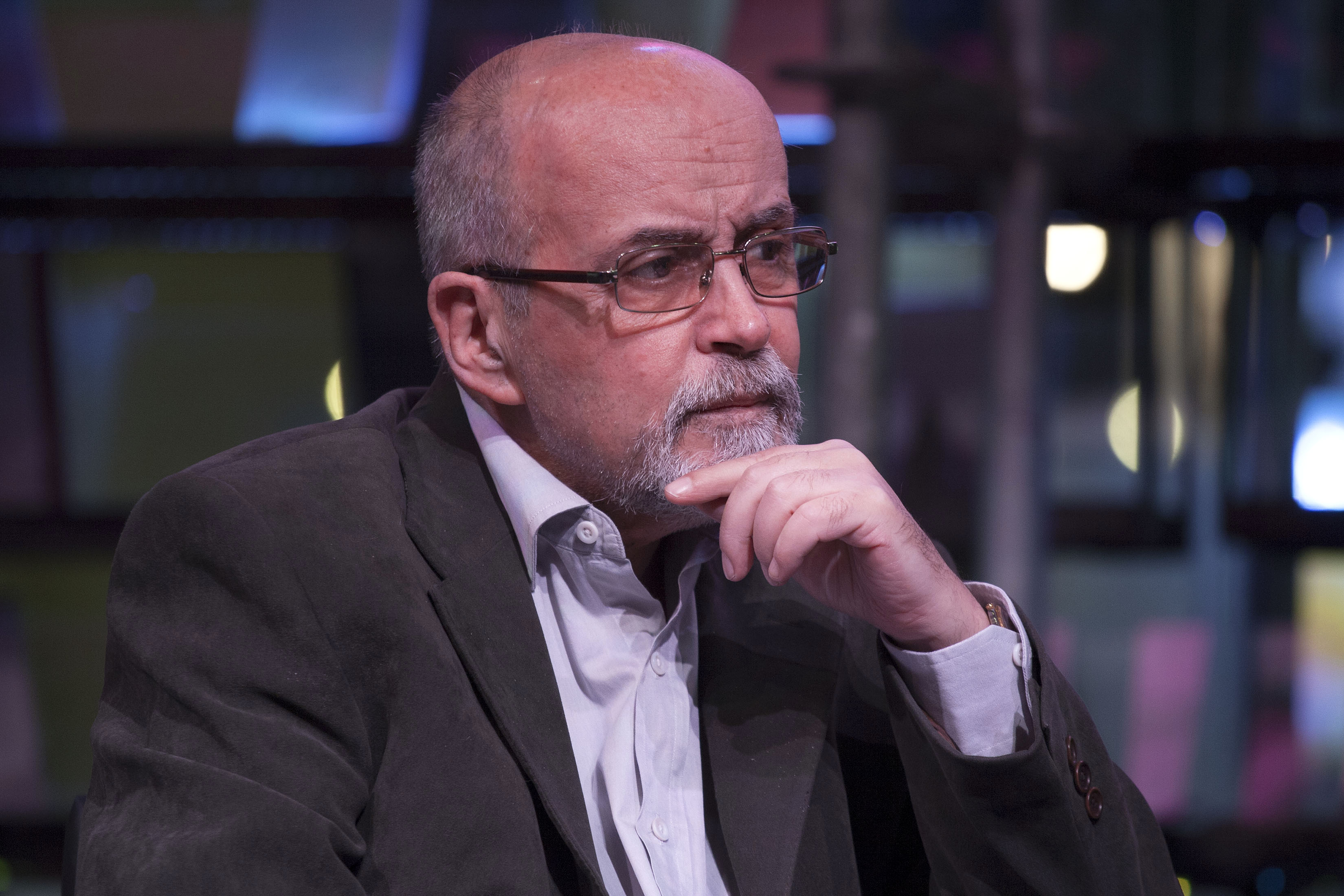
Aulicino in 2015

Jorge Ricardo Aulicino (Spanish: [ˈxoɾxe riˈkaɾðo auliˈsino]; August 11, 1949 – July 21, 2025) was an Argentine poet, translator and journalist.

== Life and career ==
Aulicino was born in Buenos Aires on August 11, 1949. He trained at the Mario Jorge De Lellis literary workshop along with poets and storytellers such as Daniel Freidemberg, Marcelo Cohen, Irene Gruss, Rubén Reches, Alicia Genovese, Leonor García Hernando, Lucina Álvarez and Jorge Asís. In 2017 he was awarded a Konex Diploma of Merit for literary journalism.

Throughout his career, he focused on left-wing political journalism, working with newspapers such as La Calle, and La Tarde.

He gave journalism workshops at the University of Buenos Aires.

Aulicino died in Buenos Aires on July 21, 2025, at the age of 75.
