= Eva Giberti =

Argentine psychologist (1929–2025)

Eva Giberti (May 21, 1929 – December 14, 2025) was an Argentine psychologist and academic.

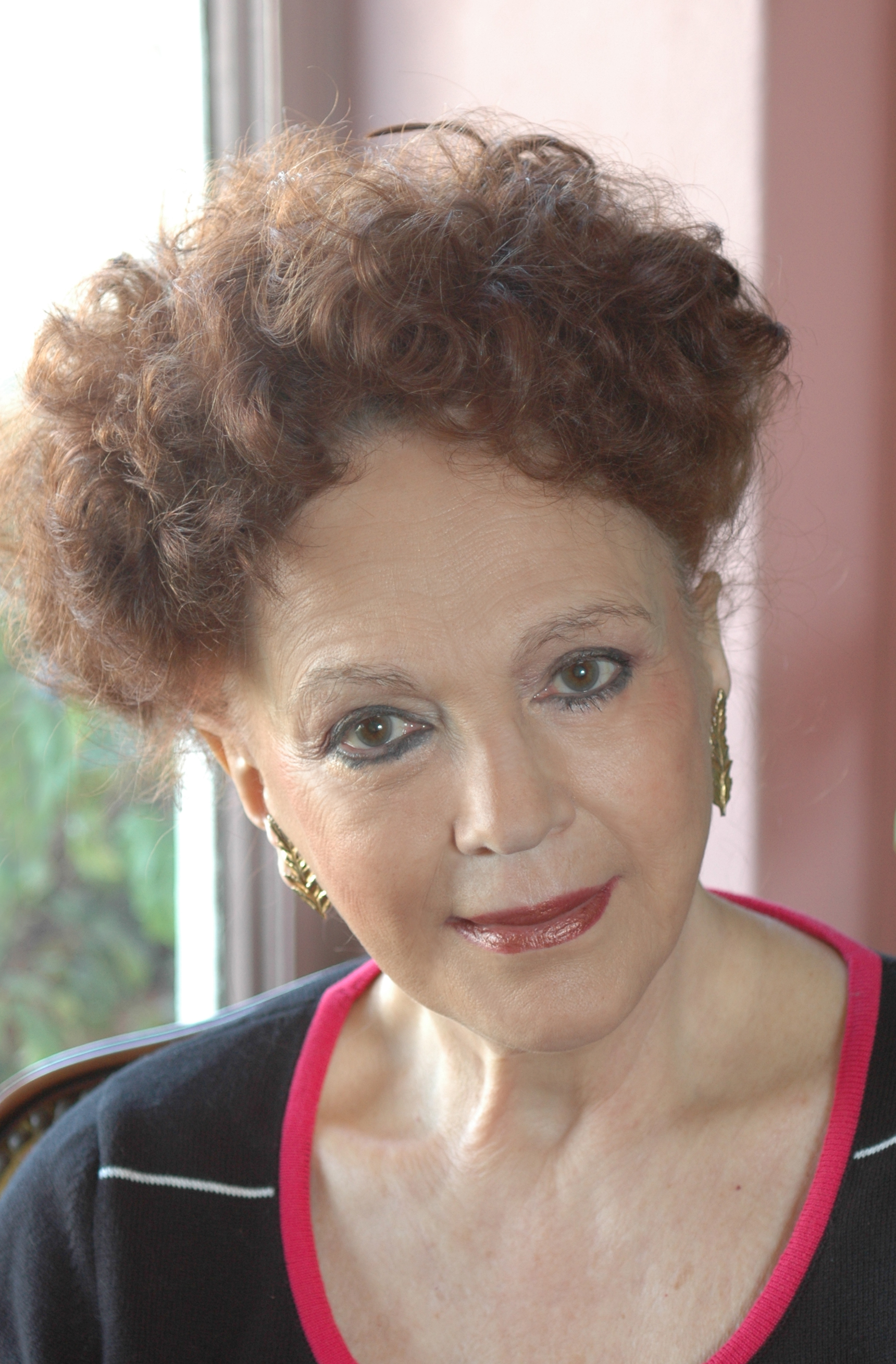

== Life and career ==
Giberti was born in Buenos Aires on May 21, 1929. She graduated from the University of Buenos Aires. She had worked systematically throughout her professional life to develop theory, praxis and dissemination on women and especially on Gender Studies.

She was the creator and founder of the first School for Parents in Argentina in 1957, a private institution that in 1962 was incorporated into the scope of the Faculty of Medicine and taught its courses at the Children's Hospital. She established other headquarters in different provinces. The book School for Parents(three volumes) was published in 30 editions until 1973 when, for political reasons, it was stopped.

Giberti was an adjunct professor of childhood and adolescence, chair of developmental psychology in the Faculty of Psychology of the UBA in 1961/62. In December 1964, she attended as a speaker in Jerusalem the conference "The Role of Women for Peace" convened by Golda Meir.

She was invited by the Ministry of Education of Bolivia to teach a course for tertiary technicians dedicated to children and adolescents in asylum or correctional facilities. She was invited by the University of Bolivia (Santa Cruz de la Sierra - Faculty of Psychology) to create a School for Parents in the region. This task was carried out from 1975 to 1980.

From 1993 to 1999, she was a consultant for UNICEF Argentina and vice-president of the Permanent Commission for the Lives of Children in Latin America and the Caribbean.

In 2016, she received the Konex Platinum Award in the discipline of Gender Studies in Argentina.

Giberti died on December 14, 2025, at the age of 96.
