= Horacio Rega Molina =

Argentine poet (1899–1957)

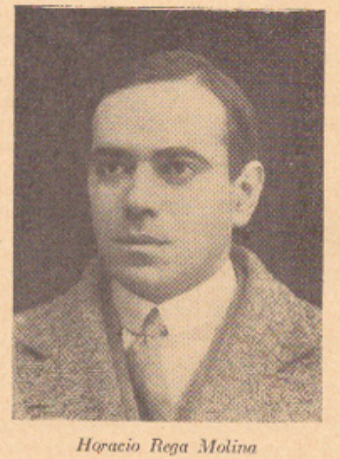

Horacio Rega Molina (1899 – 24 October 1957) was an Argentine poet specialized in sonnets, journalist, teacher, and dramatist. He worked as a literary critic in the newspaper El Mundo.

The works of his youth produced between 1919 and 1925, show an evident influence of the style of Leopoldo Lugones who sponsored him. His works abound in stories and poems about the Argentine countryside and the Argentine telluric spirit.

== Birth and death ==
Rega Molina was born in 1899 in San Nicolás de los Arroyos, Argentina. He died in Buenos Aires on 24 October 1957, alone because of the political passions of the time.

== Influences and work ==
Rega Molina was influenced by the writer Leopoldo Lugones and was a friend of Roberto Mariani and Cesar Tiempo.

His most important works include:

- "The Happy Hour" (1919)
- "The Poem of the Rain" (1922)
- "The Fragrant Tree" (1923)
- "On the Eve of Good Love" (1925)
- "Drawn from a Window Sunday" (1928)
- "Blue Map " (1931)
- "Provincial Oda" (1940)
- "Sentenced to Death Sonnets" (1940)
- "Root and Crown" (1943)
- "Homeland of the Field" (1946)
- "Sonnets My Blood"(1951)
- "Collection of Poems" (1954)

== Honors and posthumous works ==
Over the course of his life, Rega Molina won, among other distinctions, the Municipal Poetry Prize in 1925, the Grand National Prize for Poetry in 1951 and the top prize of the PEN Club. In his hometown, the day of his birth (10 July) was declared by municipal ordinance, "the day of nicoleña culture".

In 1994, Plus Ultra released two posthumous books, Odes of Jail and on Horseback and Consecration of the Fire.
