= Legends and myths regarding the Titanic =

"Unsinkable" ship and other made-up details

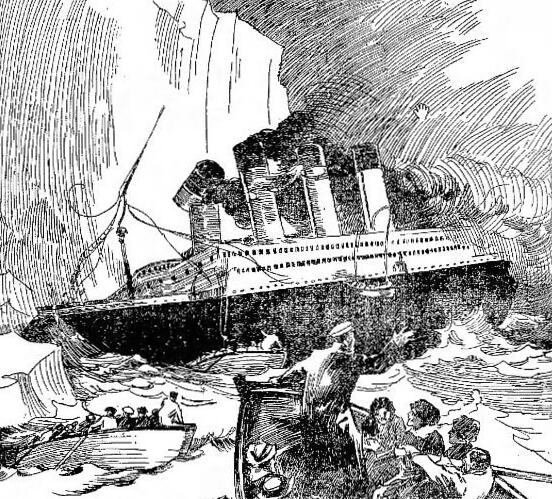
The sinking of the Titanic has inspired many urban legends.

There have been several legends and myths surrounding the RMS Titanic and her destruction after colliding with an iceberg in the Atlantic Ocean. These have ranged from stories involving the myth about the ship having been described as "unsinkable" to the myth concerning the final song played by the ship's musicians.

== Description as "unsinkable" ==
Contrary to popular mythology, the Titanic was never described as "unsinkable" without qualification until after she sank. Three trade publications described the Titanic as "practically" unsinkable prior to her sinking. Many survivors recalled in video interviews as well as in testimony that they had considered the ship "unsinkable". Shipbuilder Harland and Wolff did not claim she was unsinkable, but a promotional item from the White Star Line stressed the safety of the Olympic and the Titanic, claiming that "as far as it is possible to do so, these two wonderful vessels are designed to be unsinkable". Claims by trade publications that vessels were unsinkable or being practically unsinkable were not unique to the Olympic-class ocean liners or other White Star ships. Similar claims were made about the Cunarders RMS Lusitania and the RMS Mauretania, and German liners the SS Kaiser Wilhelm der Grosse and the Kaiser Wilhelm II. Advanced safety features on these liners were heavily publicised, de-emphasising the likelihood of these ships' sinking in a serious accident.

General arrangement of the 16 main compartments of the Titanic. The double bottom was 7 feet high and divided into 44 watertight compartments. There were additional 13 small compartments above the tank top, e.g., for the shaft tunnels.

The Titanic was designed to comply with the Grade 1 subdivision proposed by the 1891 Bulkhead Committee, meaning that she could stay afloat with any two adjoining out of its 16 main compartments open to the sea. The height of the bulkhead deck above the water line in flooded condition was well above the requirements, and the vessel would have been able to float with 3 adjoining compartments flooded in 11 of 14 possible combinations. The subdivisions could be sealed from communication with each other with cast iron watertight doors. To somewhat lower the chance of a sailor being caught in them, a geared system dropped the doors gradually, over 25 to 30 seconds, by sliding them vertically on hydraulic cataract cylinders.

The first unqualified assertion of the Titanic's unsinkability appeared in The New York Times on 16 April 1912, a day after the tragedy. Philip A. S. Franklin, vice president of the International Mercantile Marine Company (White Star Line's holding company) stated after being told of the sinking, "I thought her unsinkable, and I based my opinion on the best expert advice available. I do not understand it." This comment was seized upon by the press, and the idea that the White Star Line had previously declared the Titanic unsinkable (without qualification) gained immediate and widespread currency.

== David Sarnoff, wireless reports and the use of SOS ==
An often-quoted story that has been blurred between fact and fiction states that the first person to receive news of the sinking was David Sarnoff, who would later lead media giant RCA. In modified versions of this legend, Sarnoff was not the first to hear the news (though Sarnoff willingly promoted this notion), but he and others did staff the Marconi wireless station (telegraph) atop the Wanamaker Department Store in New York City, and for three days, relayed news of the disaster and names of survivors to people waiting outside. However, even this version lacks support in contemporary accounts. No newspapers of the time, for example, mention Sarnoff. Given the absence of primary evidence, the story of Sarnoff should be properly regarded as a legend.

Despite popular belief, the sinking of the Titanic was not the first time the internationally recognised Morse code distress signal "SOS" was used. The SOS signal was first proposed at the International Conference on Wireless Communication at Sea in Berlin in 1906. It was ratified by the international community in 1908 and had been in widespread use since then. However, the SOS signal was rarely used by British wireless operators, who preferred the older CQD code. First Wireless Operator Jack Phillips began transmitting CQD until Second Wireless Operator Harold Bride half jokingly suggested, "Send SOS; it's the new call, and this may be your last chance to send it." Phillips then began to intersperse SOS with the traditional CQD call.

There are reports that, in 1936, a ham radio operator named Gordon Cosgrave claimed to be receiving long delayed echo SOS messages from the Carpathia and the Titanic 24 years after their transmission.

== The Titanic's band ==
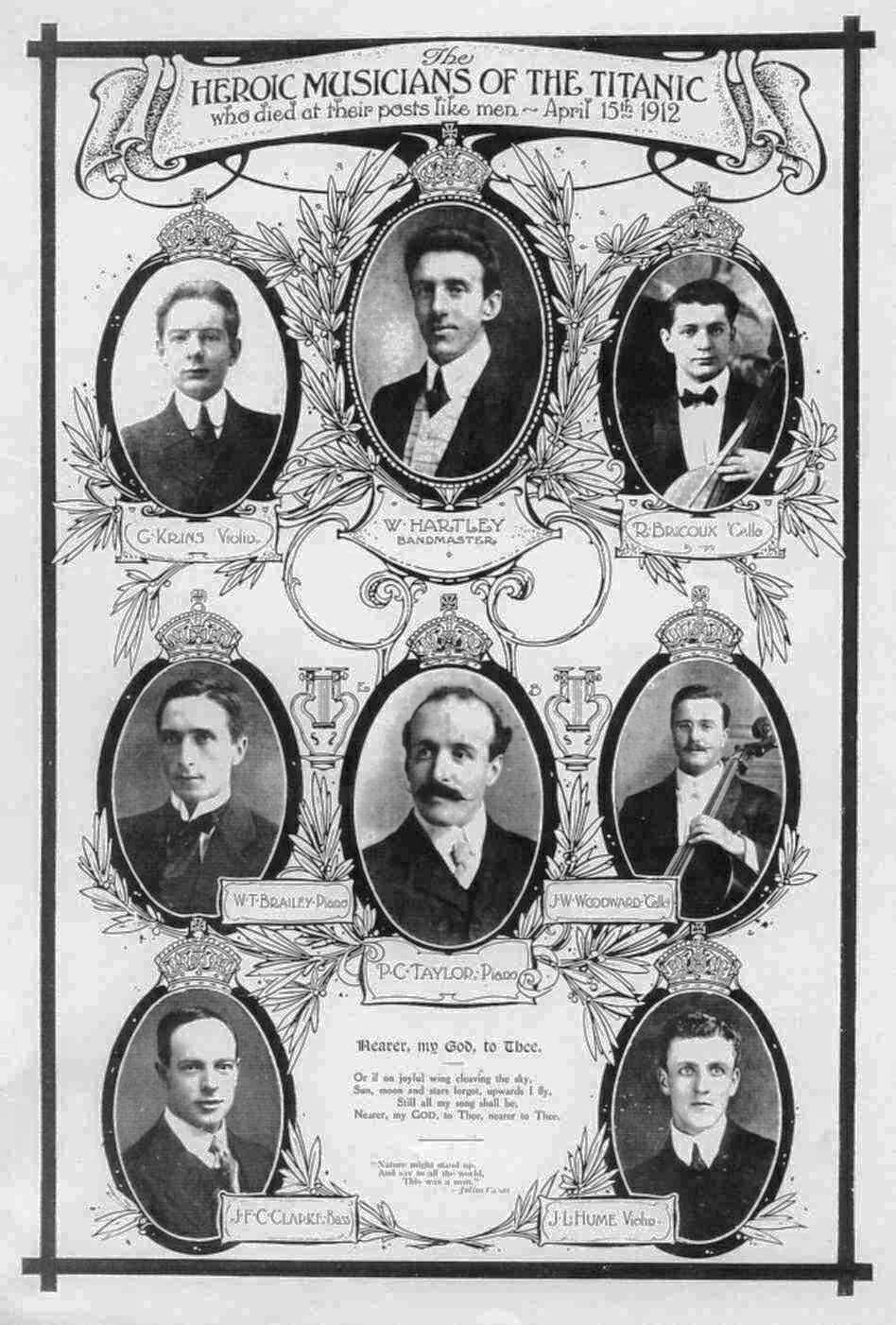
The eight members of the Titanic's band

One of the most famous stories regarding the Titanic is that of the ship's band. On 15 April, the eight-member band, led by Wallace Hartley, had assembled in the first-class lounge in an effort to keep passengers calm and upbeat. Later they moved on to the forward half of the boat deck. The band continued playing, even when it became apparent the ship was going to sink, and all members perished.

There has been much speculation about what their last piece was. A first-class Canadian passenger, Vera Dick, and several other passengers, claimed that the final tune played was that of the hymn "Nearer, My God, to Thee". Hartley reportedly once said to a friend if he were on a sinking ship, "Nearer, My God, to Thee" would be one of the songs he would play. But Walter Lord's book A Night to Remember popularised wireless operator Harold Bride's 1912 account (The New York Times) that he heard the song "Autumn" before the ship sank. It is considered Bride either meant the hymn tune by François Barthélemon known as Autumn or the tune of the then-popular waltz "Songe d'Automne (Dream of Autumn)" by Archibald Joyce. Autumn was not included in the White Star Line's repertoire book, but "Songe d'Automne" was. Bride is one of only two witnesses who were close enough to the band, as he floated off the deck before the ship went down. Some consider his statement to be reliable. Dick had left by lifeboat an hour and 20 minutes earlier and could not possibly have heard the band's final moments. The notion that the band played "Nearer, My God, to Thee" as a swan song is possibly a myth originating from the wrecking of the SS Valencia, which had received wide press coverage in Canada in 1906 and so may have influenced Dick's recollection.

There are three very different versions of the hymn using the lyrics of "Nearer, My God, to Thee": Horbury, written in 1861 by the Rev John Dykes was popular in Britain, and another, Bethany, written in 1856 by Dr Lowell Mason was popular in the United States. The third tune associated with the hymn, Propior Deo, was written by Sir Arthur Sullivan and was also popular in Britain. Additionally, the British melody might sound like the other hymn ("Autumn"). On 24 May 1912, the seven chief London orchestras performed at a memorial for the musicians who perished, as they played Horbury, two Titanic survivors in the audience became emotional and stated that this was the tune they heard while they were in their lifeboat. The film A Night to Remember (1958) uses the tune Horbury, while the film Titanic (1953), with Clifton Webb, uses the tune Bethany, as does James Cameron's Titanic (1997). To further complicate things, Horbury was the Anglican version of the hymn, while Propior Deo was the Methodist version. The Titanic's bandmaster, Wallace Hartley was a devout Methodist and son of a Methodist choirmaster leading a band containing several devout Methodists. Propior Deo was not only sung at Hartley's funeral but was also carved into his headstone. Recently, another possibility has been raised. Among items left behind by Hartley's fiancée, Maria Robinson, was the sheet music of a third tune to the hymn written by Lewis Carey in 1902 and made popular by the Australian contralto Ada Crossley. As Crossley performed in both Britain and America, it is possible that this may have been a tune known to passengers on both sides of the Atlantic.

Colonel Archibald Gracie IV, an amateur historian who was aboard the ship until the final moments, and was later rescued on a capsized collapsible lifeboat, wrote his account immediately after the sinking but died from his injuries eight months later. According to Gracie, the tunes played by the band were "cheerful" but that he didn't recognise any of them, claiming that if they had played "Nearer, My God, to Thee" as claimed in the newspaper, "I assuredly should have noticed it and regarded it as a tactless warning of immediate death to us all and one likely to create panic."

== Stories of W.T. Stead ==
Another oft-cited Titanic legend concerns perished first-class passenger William Thomas Stead. According to this folklore, Stead had, through precognitive insight, foreseen his own death on the Titanic. This is apparently suggested in two fictional sinking stories, which he had penned decades earlier. The first, "How the Mail Steamer Went Down in Mid Atlantic by a Survivor" (1886), tells of a mail steamer's collision with another ship, resulting in high loss of life due to lack of lifeboats. The second, "From the Old World to the New" (1892) features a White Star Line vessel, the Majestic, that rescues survivors of another ship that had collided with an iceberg.

== Mystery ship ==
Some believe that there was another ship, the Norwegian sealer Samson, in the vicinity of the Titanic when she sank. Proponents of the theory argue either that the Samson was a third ship in the area the night of the sinking, in addition to the Titanic and the Californian, or that the Californian was not near at all and it was the Samson which Titanic passengers spotted in the distance while the ship was sinking. Advocates of Captain Lord's innocence have avidly adopted the latter theory, beginning with Leslie Harrison, the general secretary of the Mercantile Marine Association in the 1960s.

The root of this claim comes from the testimony of one of the Samson's officers, Hendrik Bergethon Naess, who told a Norwegian newspaper in 1912 that his ship had been near a large liner with "many lights" shooting rockets into the sky the morning of 15 April. Because the Samson was seal hunting illegally in territorial waters, the ship's officers decided to move on quickly to avoid detection. This claim seems unlikely, as the Titanic was 504 miles (811 km) off the coast of Newfoundland, well beyond territorial waters in 1912. The ship had no radio, so she would not have received any of the Titanic's distress signals. Naess claimed that the crew only became aware of the Titanic's sinking after they arrived in Isafjordur, Iceland, in mid-May. If correct, the coordinates of the Samson place her within ten miles (16 km) of the Titanic's position as the ship was sinking.

Titanic historians have pointed to numerous inconsistencies in Naess' four published accounts. He cited the Samson as returning from seal-hunting south of Cape Hatteras (North Carolina), which is more than 1,000 miles (1,600 km) away from the cold waters of the Arctic Circle where seals live. The Titanic historian Leslie Reade obtained microfilmed Lloyd's List records reporting that the Samson docked in Isafjordur twice that April: on the 6th and the 20th, then on 15 May. The April dates would not have allowed anywhere near enough time for the Samson to be in the vicinity of the Titanic on 14 April. Furthermore, the idea that the crew of the Californian spotted the Samson instead of the Titanic is illogical since their descriptions are of a large steamer, not a small schooner like the Samson. Lastly, no other crew member from the Samson ever gave testimony supporting Naess' claim.

Defenders of the Samson theory argue that Naess said Cape Hatteras when he meant they were south of Cape Race, Newfoundland, seal-fishing waters which are physically very close to the site of the Titanic's sinking. They also argue that the Lloyd's Register dates of arrival in April are invalid because they were merely the expected arrival dates of the Samson, which did not actually dock until mid-May. Such theories have been dismissed by Titanic historians, including Leslie Reade, Walter Lord and Edward DeGroot.

== The Titanic curse ==
When the Titanic sank, claims were made that a curse existed on the ship. The press quickly linked "the Titanic curse" with the White Star Line practice of not christening their ships.

One of the most widely spread legends linked directly into the sectarianism of the city of Belfast, where the ship was built. It was suggested that the ship was given the number 390904 which, when reflected, resembles the letters "NOPOPE", a sectarian slogan attacking Roman Catholics, used by extreme Protestants in Ulster, where the ship was built. In the extreme sectarianism of the region at the time, the ship's sinking was alleged to be on account of anti-Catholicism by her manufacturers, the Harland and Wolff company, which had an almost exclusively Protestant workforce and an alleged record of hostility towards Catholics (Harland and Wolff did have a record of hiring few Catholics; whether that was through policy or because the company's shipyard in Belfast's bay was located in almost exclusively Protestant East Belfast—through which few Catholics would travel—or a mixture of both, is a matter of dispute). In fact, the RMS Olympic and the RMS Titanic were assigned the yard numbers 400 and 401, respectively.

Another myth is that the Titanic was transporting the supposedly cursed "Unlucky Mummy" Egyptian artifact from the British Museum to New York when she sank. However, the artifact in question is still housed in the British Museum today.

== Literary foreshadowing of the disaster ==
At the time the Titanic sank, the 1 May 1912 issue of The Popular Magazine, an American pulp magazine, was on the news stands. It contained the short story "The White Ghost of Disaster", which described the collision of an ocean liner with an iceberg in the Atlantic Ocean, the sinking of the vessel, and the fate of the passengers. The story, by Thornton Jenkins Hains under the pseudonym Mayn Clew Garnett, created a minor sensation.

In 1898, fourteen years before the Titanic disaster, Morgan Robertson wrote a book called The Wreck of the Titan: Or, Futility. This story features an enormous British passenger liner called the Titan, which, deemed to be unsinkable, carries insufficient lifeboats. On an April voyage, the Titan hits an iceberg and sinks in the North Atlantic with the loss of almost everyone on board.

"How the Mail Steamer Went Down in Mid Atlantic by a Survivor" is a short story that was published in the 22 March 1886, issue of the Pall Mall Gazette by the English investigative journalist and newspaper editor William Thomas Stead. Stead included this editorial comment: "This is exactly what might take place and will take place if liners are sent to sea short of boats".

In 1912, the German Berliner Tageblatt newspaper published a book in serial form that ran from 9 January until 24 April. This work of fiction was written by Gerhard Hauptmann, who would receive the Nobel Prize in Literature later that year. One month before the fateful April maiden voyage of the RMS Titanic, the story was published by S. Fischer Verlag as the novel Atlantis. Atlantis is a romantic tale set aboard fictitious ocean liner the Roland, which is coincidentally doomed to a fate similar to that of the RMS Titanic. This perceived anticipation of the Titanic disaster received considerable attention at the time. A Danish silent film also titled Atlantis was produced by Nordisk Film based on the novel. The film was released less than a year after the actual tragic event. The association became evident, and it was banned in Norway, perceived as being in "bad taste". In the book and in the film, the ship does not collide with an iceberg, but with another ship.

== Heroic dog ==
A large black Newfoundland dog named Rigel purportedly was responsible for saving many survivors according to stories published in at least one contemporary newspaper and retold many times thereafter, including in a book of contemporary accounts by Logan Marshall. Many details differ from known facts, and the stories might be untrue.

== See also ==
- Titanic conspiracy theories
- Titanic in popular culture
- List of films about the Titanic
