= The House of Asterion =

1947 short story by Jorge Luis Borges

- Short story by Jorge Luis Borges
- Original title: "La casa de Asterión"
- Country: Argentina
- Language: Spanish

Publication
- Published in: Los Anales de Buenos Aires
- Publication type: Periodical
- Media type: Print (magazine)
- Publication date: May 1947

"The House of Asterion" (original Spanish title: "La casa de Asterión") is a short story by Argentine writer Jorge Luis Borges. The story was first published in 1947 in the literary magazine Los Anales de Buenos Aires and republished in Borges's short story collection The Aleph in 1949. It is based on the Greek myth of Theseus and the Minotaur and is told from the perspective of Asterion, the Minotaur.

One of Borges's shortest stories, it was written over a period of two days and received generally positive reviews from contemporary critics and authors. The story explores themes of death, redemption, and the nature of monstrosity. Its narrative style has been referred to as a "literary puzzle", with the narrator's identity not fully revealed until the end of the story. Literary critic Gene H. Bell-Villada noted that "there is no instance of a major author so inverting the hero–monster relationship" prior to "The House of Asterion".

== Plot summary ==
The narrator, Asterion, introduces himself as a hermit unfairly shunned by society, but seems unaware of his monstrous appearance. He recalls how once, when he left his house, the commoners were so agitated that he now does not go out, believing that, as a child of a queen, his royal blood sets him apart. Asterion explains how he spends his days in solitude: running through the corridors; pretending to sleep; and sometimes pretending that "the other Asterion" has come to visit, and giving him a tour of the house.

Asterion describes his house in detail: that it has no locked doors; that it has many corridors and rooms, pools, and courtyards. He claims both it and the world beyond repeat infinitely, that only Asterion and the sun are singular in the universe. He considers if he had created the world and then forgotten it. He comes to see death as a religious redemption, joyfully delivering from evil the sacrificial nine men while happy to await his own prophesied "redeemer" in Theseus.

The story ends abruptly on a line of dialogue from Theseus to Ariadne, noting how the monstrous Minotaur hardly seemed to defend himself.

== Background and publication history ==
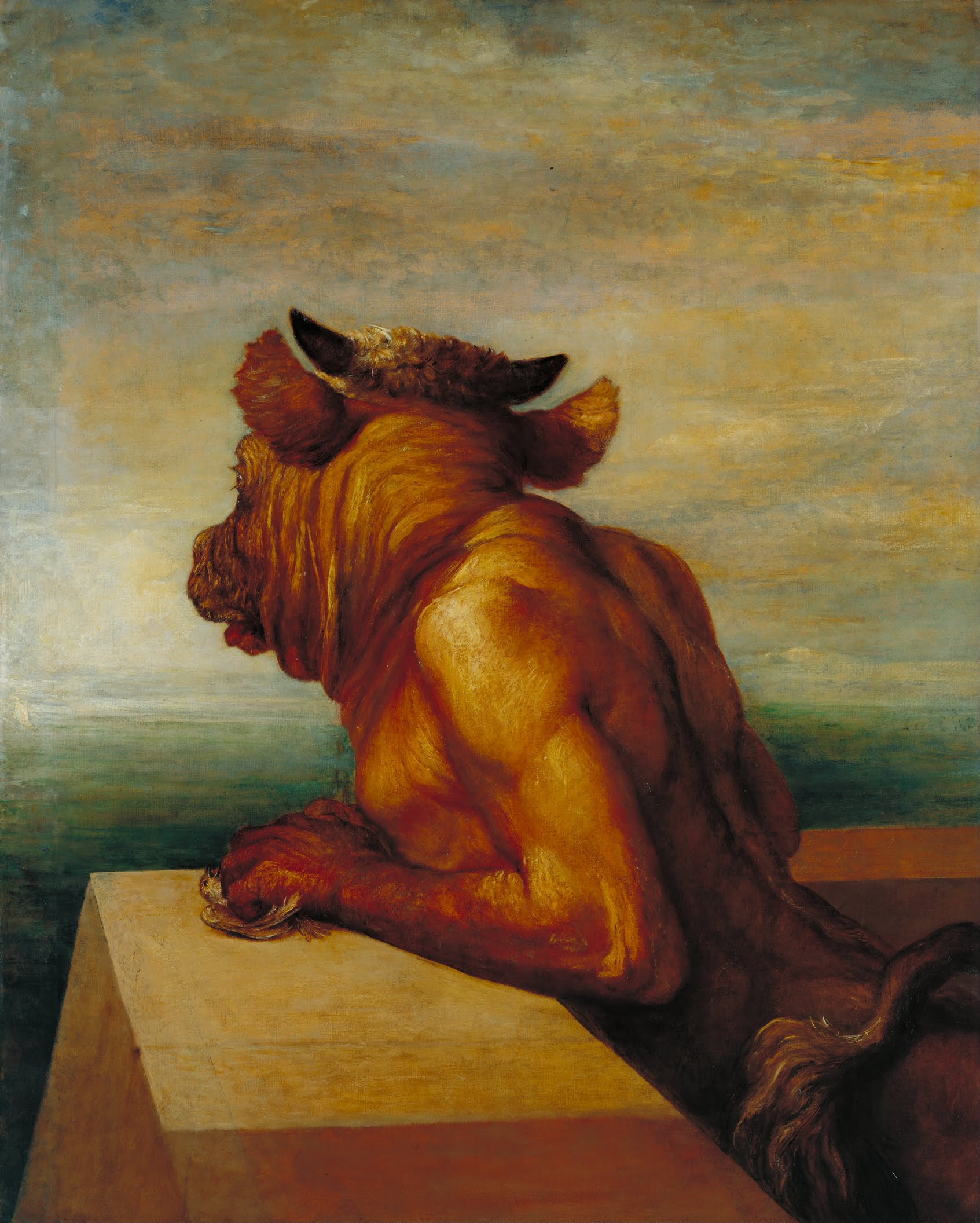
The Minotaur by George Frederic Watts, 1885

In the epilogue to his 1949 short-story collection The Aleph, Borges wrote that the inspiration for "The House of Asterion" and the "character of its sad protagonist" was The Minotaur, a painting completed in 1885 by English artist George Frederic Watts. The painting depicts the mythological Minotaur as a solitary and seemingly lonely creature, leaning on a parapet and staring longingly at the sea while gripping a crushed bird in his hand.

Borges's composition of "The House of Asterion" and other short stories in The Aleph coincided with his turbulent relationship with Argentine writer Estela Canto. Borges first met Canto in 1944 and proposed to her only a year later; but their relationship ended in July 1946 after Canto came to resent Borges's mother, whom she found to be overly controlling of him. Edwin Williamson, one of Borges's biographers, wrote that Canto's desertion of Borges and his subsequent unhappiness influenced elements of "The House of Asterion", including the title character's extreme loneliness and desire to be liberated from his monotonous existence.

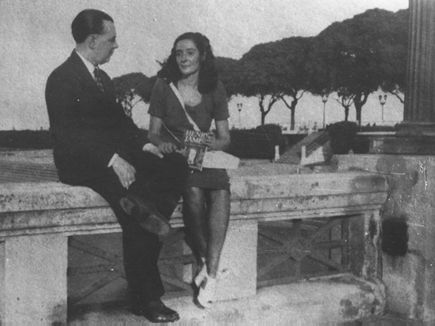
Borges with Estela Canto in 1945

According to Norman Thomas di Giovanni, an editor and translator who frequently collaborated with Borges, "The House of Asterion" was written over a period of two days in 1947, after Borges discovered that he had two blank pages to fill in Los Anales de Buenos Aires, the literary magazine he edited. Modern analyses of Borges's original handwritten manuscript, which is kept at the University of Virginia, have revealed the revisions he made to earlier drafts of the work in order to more effectively disguise the narrator's identity in the story's beginning. For instance, Borges replaced the phrase "los griegos" (the Greeks) with "los hombres" (the men) in the third sentence, removing a potential intimation of Greek mythology. Analyses of Borges's revisions have also suggested that, while writing the story, he experimented with various framings of the reveal of Asterion's identity, deliberating on whether to explicitly name the Minotaur's labyrinth and to mention the nature of Theseus's weapon.

The original Spanish-language version of "The House of Asterion" was published in print in the May–June 1947 edition of Los Anales de Buenos Aires. It was accompanied by an illustration, by Austrian artist Marie Elisabeth Wrede, depicting Asterion slumped on the ground with his head covered by a shroud, as Theseus stands over him, sword in hand. The story would later be included, alongside twelve other short stories by Borges, in The Aleph, first published by Editorial Losada in June 1949. It was translated into English by James Irby and Donald Yates in their 1962 collection Labyrinths, and by Di Giovanni (in collaboration with Borges) in 1970.

== Style ==
=== Narration ===
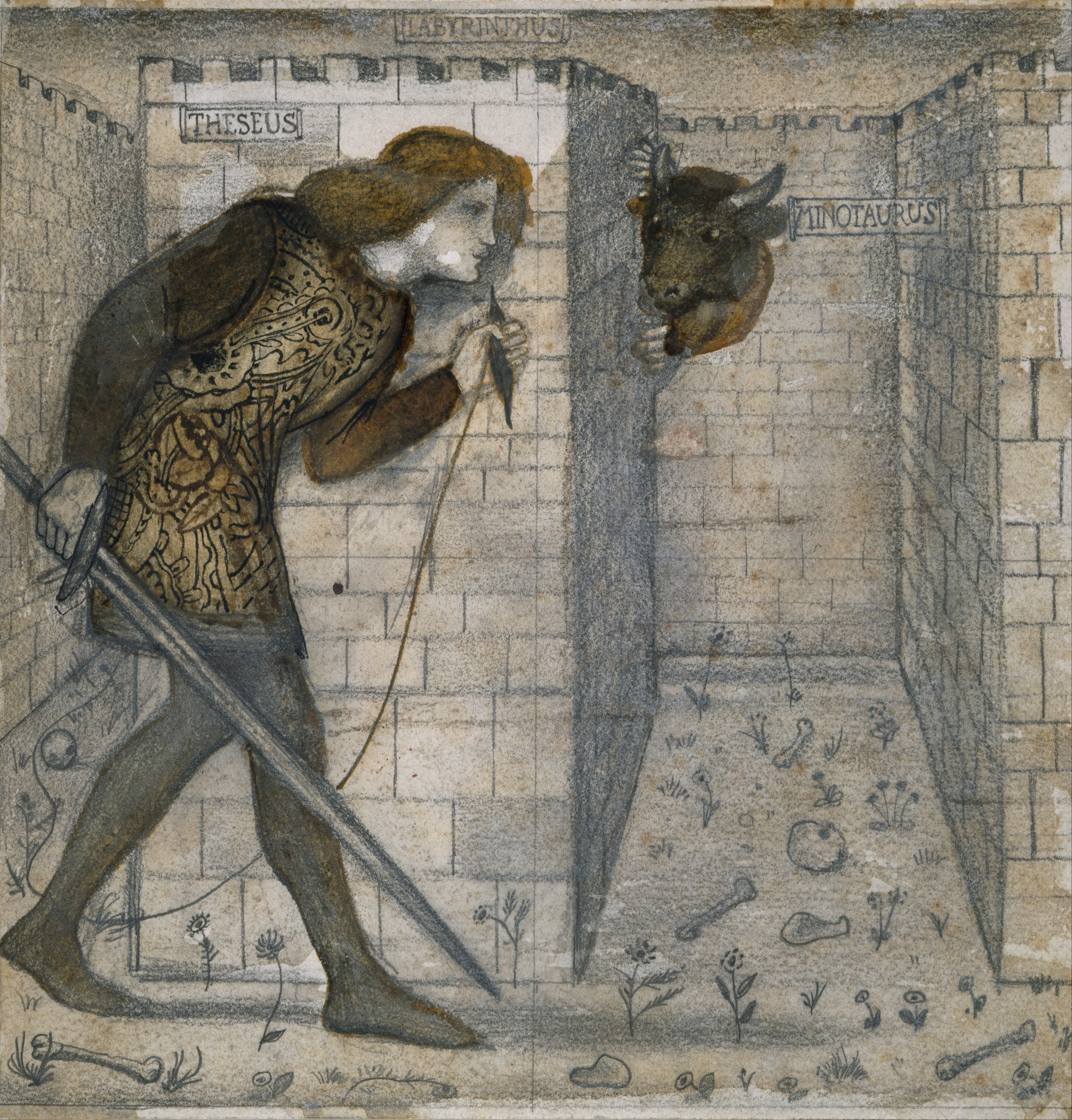
While the myth is traditionally told from Theseus' perspective, Borges focuses on the Minotaur.

"The House of Asterion" has been presented as an example of using an "unnatural narrator", for its use of an unconventional, nonhuman narrator. The bulk of the story consists of Asterion's inner monologue, which limits the reader's vision to Asterion's view of the world. This narrative technique was frequently employed by Borges, including in the short stories "Man on Pink Corner" and "The Form of the Sword". The presentation of the well-known myth from Asterion's perspective also serves to humanize him, casting him as more of an eccentric, sympathetic character than a monstrous one. Literary critic Gene H. Bell-Villada wrote that "prior to Borges's little fable, there is no instance of a major author so inverting the hero–monster relationship".

Several analyses have noted the apparent presence of an unnamed third-person editor who briefly clarifies Asterion's language throughout the story. In a footnote, the editor admits to replacing Asterion's use of the numeral "fourteen" with the word "infinite" after inferring this to be Asterion's original intent. The filtering of Asterion's words through this anonymous editor, who is also privy to Theseus's comments to Ariadne after he kills Asterion, contributes to the story's tension.

=== Structure ===
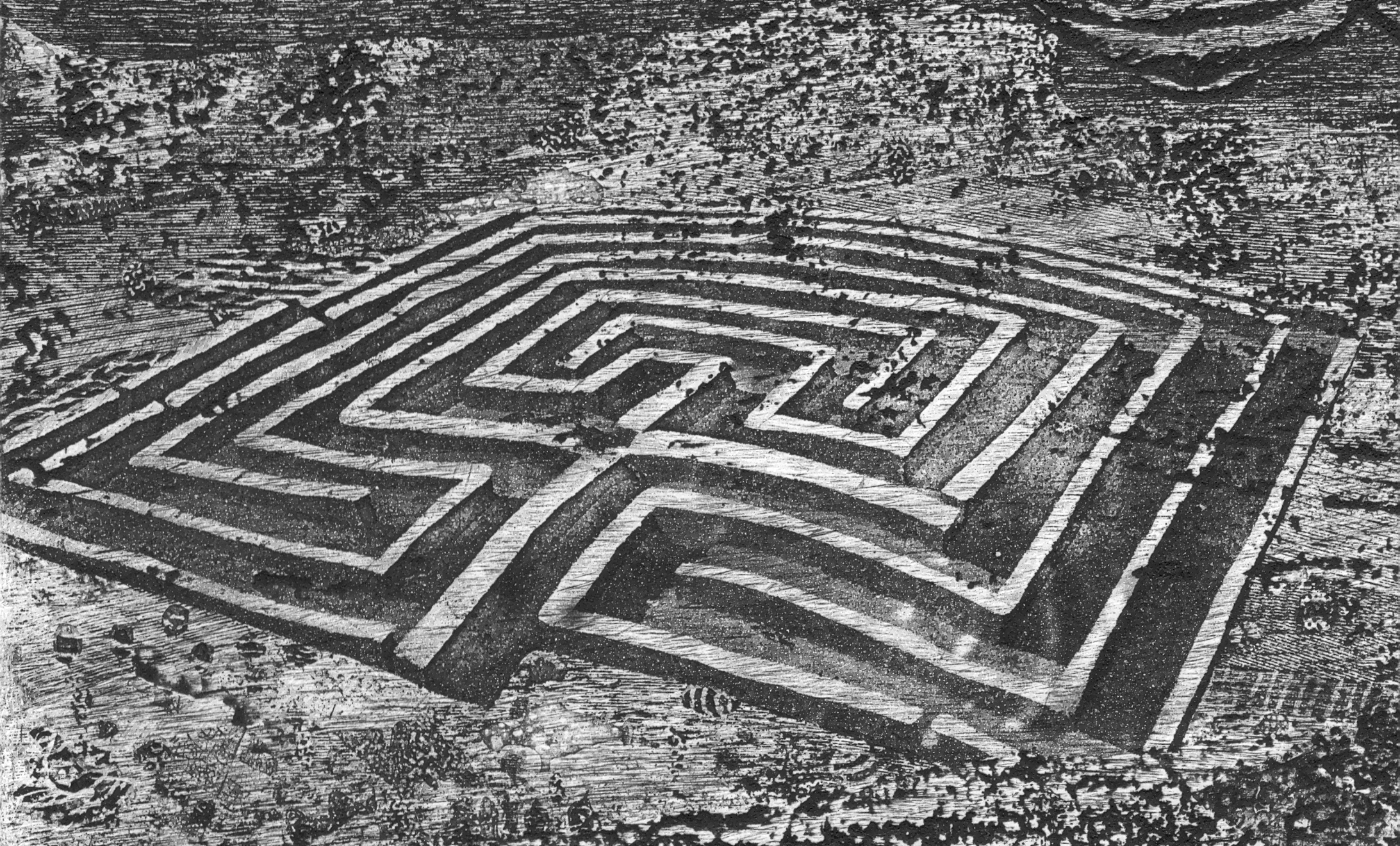
Labyrinths feature prominently in many of Borges's works, including "The House of Asterion".

One of Borges's shortest stories, "The House of Asterion" has been described as an "assemblage of clues" and a "literary puzzle" whose solution is gradually hinted at but not fully revealed until the end. Its structure is thus similar to a labyrinth—the story's setting and an object of Borges's lifelong fascination—that the reader must "penetrate to the identity of the prisoner and thus to the meaning of the story". The story's epigraph, directly quoted from Apollodorus's Bibliotheca, intimates the narrator's identity at the onset, but only for readers already acquainted with the Minotaur's lesser-known name. Further hints are provided in the descriptions of Asterion's labyrinth-like environment with no furnishings, the surrounding sea, and Asterion's declaration that he is the son of a queen (i.e., Pasiphaë). As the story progresses, the reader is "caught in the Cretan labyrinth along with the Minotaur and Theseus".

Literary critic Roberto González Echevarría noted that Borges employed the technique of defamiliarization, first described by the Russian formalists, in adding an unexpected twist to a well-known myth. By first setting the reader up to empathize with the narrator, and ultimately revealing the narrator to be a monstrous creature, Borges adds "a newly aesthetic, historicized twist" to the Minotaur's mythology. By the end of the story, "the reader feels sorry for the monster".

== Themes ==
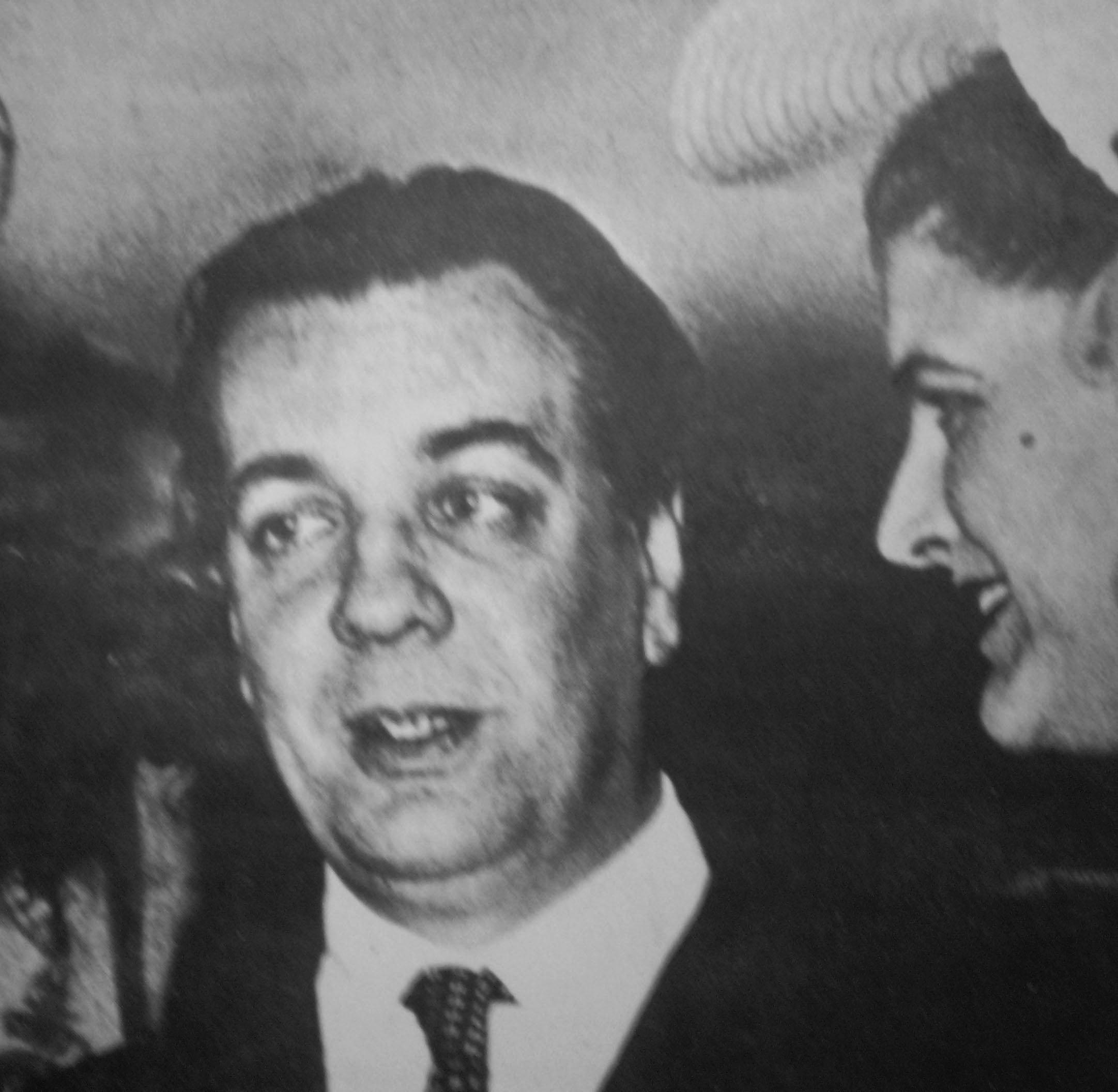
Borges in the 1940s

=== Monstrosity and humanity ===
Through the character of Asterion, Borges explores the qualities that define one as monstrous or human. Borges does not shy away from increasingly explicit references to Asterion's monstrous nature, including the terror he inspires in the townspeople and his ritual of slaughtering the young men. Yet Asterion is seemingly unaware of his monstrous nature, and the emotions that he describes—loneliness, pride, hope—are more human than monstrous, eliciting sympathy in readers rather than horror. The humanization of Asterion has the opposite effect on the reader's attitude toward Theseus; the mythological hero becomes the murderer of a pitiful creature who does not even resist him. Borges thus blurs the line between human and monster; Asterion is no more monstrous for killing the young men than Theseus is for killing Asterion.

=== Death and redemption ===
Borges commented on Asterion in a 1969 interview, saying that the character "knew all the time there was something awful about him, so he must have felt thankful to the hero who killed him". His longing for death, and freedom from his labyrinth, mirrors that of the immortal protagonist of another of Borges's short stories, "The Immortal", and is reflected in the painting by Watts that inspired "The House of Asterion".

Asterion's suggestion that he is delivering his victims from evil indicates that he believes the world to be evil, and that, in killing the men, he is actually saving them. His apparent belief that life is evil, and death is liberation from that evil, foreshadows his eventual defenseless surrender to Theseus's sword. Asterion's allusion to the Lord's Prayer leads to his final thoughts, which regard his own anticipated savior and take on a distinctly biblical tone. His insistence that "I know that my redeemer lives and he will finally rise above the dust" parallels Job's exclamation in the Book of Job: "For I know my Redeemer liveth, and that he shall stand at the latter day upon earth". Borges's deliberate quotation of Job indicates that Asterion considers his redeemer to be akin to a supreme God, who will take him to "a place with fewer galleries and fewer doors" (i.e., heaven).

== Reception ==
"The House of Asterion" received generally positive reviews from contemporary critics and authors. Argentine literary critic Emilio Carilla praised Borges's originality, describing the story as "la unidad de técnica, expresion y tema" ("the unity of technique, expression, and theme"). Novelist Julio Cortázar complimented Asterion's characterization in a letter to Borges, writing: "[L]o encuentro pleno de admirable inteligencia" ("I find him full of admirable intelligence"). In a review for the literary magazine Sur, Argentine writer Estela Canto, who had recently ended her relationship with Borges, praised the story for its "infinita riqueza" (infinite richness) and use of symbolism. In an extensive 1960 analysis of the story, author and critic Enrique Anderson-Imbert wrote positively of Borges's complex metaphysical comparisons between Asterion's labyrinth and the universe, despite the story's brevity, but noted that he did not consider it to be among Borges's best works.

== Influence and media ==
- The 1996 film Death and the Compass, based on Borges's short story of the same name, contains allusions to a number of other stories by Borges, including "The House of Asterion".
- The 2000 novel House of Leaves, by American writer Mark Z. Danielewski, contains numerous references to Borges and "The House of Asterion", including a chapter, titled "The Minotaur", that opens with a quote from Borges and presents a sympathetic interpretation of the Minotaur.
- The 2009 painting La casa de Asterión (The House of Asterion), by Cuban American artist Luis Cruz Azaceta, depicts the head of Asterion embedded on a house with fourteen rooms, as described in the story.
- The 2009 painting Asterión, by Cuban-American artist Paul Sierra, depicts the dead Asterion beneath a starry night, a reference to Asterion's suggestion that he is the creator of the stars.
- The 2020 novel Piranesi by Susanna Clarke describes a labyrinth, "the House", in a similar manner to "The House of Asterion". Clarke has said that "Another Borges story that I particularly loved was The House of Asterion. Until very recently I don’t believe I’d read it for 20 or 30 years. But when I did read it I was astonished by the way that story and Piranesi echo back and forth. Details I’d entirely forgotten are there in Piranesi. Even sentence structures."

== See also ==
- The Outsider (short story)
- Grendel (novel)
