= The Minotaur (painting) =

Painting by George Frederic Watts

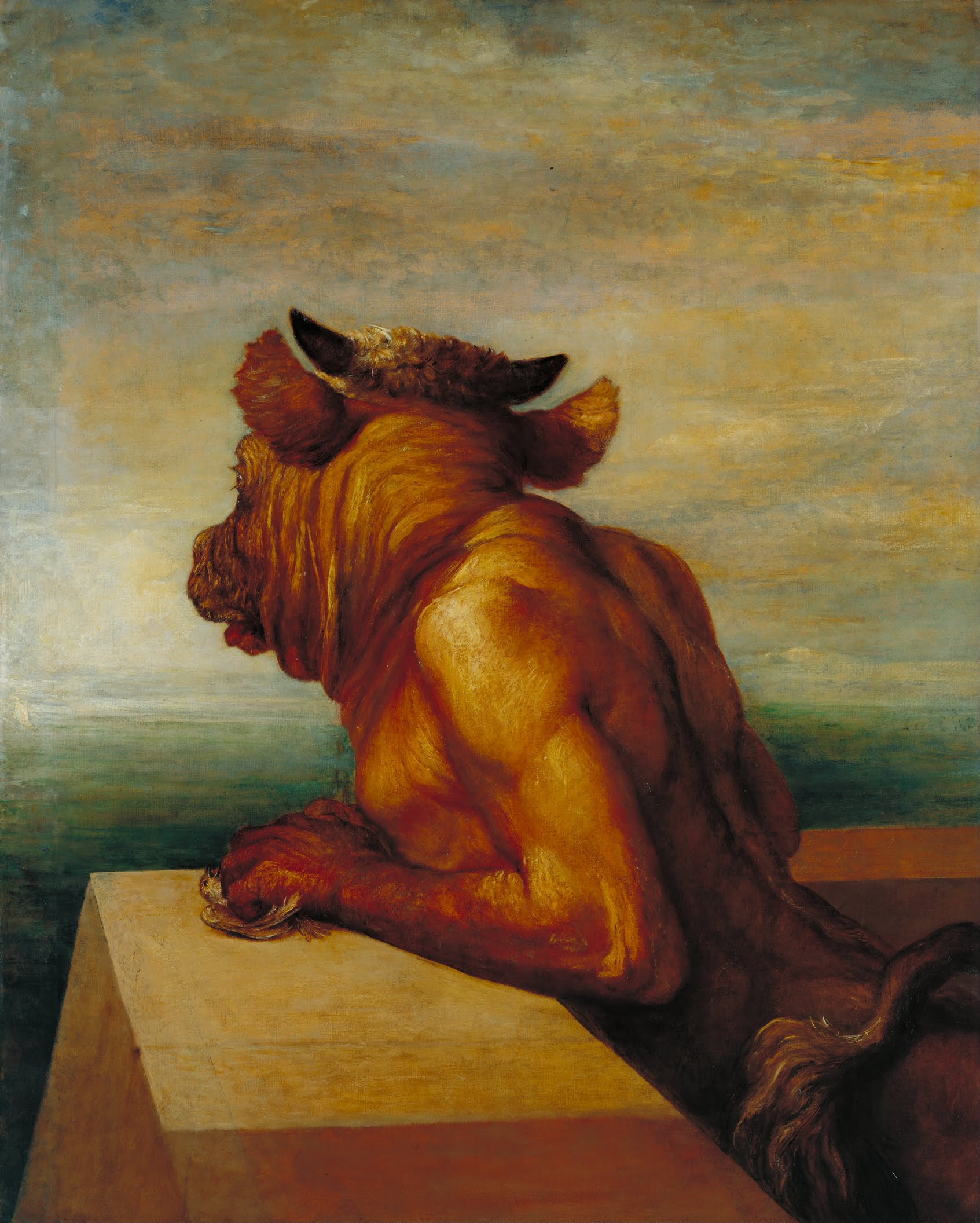
- Artist: George Frederic Watts
- Year: 1885
- Medium: oil on canvas
- Dimensions: 118.1 cm × 94.5 cm (46.5 in × 37.2 in)
- Location: Tate Britain, London

The Minotaur is an 1885 painting by the English painter George Frederic Watts. It depicts the Minotaur from Greek mythology as he waits for his young sacrificial victims to arrive by ship. It is an allegorical comment to child prostitution, an issue brought to attention by W. T. Stead in 1885. The painting has been in the collection of Tate Britain since 1897.

== Background ==
The Minotaur was most likely inspired by an article series by W. T. Stead titled "The Maiden Tribute of Modern Babylon", published in the Pall Mall Gazette in July 1885. Stead was the leading advocate against child prostitution in London and used the myth of the Minotaur and human sacrifices as an allegory in his article series. His journalism was groundbreaking and controversial with its investigative methods that included the purchase of a 13-year-old girl from her parents. The articles contributed to the passing of the Criminal Law Amendment Act 1885, which changed the age of consent from 13 to 16 and criminalised homosexuality. According to George Frederic Watts' friend Mrs Russell Barrington, Watts painted The Minotaur in response to "a painful subject" brought to attention by an article in an evening newspaper, believed by art historians to be one of Stead's articles. Watts made the painting quickly in one morning.

== Subject and composition ==
The Minotaur, a monster from Greek mythology who is half man and half bull, is seen half from behind, looking out over the sea behind a parapet in yellow sunlight. The monster is depicted as a red, muscular figure with a bull's head, hoof-like fists and a tail. According to the myth, the Minotaur lived on the island of Crete and the mainland Athenians were compelled to regularly ship seven of their young men and seven virgin girls for him to eat. (Note: The interval varies between every year and every nine years depending on the source. The myth of the Minotaur is told in Pseudo-Apollodorus' Bibliotheca, Diodorus Siculus' Bibliotheca historica, Plutarch's Theseus, Pausanias' Description of Greece, Virgil's Aeneid and Ovid's Heroides and Metamorphoses.) The painting shows the Minotaur as he waits for the ship to arrive. One of his fists leans on the parapet and holds a small, crushed bird, which symbolises youthful innocence and purity. Watts said at the first exhibition of The Minotaur that he wanted to "hold up to detestation the bestial and brutal". The painting is made with oil paint on canvas and measures 118.1 cm × 94.5 cm (46.5 in × 37.2 in).

== Provenance ==
The Minotaur was first shown at the 1885 Liverpool Autumn exhibition. In 1897, Watts gave The Minotaur and seventeen other paintings, including Mammon (1885), to the National Gallery of British Art, later renamed Tate Britain.

== Legacy ==
Jorge Luis Borges discovered The Minotaur through a book about Watts by G. K. Chesterton and it inspired him to write the short story "The House of Asterion" (1947). Borges' story is from the perspective of the Minotaur who describes his solitary life.
