= Titan disaster =

Titan disaster may refer to:

- 1980 Damascus Titan missile explosion, a nuclear weapons incident involving a Titan II Intercontinental Ballistic Missile
- Titan submersible implosion, implosion of a submersible craft during a voyage to explore the wreck of RMS Titanic in 2023

Fictional events

- The Wreck of the Titan: Or, Futility, 1898 novella by Morgan Robertson that describes the sinking of a British ocean liner named Titan
- Attack on Titan (film), 2015 post-apocalyptic Japanese film based on the manga of the same name created by Hajime Isayama.
