= Government by Journalism =

Political ideology involving journalism

Government by Journalism was a form of New Journalism pioneered by the English newspaper editor William Thomas Stead in which he began to think of journalism as more than just a position to report information, but through the paper the journalist or editor could become ruler.

== Lord Cromer and Government by Journalism ==
In 1883, Stead launched a crusade which resulted in General Gordon being sent to Sudan, where he was killed. According to Stead's biographer Grace Eckley, this was an exhibit of Stead's "journalistic prowess". Stead published an article titled "Lord Cromer and Government by Journalism" detailing his viewpoint of the affair.

== The Maiden Tribute of Modern Babylon ==
The Maiden Tribute of Modern Babylon is an example of 'Government by Journalism', since it led to the passage of the Criminal Law Amendment Act 1885, also known as the 'Stead Act' or 'Stead's Act'.

W. T. Stead wrote of the connection between the 'Tribute' series and his 'Government by Journalism' in his publication The Review of Reviews: "The Pall Mall Gazette, however, held its hand. Its object being to pass a new law, and not to pillory individuals, there was no need to mention names."

=== Criticism ===
In 1887, Matthew Arnold was credited with coining the phrase "New Journalism", a term that went on to define an entire genre of newspaper history, particularly Lord Northcliffe's turn-of-the-century press empire. However, at the time, the target of Arnold's irritation was not Northcliffe, but the sensational journalism of Pall Mall Gazette editor, W. T. Stead. He strongly disapproved of the muck-raking Stead, and declared that, under Stead, "the P.M.G., whatever may be its merits, is fast ceasing to be literature."

== See also ==
- Fourth Estate – Term for press and news media
- Muckraking
