= Titan wreck =

Titan wreck may refer to:

- The Wreck of the Titan: Or, Futility, a 1898 novella
- The Wreck of the Titan, a 2010 Doctor Who audio drama episode
- the wreckage from the 2023 Titan submersible implosion
