= Charles Barker Howdill =

English architect and photographer

Charles Barker Howdill (1863–1941) was a Leeds architect and photographer, who travelled extensively on the European continent before the First World War and gave hundreds of illustrated magic lantern lectures about his journeys. Howdill was among the first to exhibit colour photographs at the Royal Photographic Society, beginning in 1901.

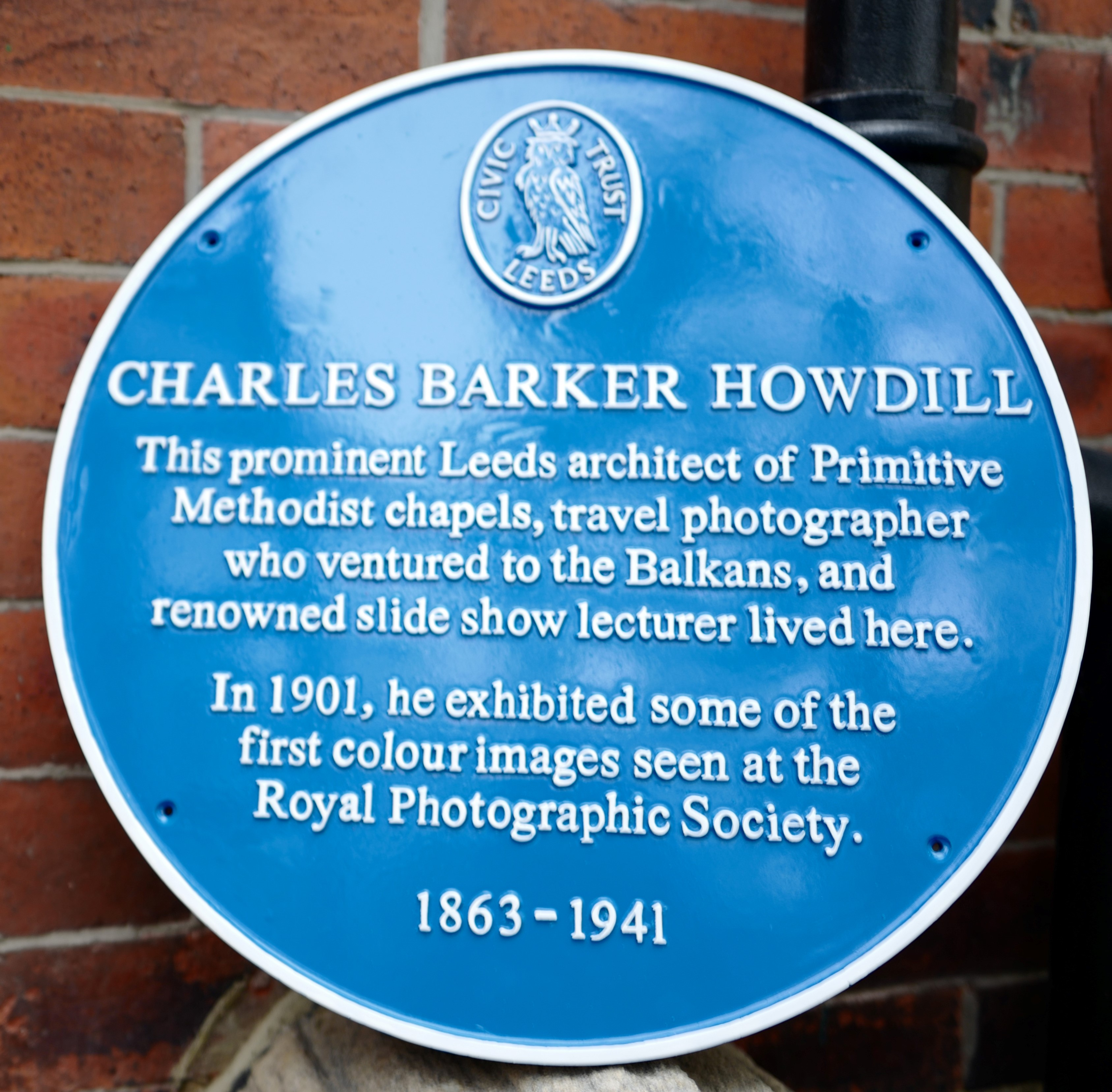
Leeds Civic Trust blue plaque for Charles Barker Howdill

== Architect ==
Howdill studied at the Leeds College of Art, winning a series of national prizes for his drawings and designs during his twenties. These included a coveted National Gold Medal for his design of a post office - the first Leeds student to win this distinction. After serving for a time as Assistant Architect to the Leeds Schools Board, he was made an Associate of the Royal Institute of British Architects in 1892. Howdill later joined his father Thomas Howdill's architecture practice and together the father-and-son team designed dozens of Primitive Methodist chapels all over the country, as well as numerous secular buildings, including mills and even a cinema. Notable projects included the striking Branch Road Primitive Methodist Chapel in Armley, now a Grade II listed building which has been re-purposed as a carpet showroom, as well as the Beckworth Tannery in Kirkstall. But after 1910 there were no new chapel commissions: Primitive Methodism began a slow decline, and the Howdills diversified their activities. The Howdill and Howdill architectural practice is the subject of an authoritative book chapter by Leeds historian Colin Dews.

== Photographer ==
Charles B. Howdill became fascinated by the technical aspects of photography, and was an early adopter of the Autochrome colour process developed by the Lumiere Brothers. He gave his first known illustrated lecture, entitled Carillons, Canals and Coifs, in Leeds in 1897 and went on to give hundreds more. Among his most popular talks were the melodramatically entitled The Blazing Balkans and Corsica - Isle of Unrest. Ever the showman, Howdill would sometimes wow the room by taking a colour portrait of an audience member and developing it on the spot.

Elected President of the Leeds Camera Club in 1901, Howdill used his presidential address to challenge the prevailing fashion for artistic and aesthetically pleasing photographs, calling instead for a more documentary style of photography aimed at capturing 'old ceremonies, rites and customs' that would otherwise be lost. Between 1897 and 1912 he made at least six trips to the Continent, documenting people's daily lives and rituals.

On his travels, Howdill usually avoided capital cities and spent most of his time in provincial areas. When he visited Denmark in 1911, for example, he skipped Copenhagen, instead concentrating on the less-populated region of Jutland. A proud and highly opinionated Yorkshireman, Howdill claimed that there was a deep affinity between the peoples of Jutland and Yorkshire: 'A Yorkshireman is thus entitled to expect, in this country of his forefathers to come across some of the traits and characteristic energy found in his own broad shire'. He believed this affinity dated back to their shared ancestry following the invasion of modern-day Yorkshire by the Jutes in the fifth century AD.

Howdill's image of the journalist and controversialist, W. T. Stead, is the only known colour photograph taken in 1912 shortly before he perished on the RMS Titanic. Howdill's travel photographs are distant vignettes of the scenes he encountered.

== Later life and legacy ==
After the Great War Howdill travelled less, and earned his living mainly by teaching building-related subjects at Huddersfield Technical College and other vocational institutions in the West Riding. He served as organist of the Rehoboth Primitive Methodist Chapel for over 50 years until his death in 1941.

In 1993, Howdill's daughter Madge donated more than 800 of his glass slides and a quantity of notebooks and papers to Leeds Museums and Galleries. Twenty-five years later this archive was rediscovered by local historian Janet Douglas (historian) and University of Leeds professor Duncan McCargo, who created a small exhibition and website to commemorate Howdill's legacy. In October 2018, Leeds Civic Trust installed a blue plaque on Howdill's former house in Hanover Square.

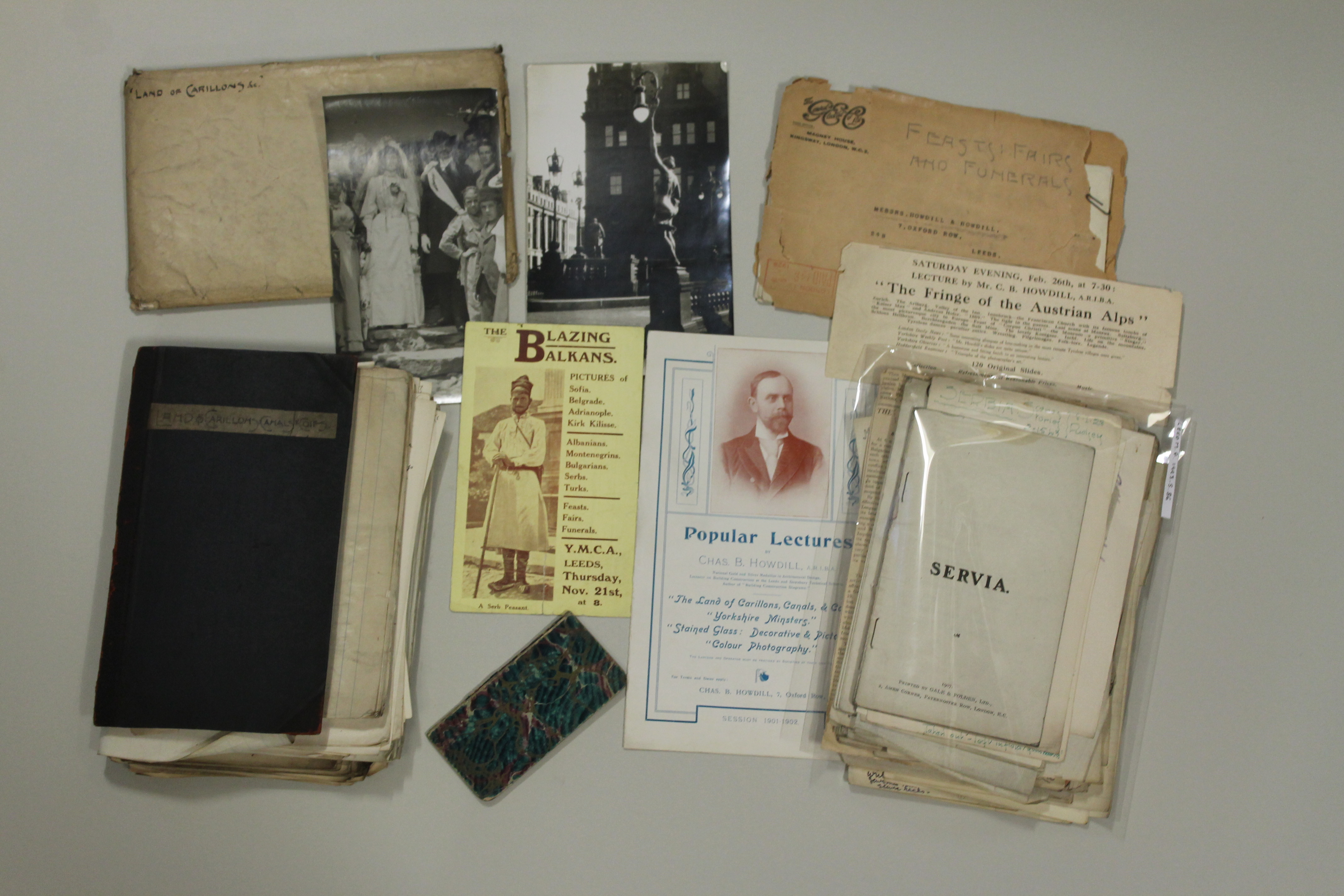
Howdill archives at Leeds Museums

== Madge's Armistice flag ==
An Armistice flag made by Madge Howdill and carried around Hanover Square on 11 November 1918 by the Howdills captured the public imagination during the centenary of the Armistice in 2018, when it was once more paraded around the Square and then presented to Leeds Museums. The large flag had been left in the attic of the former Howdill residence for a century. As part of an outreach project commissioned by Leeds Museums and led by Agnis Smallwood, 17 community groups in Leeds made their own full-sized versions of Madge's flag, depicting their hopes and ideas of peace. These were all displayed at Leeds City Museum in November 2018.
