= Julia A. Ames =

American journalist

Julie A. Ames
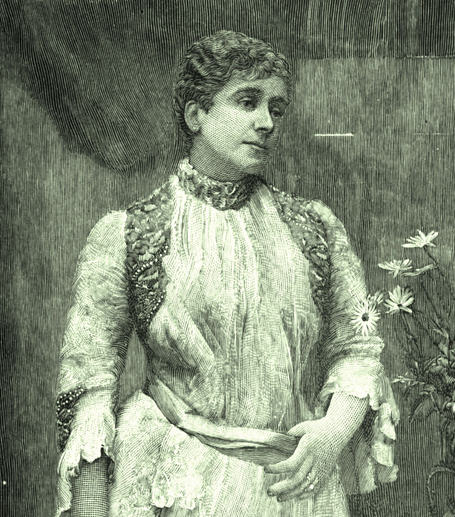
- Born: Julia A. Ames; October 14, 1861 near Odell, Illinois, U.S.
- Died: December 12, 1891 (aged 30); Boston, Massachusetts, U.S.
- Resting place: Riverview Cemetery, Streator, Illinois, U.S.
- Education: Streator Township High School, Illinois Wesleyan University, Chicago School of Oratory
- Occupations: journalist, editor, temperance reformer
- Writing career
- Language: English
- Literary movement: temperance movement

Signature
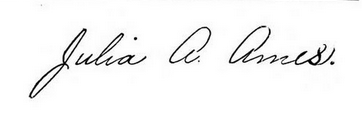

Julia A. Ames (October 14, 1861 - December 12, 1891) was an American journalist, editor and a temperance reformer. She served as an associate editor of the Woman's Temperance Publishing Association's Union Signal. Ames died in 1891 at the age of 30. The year after her death, the journalist and spiritualist W. T. Stead published automatic writing which was said to have been sent by Ames to her friend. Stead also created "Julie's Bureau" to allow others to communicate with the dead.

== Early years and education ==
Julia A. (nickname, "Yolande") Ames was born near Odell, Illinois, 14 October 1861. She was the daughter of Isaac Ames (1824-1894), a well-known, wealthy citizen of Streator, Illinois, and Aurelia Ann Mooar Ames (1823-1898). Her siblings were John C. Ames, Fannie Ophelia Ames, and Elmer Elsworth Ames.

Ames was reportedly a small and delicate child, but as she grew older, her health became vigorous. Ames began attending school at the age of three, as it was lonely for her to be left at home when the older children left. She attended every day that summer and learned to read. The schoolhouse was one of the first to be built in that part of the country. Her father helped to construct it and taught the first school lesson ever, becoming the headmaster later in his life. The name of the Ames schoolhouse stayed with it and made it a sort of monument to the first schoolmaster, who was, like his youngest daughter, a devoted lover of learning. Ames' brother Elmer, who was two years her junior, was her close companion and playmate. As they grew up, they lost none of their devotion to each other. Her elder and only sister accompanied Ames on Sunday mornings along with their grandfather to the little schoolhouse where religious services were held, in which they always participated.

When Ames was seven years old, her family moved to Streator, Illinois. She was 12 years old, when she was converted, having attended six weeks of revival meeting in the old church in Streator. The Methodist Church is not particularly rigid, so that her breezy spirit lost none of its elasticity from being developed in a religious atmosphere so highly charged.

She entered Streator Township High School in 1873, where she took a four-year course, and soon distinguished herself by her fondness for English literature and history. She was an excellent reader. Her quaint humor and remarkable good-nature made her a fine entertainer at the public exhibitions, where the literary society frequently gave presentations. Beginning in September 1879, she attended Wesleyan University, at Bloomington, Illinois, studying literature, history, art and aesthetics, as well as some of the languages and natural sciences. She was a member of the Munsellian literary society, and Kappa Gamma Greek sorority. At Wesleyan, she met Professor Susan M. D. Fry, an accomplished teacher, whom she always loved not only as an instructor, but as a most helpful and intimate friend. She left Wesleyan in June, 1881. She later graduated from the Chicago School of Oratory (now Columbia College Chicago).

== Career ==
For years, it was her thought that she would become a missionary, and when she decided to go into the temperance work one of her friends told her: "Julia, you have then relinquished the old idea of being a missionary?" whereupon she responded in her quick, bright way, "No, indeed, I am still thinking of it very strongly;" but she speedily found that temperance was really practical missionary work.

Helen Louise Hood first became acquainted with Ames in the summer of 1885 at the Lake Bluff (Illinois) Training School, but their real acquaintance did not begin until the Women's Christian Temperance Union's(WCTU) National Convention which was held a few months later at Philadelphia. On their way to the Convention, Ames was made a delegate by the Illinois white-ribboners. On the way back home, they talked long and earnestly about her future, Hood urging Ames to come and cast in her lot with the "white-ribboners". During this homeward ride, Matilda Carse was in the car reading a novel Yolande, by William Black. Seeing a resemblance in the character of the heroine of this book to Ames, Carse called her, requested to kneel and touched her head, then she kissed her lovingly on the forehead and said: "Arise! I dub thee, Yolande" - a name by which she was known afterwards by all of her associates.

On her return, Yolande became actively engaged in the work of the Chicago Central Union, one of the oldest and most influential unions in the city. She instituted the work which would be presented to the papers of that city and featured in weekly items of temperance news, which made her the Press Superintendent for The Union. Later, she became very much interested in the Bethesda Mission, which was conducted by the Chicago Union, and situated on Clark Street, one of the worst streets of the city. Here every Sunday, Ames could be found teaching in the Sunday school. This mission, as well as the one for the homeless and friendless women, which the WCTU cared for, had an active worker in Ames. The mission for women was named by her "The Anchorage," and for a long time, she kept a white lily on the windows of its reading room, so that the outcast women who passed its windows might see this pure flower, and, being attracted, might come in and learn of a better life.

In the spring of 1886, Ames' family moved from Chicago, her brother, Elmer, having finished law school, has gone west. As for Ames, she came to live at Rest Cottage. The first of the Chicago's daily published newspapers was a WCTU department's the Chicago Inter Ocean. In her first interviews with the editors, Ames' work was often disregarded and not published, cut. At first, only a few inches of space were provided for her texts. This space however, was gradually increased as editors learned that she was trustworthy. However, she began to occupy nearly a column, and editors ceased to cut her manuscript, again. But soon, more important work got her attention. When the national superintendent of press-work, Esther Housh, needed an assistant, Ames received the appointment.

Her connection with the central union brought her into intimate contact with other women, among whom, in addition to Hood and Carse, were Elizabeth Wheeler Andrew, and Frances Willard, these women and conversations with them moulded Ames' views. When Andrew felt that her health was deteriorating, she decided to give up her work on the Union Signal, the question of her successor was earnestly discussed. The thoughts of the leaders at once turned to Ames, and despite her youth, she justified the choice of those who urged her to succeed Andrew. Up to 1889, her specialities were the news from the field and children's department. She founded the department of illustrated biography and the queen's garden. Her forte was not so much writing, though she was ready with her pen, as it was the ability to choose or reject others' writing, and the winning power to draw from them their best thoughts. In 1889, she had sole charge of the Union Signal in the absence of the editor.

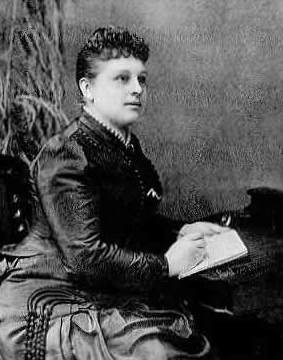
Julia Ames (1890)

She visited Europe in 1890, being gone for months, and satisfied some of her longings for the beautiful, in the scenes she visited, the paintings and statues she saw. While in England, she became acquainted with Lady Henry Somerset at Eastnor Castle, who afterwards became another strong factor in her life, giving her love and trust which lasted up until her death. In her letters, and on her return, Ames was full of praise for Lady Somerset — recognizing the fact that she was a great leader. Ames was received with honour by the British Woman's Temperance Association. While in London, she organized the press department of that society on lines similar to those of the American organization. She travelled through Europe with a party accompanied by Sarah E. Morgan, under the auspices of Mrs. M. B. Willard's school for girls. She witnessed the Passion Play at Oberammergau, visited Rome and other cities, and finally returned to the U.S. to resume her editorial duties at "Union Signal". She attended the Boston convention in November, 1891, in her editorial capacity. She assisted in editing of daily Union Signal, prepared the Associated Press dispatches each night, and was the chairman of one or two committees. Ames was a member of the Woman's Temperance Publishing Association, Circle of King's Daughters, and was president of that organization when she left Chicago for her European tour. The silver cross and the white ribbon were the symbols of her life.

== Death and Letters from Julia ==
Ames met William Thomas Stead in 1890. She was not well when she left Chicago, and she contracted a severe cold, which through the pressure of her work developed into typhoid pneumonia, of which she died December 12, 1891, in Boston, and was buried at Riverview Cemetery, in Streator. In 1897, Stead published a collection of communications he states were received from Ames to her friend, Miss E., entitled Letters from Julie. In 1909, he established "Julia's Bureau", an organization founded "to enable those who had lost their dead, who were sorrowing over friends and relatives, to get in touch with them again".

In the preface to After Death, Or, Letters from Julia: A Personal Narrative (1910), Stead went on to say,

Eight years ago I collected together and published the series of messages contained in this volume under the title, "Letters from Julia, or Light from the Borderland, received by automatic writing from one who has gone before." Since then the little volume has been six times reprinted in England, and at least one translation has appeared abroad. I have received so many grateful letters from persons in all parts of the world, who, after sorrowing for their dead as those that have no hope, felt on reading this book as if their lost ones were in very truth restored to life, that I can no longer refuse to issue it to a wider public. I have not changed a word or syllable in the letters themselves. They stand exactly as they were printed in the original edition where they were reproduced from the automatic manuscript of the invisible author who used my passive hand as her amanuensis. I have also left unaltered the introduction explaining how these letters were written. But I have changed the title to one which is more challenging than "Letters from Julia," and which also indicates more explicitly the subject of the book.

— W. T. Stead,
