= Borderland (magazine) =

Borderland was a magazine founded and edited by William Thomas Stead from 1893 to 1897. The focus of the publication was on spiritualism and psychical research, mainly from a supportive point of view.

In the 1890s, Stead became increasingly interested in spiritualism. In 1893 he founded Borderland as a popular spiritualist magazine giving full play to his interest in psychical research. The magazine appeared quarterly, priced 1/6. Stead declared that the new magazine would be for the general public, in distinction to the "select few" of the Society for Psychical Research As with the Review of Reviews, Stead was both proprietor and editor. He employed Ada Goodrich Freer as assistant editor: she was also a substantial contributor under the pseudonym "Miss X". Stead claimed that he was in the habit of communicating with Freer by telepathy and automatic writing. The magazine ceased publication in October 1897.
