= Estela Canto =

Argentine writer, journalist, and translator (19151994)

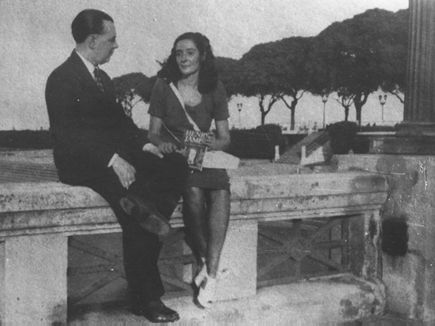
- Jorge Luis Borges with Estela Canto in 1945
- Born: September 4, 1915; Buenos Aires, Argentina
- Died: June 3, 1994 (aged 78); Buenos Aires, Argentina
- Occupations: Writer, translator, journalist, memoirist

Estela Canto (September 4, 1915 – June 3, 1994) was an Argentine writer, journalist, and translator best known for her relationship with Jorge Luis Borges.

== Life ==
Canto was the descendant of an old Uruguay family. Her ancestors included some important military men. Her brother Patricio Canto was also a writer, and authored the essay El caso Ortega y Gasset about the Spanish philosopher. Estela held various jobs during the late 1930s and early 1940s, including as a dancer-for-hire at a local dance hall, where men would pay women "by the dance" to serve as their partners.

In 1944, at the house of Adolfo Bioy Casares and Silvina Ocampo, Canto was introduced to Jorge Luis Borges. Borges was, at this time, already well regarded in literary circles. Initially he took little notice of Canto. Though she observed him with admiration and curiosity, she had no interest in forming romantic attachments to intellectuals. On their second meeting at Bioy's house, Borges asked her out. After an evening of dancing and chatting they discovered, among other things, a common admiration for George Bernard Shaw. Borges fell in love with Canto and wrote her a number of romantic letters, which Canto would later publish in her 1989 book about their relationship. In this book, Canto said of their relationship:

Borges' attitude moved me. I liked what I was to him, what he saw in me. Sexually I felt nothing for him, he didn't even make me uncomfortable. His kisses were clumsy, brusque, always poorly timed, and I accepted them condescendingly. I never pretended to feel what I didn't feel.

Borges' mother Leonor Acevedo Suárez disliked Canto on account of her sexual liberality and casual affairs with men. Nevertheless, Borges proposed to her. She replied:

I'd love to, Georgie, but don't forget that I'm a disciple of Bernard Shaw. We can't get married without first sleeping together.

Borges' infatuation with Canto faded with time. Many years later, they reestablished contact and became friends. Borges dedicated his collection The Aleph to Canto and gave her the original manuscript as a gift. According to her memoir of their relationship, she responded that the manuscript would be worth a lot more after his death; Borges responded, "If I was a gentlemen, in this moment I would go to the bathroom and you would hear a gunshot." It is widely assumed that Canto was the inspiration for the character of Beatriz Viterbo in the central story "The Aleph", the narrator's unrequited love. Canto sold this manuscript to Sotheby's for thirty thousand dollars, and it was later bought at auction by the National Library of Spain.

Canto contributed numerous translations to Sur, including selections from In Search of Lost Time.

== Work ==
The bulk of Canto's work describes life in Buenos Aires in the time before Peronism. In 1989 she published Borges a contraluz, a biography of the author in which she recounted various intimate details of their relationship. In 1999 this book was adapted into a film, directed by Javier Torre and titled Estela Canto, un amor de Borges.

- 1945 El muro de mármol ("The Marble Wall")
- 1950 El retrato y la imagen ("The Portrait and the Image")
- 1953 El hombre del crepúsculo ("The Man of the Evening")
- 1956 El estanque ("The Pond")
- 1962 La noche y el barro ("The Night and the Mud")
- 1966 Isabel entre las plantas ("Isabel among the Plants")
- 1973 Los otros, las máscaras ("Others, Masks")
- 1976 La hora detenida ("The Delayed Moment")
- 1978 El jazmín negro ("The Black Jasmine")
- 1980 Ronda nocturna ("Night Patrol")
- 1982 Detrás de la medialuna ("Behind the Half-Moon", written under the pseudonym of Evelyn Clift)
- 1989 Borges a contraluz ("Silhouette of Borges")

== Awards ==
- 1945 Premio Municipal for El muro de mármol
- 1945 Premio Imprena López por El muro de mármol

== See also ==
- Jorge Luis Borges
- Adolfo Bioy Casares
