= How the Mail Steamer Went Down in Mid Atlantic by a Survivor =

Short story

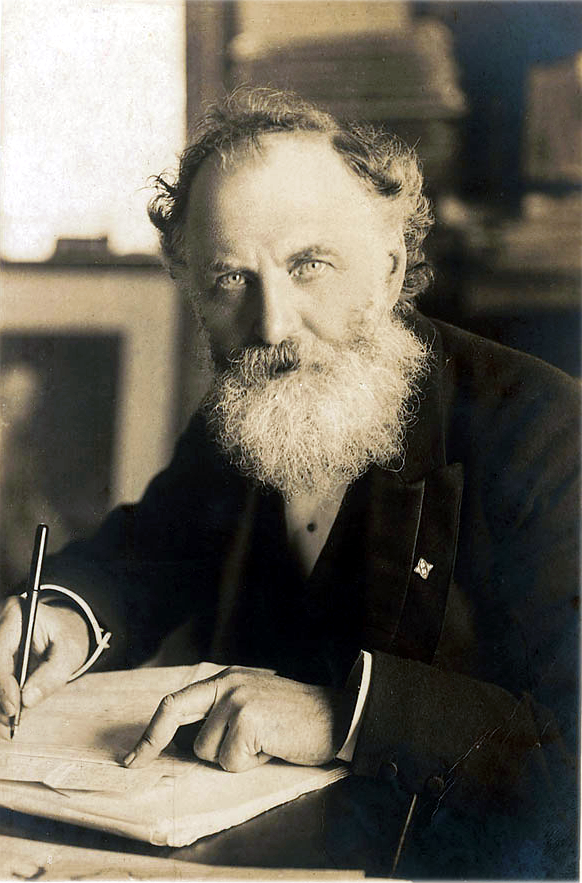
W.T. Stead

"How the Mail Steamer Went Down in Mid Atlantic by a Survivor" is a short story that was published in the 22 March 1886, issue of the Pall Mall Gazette by the English investigative journalist and newspaper editor William Thomas Stead. Stead included this editorial comment: "This is exactly what might take place and will take place if liners are sent to sea short of boats".

Stead was later a First Class passenger on the RMS Titanic, a British ocean liner which collided with an iceberg at the time of her maiden voyage on 14 April 1912, and he was one of approximately 1,500 people who perished in the disaster. Many people believe that this story foreshadows the Titanic tragedy based on its plot and the themes present.

== Plot ==
The story centers around an unnamed mail steamer sailing the Atlantic Ocean with passengers, crew, mail and baggage aboard. The main character, a sailor named Thompson, gives an account of his ocean voyage. After a brief scrap with a British Steerage passenger, Thompson goes out on deck later that night and takes a stroll on the Boat Deck. He worries about the number of lifeboats on board and their approximate capacity; about 400 people could be saved on a ship carrying 916 people altogether.

The next day, the steamer collides with a barque in a fog bank. The unnamed sailing ship sinks almost immediately, and the mail steamer begins to list sharply to starboard. Passengers begin to panic wildly, running hysterically about the deck and charging the few boats available. Panicked male passengers force their way into the lifeboats and attempt to lower them on their own, only to be thrown out at gunpoint by sailors and officers. The captain orders Thompson to organize the loading of a lifeboat, putting inside it mostly women, as well as four men to man it. The boat is charged by members of the ship's crew and carelessly lowered.

At this point only one small boat remains, with about 700 people still on board and the steamer listing dangerously. It clears the ship only moments before she sinks with just a few men inside. Thompson and hundreds of others are thrown into the sea. Another boat drifts by, and a man inside cautiously pulls Thompson aboard. Thompson mentions that he and the others in the boats are rescued, and that he is safe at home (albeit, without his kit). Those in the water presumably drown.

The last line of the story gives a disclaimer that the tale is merely an anecdote, employed to describe what would happen if a ship is put to sea without enough lifeboats for all her passengers, officers and crew.

== Stead's demise on the Titanic ==
Stead boarded the Titanic for a visit to the United States to take part in a peace congress at Carnegie Hall at the request of U.S. President William Howard Taft. Survivors of the Titanic reported very little about Stead's last hours. He chatted enthusiastically through the 11-course meal that fateful night, telling thrilling tales (including one about the cursed mummy of the British Museum), but then retired to bed at 10:30pm. After the ship struck the iceberg, Stead helped several women and children into the lifeboats, in an act "typical of his generosity, courage, and humanity", and gave his life jacket to another passenger.

A later sighting of Stead, by survivor Philip Mock, has him clinging to a raft with John Jacob Astor IV. "Their feet became frozen," reported Mock, "and they were compelled to release their hold. Both were drowned." William Stead's body was not recovered.

Stead had often claimed that he would die from either lynching or drowning. Stead also published another piece that gained greater significance in light of his fate on the Titanic. In 1892, Stead published a story titled "From the Old World to the New", in which a vessel, the Majestic, rescues survivors of another ship that collided with an iceberg.

== See also ==
- The Wreck of the Titan: Or, Futility – 1898 book with strong similarities to the Titanic
