= Gene H. Bell-Villada =

American dramatist

Gene H. Bell-Villada (born 1941 in Haiti) is an American literary critic, novelist, translator and memoirist, with strong interests in Latin American Writing, Modernism, and Magic Realism. His works include The Carlos Chadwick Mystery: A Novel of College Life and Political Terror, the short story collection The Pianist Who Liked Ayn Rand, and the critical studies Art for Art's Sake and the Literary Life, Borges And His Fiction: A Guide To His Mind And Art and Garcia Marquez: The Man And His Work. He holds a doctorate from Harvard University and has been a professor at Williams College since 1975.

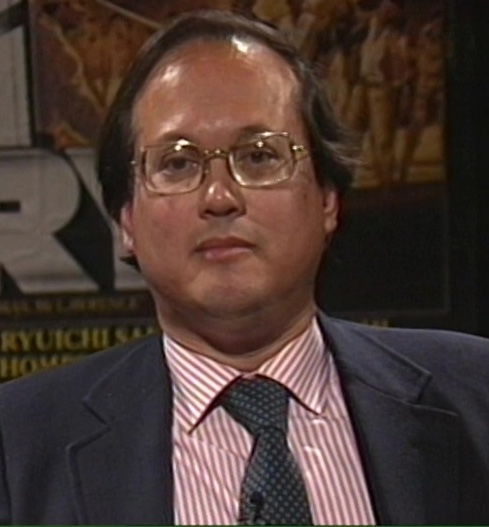
Bell-Villada on CUNY TV's Cinema Then, Cinema Now (1990)

Bell-Villada was born in Haiti to a Hawaiian mother and a Euro-American father. Besides Haiti he was raised in Puerto Rico, Venezuela and Cuba. He wrote of this experience in Overseas American: Growing Up Gringo in the Tropics.

His literary criticism is notable for its harsh views of Vladimir Nabokov. Art for Art's Sake and Literary Life was so negative in its assessment that Publishers Weekly described it as a "bilious analysis" of the Russian-born American writer. Bell-Villada explains the animosity by saying that he himself is a "lapsed disciple" of Nabokov.

== List of works by Bell-Villada ==
- Garcia Marquez: The Man and His Work (1990, second edition, revised and expanded, 2010)
- The Carlos Chadwick Mystery: A Novel of College Life and Political Terror (1990)
- The Pianist Who Liked Ayn Rand: A Novella and 13 Stories (1998)
- Art for Art's Sake (1998)
- Borges and His Fiction: A Guide to His Art and Mind (1981, second edition, revised and expanded, 2000)
- Overseas American: Growing Up Gringo in the Tropics (2005)
- On Nabokov, Ayn Rand and the Libertarian Mind (2013)
