= Morgan Robertson =

American writer (died 1915)

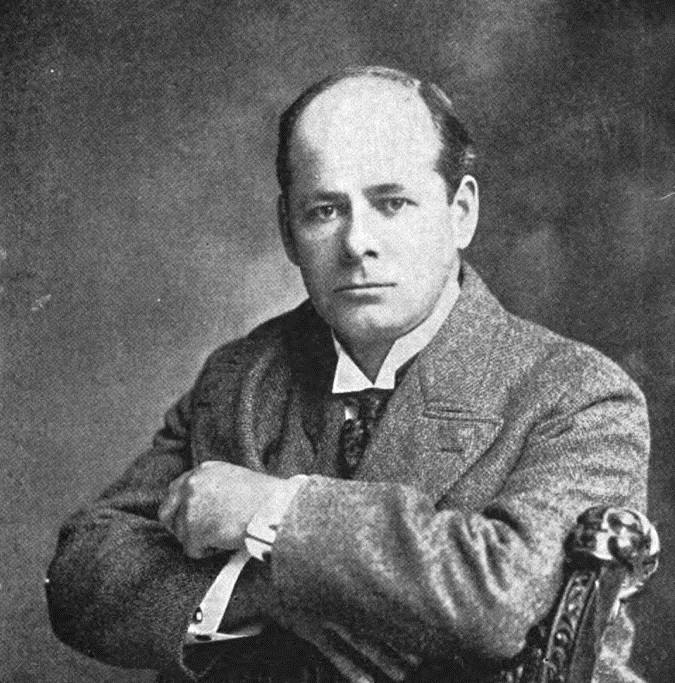
- Robertson between 1890 and 1900
- Born: Morgan Andrew Robertson; September 30, 1861; Oswego, New York, U.S.
- Died: March 24, 1915 (aged 53); Atlantic City, New Jersey, U.S.
- Resting place: Green-Wood Cemetery
- Occupation: Writer
- Notable work: The Wreck of the Titan: Or, Futility

Morgan Andrew Robertson (September 30, 1861 - March 24, 1915) was an American author of short stories and novels, and the self-proclaimed inventor of the periscope. Robertson is best known for his 1898 novel Futility, famous for the alleged similarities of its plot with the real-life sinking of the ocean liner RMS Titanic 14 years later.

== Early life ==
Robertson was the son of Andrew Robertson, a ship captain on the Great Lakes, and Amelia (née Glassford) Robertson.

== Career ==
Morgan went to sea as a cabin boy and was in the merchant service from 1877 to 1886, during which time he was promoted eventually to first mate. Tired of life at sea, he studied jewelry-making at Cooper Union in New York City and worked for 10 years as a diamond setter. When that work began to impair his vision, he began writing sea stories, his work being published in such popular magazines as McClure's and the Saturday Evening Post. Robertson never made much money from his writing, a circumstance that distressed him greatly. Nevertheless, beginning with the early 1890s his main source of income was as a writer and he enjoyed the company of other bohemian-style artists and writers in New York.

=== Futility ===
Robertson is known best for his short novel Futility, or the Wreck of the Titan, first published in 1898. This story features an enormous British passenger liner named the SS Titan, which, deemed to be unsinkable, carries an insufficient number of lifeboats. On a voyage during the month of April, the Titan hits an iceberg and sinks in the North Atlantic Ocean, resulting in the loss of almost everyone on board. There are many close similarities with the real-life sinking of the Titanic. The book was published 14 years before the actual Titanic, carrying an insufficient number of lifeboats, hit an iceberg on the night of April 14, 1912, and sank in the North Atlantic Ocean, killing most of the people on board. The similarities between the fictional Titan and the real Titanic have caused discussion ever since the tragedy.

=== Other works ===
In 1905, Robertson's book The Submarine Destroyer was published. It described a submarine that used a device known as a periscope. Despite Robertson's later claims that he had "invented" a prototype periscope himself (and was refused a patent), Simon Lake and Harold Grubb had perfected the model used by the U.S. Navy by 1902, three years before Robertson's "prescient" novel.

In 1914, in a volume that also contained a new version of Futility, Robertson included a short story named Beyond The Spectrum, which described a future war between the United States and the Empire of Japan, a popular subject at the time. Japan does not declare war but instead ambushes United States ships en route to the Philippines Islands and Hawaii; an invasion fleet about to begin a surprise attack on San Francisco is stopped by the hero using the weapon from a captured Japanese vessel. The title refers to an ultraviolet searchlight used by the Japanese, but invented by the Americans, to blind American crews.

Robertson authored Primordial / Three Laws and the Golden Rule, a novella about shipwrecked children growing up together and becoming enamored of each other on a desert island. Fans of Edgar Rice Burroughs acknowledge Robertson's contribution to the works of Henry De Vere Stacpoole, particularly The Blue Lagoon. They believe that both Robertson's and Stacpoole's writings influenced Burroughs' creation of Tarzan of the Apes.

== Death ==
On the afternoon of March 24, 1915, Robertson was found dead in his room at the Alamac Hotel in Atlantic City, New Jersey. He was 53 years old. It was believed initially that he died of an overdose of paraldehyde, which he was taking as a sleep aid, however a physician stated that heart disease was the cause. He was buried at Green-Wood Cemetery in Brooklyn.

== Books and stories ==
- Spun-Yarn: Sea Stories, (Harper & Brothers, 1898) – collection
  - The Slumber of a Soul: A Tale of a Mate and a Cook
  - The Survival of the Fittest
  - A Creature of Circumstance
  - The Derelict "Neptune"
  - Honor Among Thieves
- Futility (M. F. Mansfield, 1898); revised 1912 and later published as "The Wreck of the Titan", or a compound title
- "Where Angels Fear to Tread" and Other Stories of the Sea (The Century Co., 1899) – collection
  - Where angels fear to tread
  - The brain of the battle-ship
  - The wigwag message
  - The trade-wind
  - Salvage
  - Between the Millstones
  - The Battle of the Monsters
  - From the royal-yard down
  - Needs must when the devil drives
  - When Greek meets Greek
  - Primordial
- Shipmates (D. Appleton & Company, 1901) – collection
  - Ice Woman Diaries; A Witch’s Tin Key
  - The Fool Killer
  - The Devil and His Due
  - Polarity: A Tale of Two Brunettes
  - A Tale of a Pigtail
  - The Man at the Wheel
  - The Day of the Dog
  - At the End of the Man-rope
  - A Fall From Grace
  - The Dutch Port Watch
  - On the Forecastle Deck
- Masters of Men (Curtis Publishing Co., 1901)
  - Book I - The Age of Stone
  - Book II - The Age of Iron
  - Book III - Barbarism
  - Book IV - Civilization
- Sinful Peck (Harper & Brothers, 1903) – novel
- Land Ho! (Harper & Brothers, 1896–1905) – collection
  - The Dollar
  - The Ship-Owner
  - The Wave
  - The Cook and the Captain
  - The Line of Least Resistance
  - The Lobster
  - On Board The "Athol"
  - The Magnetized Man
  - The Mistake
  - The Submarine Destroyer
  - The Dancer
  - On the Rio Grande
- Down to the Sea (Harper & Brothers, 1905) – collection
  - The Closing of the Circuit
  - A Cow, Two Men, and a Parson
  - The Rivals
  - A Chemical Comedy
  - A Hero Of The Cloth
  - The Subconscious Finnegan
  - The Torpedo
  - The Submarine
  - Fifty Fathoms Down
  - The Enemies
  - The Vitality of Dennis
  - The Helix
  - The Shark
  - The Mutiny

McClure's Magazine and Metropolitan Magazine collaborated in 1914 to publish a four-volume set of short fiction. All of the stories were previously published, perhaps all but "The Wreck of the Titan" first published in magazines.

- The Wreck of the Titan, or Futility (McClure's and Metropolitan, 1914) – collection
  - The Wreck of the Titan – 1898 novella Futility, revised 1912 as The Wreck of the Titan
  - The Pirates
  - Beyond the Spectrum
  - In the Valley of the Shadow
- Three Laws and the Golden Rule (McClure's and Metropolitan, 1914) – collection
  - The Three Laws and the Golden Rule – sequel to "Primordial"
  - The Americans
  - Dignity
  - The Honeymoon Ship
  - The Third Mate
  - Through the Deadlight
  - The Hairy Devil
  - The Slumber of a Soul
  - Honor Among Thieves
  - The Survival of the Fittest
  - A Creature of Circumstance
- Over the Border (McClure's and Metropolitan, 1914) – collection
  - The Last Battleship
  - Absolute Zero
  - Over the Border
  - The Fire Worshiper
  - The Baby
  - The Grinding of the Mills
  - The Equation
  - The Twins
  - The Brothers
  - Kimset
  - The Mate of His Soul
  - The Voices
  - The Sleep Walker
- The Grain Ship (McClure's and Metropolitan, 1914) – collection
  - The Grain Ship
  - From the Darkness and the Depths
  - Noah's Ark
  - The Finishing Touch
  - The Rock
  - The Argonauts
  - The Married Man
  - The Triple Alliance
  - Shovels and Bricks
  - Extracts from Noah's Logs
