= The Maiden Tribute of Modern Babylon =

1885 newspaper articles in the Pall Mall Gazette

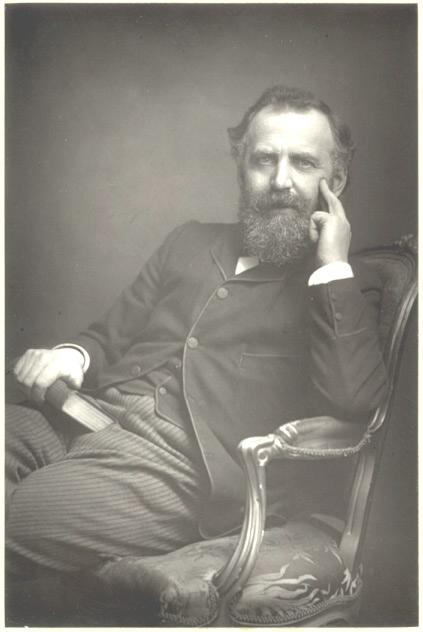
William Thomas Stead

"The Maiden Tribute of Modern Babylon" was a series of newspaper articles on child prostitution that appeared in The Pall Mall Gazette in July 1885. Written by the paper's crusading editor W. T. Stead, the series was a tour de force of Victorian journalism. With sensational crossheads, such as "The Violation of Virgins" and "Strapping Girls Down", the Maiden Tribute achieved, as a consequence, the implementation of the Criminal Law Amendment Act 1885, which raised the age of consent for girls from 13 to 16.

== Overview ==
The first instalment took up six pages. Stead attacked vice with eye-catching subheadings: "The Violation of Virgins", "The Confessions of a Brothel-Keeper", "How Girls Were Bought and Ruined". He argued that, while consensual adult behaviour was a matter of private morality and not a law enforcement issue, issues rife in London existed that did require legislative prohibition, listing five main areas where the law should intervene:

1. "The sale and purchase and violation of children.
2. The procuration of virgins.
3. The entrapping and ruin of women.
4. The international slave trade in girls.
5. Atrocities, brutalities, and "unnatural crimes."

The theme of "Maiden Tribute" was child prostitution, the abduction, procurement and sale of young English virgins to Continental "pleasure palaces". Stead took his readers to the labyrinthine streets of London (intentionally recalling the Greek myth) to its darker side, exposing the flesh trade while exposing the corruption of those officials who not only turned a blind eye but also condoned such abuse. In particular, he drew a distinction between sexual immorality and sexual criminality, and criticized those members of Parliament who were responsible for the Bill's impending "extinction in the House of Commons" and hinted that they might have personal reasons to block any changes in the law.

Describing himself as an "investigator" rather than an "informer", Stead stated that he would disclose actual names and identifying details only to the two UK Archbishops, one MP, two members of the House of Lords active in criminal legislation or child protection, and a past director of the CID.

=== Contents of the articles ===
The disclosure proper began in the 6 July publication, in which Stead revealed that he had asked if genuine maiden virgins could be procured, and being told it was so, asked whether such girls were willing and consensual, or aware of the intentions planned for them:

"But," I continued, "are these maids willing or unwilling parties to the transaction–that is, are they really maiden, not merely in being each a virgo intacta in the physical sense, but as being chaste girls who are not consenting parties to their seduction?"

He looked surprised at my question, and then replied emphatically: "Of course they are rarely willing, and as a rule they do not know what they are coming for."

"But," I said in amazement, "then do you mean to tell me that in very truth actual rapes, in the legal sense of the word, are constantly being perpetrated in London on unwilling virgins, purveyed and procured to rich men at so much a head by keepers of brothels?"

"Certainly," said he, "there is not a doubt of it."

"Why," I exclaimed, "the very thought is enough to raise hell."

"It is true," he said; "and although it ought to raise hell, it does not even raise the neighbours."

"But do the girls cry out?"

"Of course they do. But what avails screaming in a quiet bedroom? Remember, the utmost limit of howling or excessively violent screaming, such as a man or woman would make if actual murder was being attempted, is only two minutes, and the limit of screaming of any kind is only five ... But suppose the screams continue and you get uneasy, you begin to think whether you should not do something? Before you have made up your mind and got dressed the screams cease, and you think you were a fool for your pains ... Once a girl gets into such a house she is almost helpless, and may be ravished with comparative safety".

Stead commented that "Children of twelve and thirteen cannot offer any serious resistance. They only dimly comprehend what it all means. Their mothers sometimes consent to their seduction for the sake of the price paid by their seducer. The child goes to the introducing house as a sheep to the shambles. Once there, she is compelled to go through with it. No matter how brutal the man may be, she cannot escape". A madam confirmed the story for him, stating of one girl that she was rendered unconscious beforehand, and then coercively given the choice to continue or be homeless afterwards:

"I engaged her to be my little maid at the lodgings where I was staying. The very next day I took her off with me to London and her mother never saw her again. What became of her? A gentleman paid me £13 for the first of her, soon after she came to town. She was asleep when he did it–sound asleep. To tell the truth, she was drugged. It is often done. I gave her a drowse. It is a mixture of laudanum and something else. Sometimes chloroform is used, but I always used either snuff or laudanum. We call it drowse or black draught, and they lie almost as if dead, and the girl never knows what has happened till morning. And then? Oh! then she cries a great deal from pain, but she is 'mazed, and hardly knows what has happened except that she can hardly move from pain. Of course we tell her it is all right; all girls have to go through it some time, that she is through it now without knowing it, and that it is no use crying. It will never be undone for all the crying in the world. She must now do as the others do. She can live like a lady, do as she pleases, have the best of all that is going, and enjoy herself all day. If she objects, I scold her and tell her she has lost her character, no one will take her in; I will have to turn her out on the streets as a bad and ungrateful girl. The result is that in nine cases out of ten, or ninety-nine out of a hundred, the child, who is usually under fifteen, frightened and friendless, her head aching with the effect of the drowse and full of pain and horror, gives up all hope, and in a week she is one of the attractions of the house."

Stead quoted a former brothel-keeper who confirmed the nature of the trade:

"Maids, as you call them – fresh girls as we know them in the trade – are constantly in request, and a keeper who knows his business has his eyes open in all directions, his stock of girls is constantly getting used up, and needs replenishing, and he has to be on the alert for likely "marks" to keep up the reputation of his house. I have been in my time a good deal about the country on these errands. The getting of fresh girls takes time, but it is simple and easy enough when, once you are in it. I have gone and courted girls in the country under all kinds of disguises, occasionally assuming the dress of a parson, and made them believe that I intended to marry them, and so got them in my power to please a good customer. How is it done? Why, after courting my girl for a time, I propose to bring her to London to see the sights. I bring her up, take her here and there, giving her plenty to eat and drink–especially drink. I take her to the theatre, and then I contrive it so that she loses her last train. By this time she is very tired, a little dazed with the drink and excitement, and very frightened at being left in town with no friends".

"I offer her nice lodgings for the night: she goes to bed in my house, and then the affair is managed. My client gets his maid, I get my £10 or £20 commission, and in the morning the girl, who has lost her character, and dare not go home, in all probability will do as the others do, and become one of my "marks"–that is, she will make her living in the streets, to the advantage of my house. The brothel keeper's profit is, first, the commission down for the price of a maid, and secondly, the continuous profit of the addition of a newly seduced, attractive girl to his establishment. That is a fair sample case of the way in which we recruit. Another very simple mode of supplying maids is by breeding them. Many women who are on the streets have female children. They are worth keeping. When they get to be twelve or thirteen they become merchantable. For a very likely "mark" of this kind you may get as much as £20 or £40".

=== Ramifications ===
==== Background ====
The 'Tribute' series led to the passage of the Criminal Law Amendment Act 1885, also known as the 'Stead Act' or 'Stead's Act'.

From its inception, one of the goals of the series was to influence public policy. W. T. Stead wrote that its object was "to pass a new law, and not to pillory individuals, there was no need to mention names."

==== Aftermath ====
Stead and several of his accomplices were later brought to trial as a result of the unlawful investigative methods they used (see the Eliza Armstrong case) and Stead himself served three months in prison. Stead's reports were, according to Roland Pearsall, "using the weapons of pornography to right a wrong; it was the death knell of responsible journalism".

Stead's account was widely translated and the revelation of "padded rooms for the purpose of stifling the cries of the tortured victims of lust and brutality" and the symbolic figure of "The Minotaur of London" confirmed European observers' worst imaginings about "Le Sadisme anglais" and inspired erotic writers to write of similar scenes set in London or involving sadistic English gentlemen. Such writers include Gabriele D'Annunzio in Il Piacere, Paul-Jean Toulet in Monsieur de Paur (1898), Octave Mirbeau in Jardin des Supplices (1899) and Jean Lorrain in Monsieur de Phocas (1901).

The title evokes the Greek myth of the Minotaur's virgins tribute. Stead's allegory about the Minotaur and human sacrifice inspired George Frederic Watts to create the painting The Minotaur in 1885.

== See also ==
- White slave trade affair
