= The Wreck of the Titan: Or, Futility =

1898 novella by Morgan Robertson

Futility
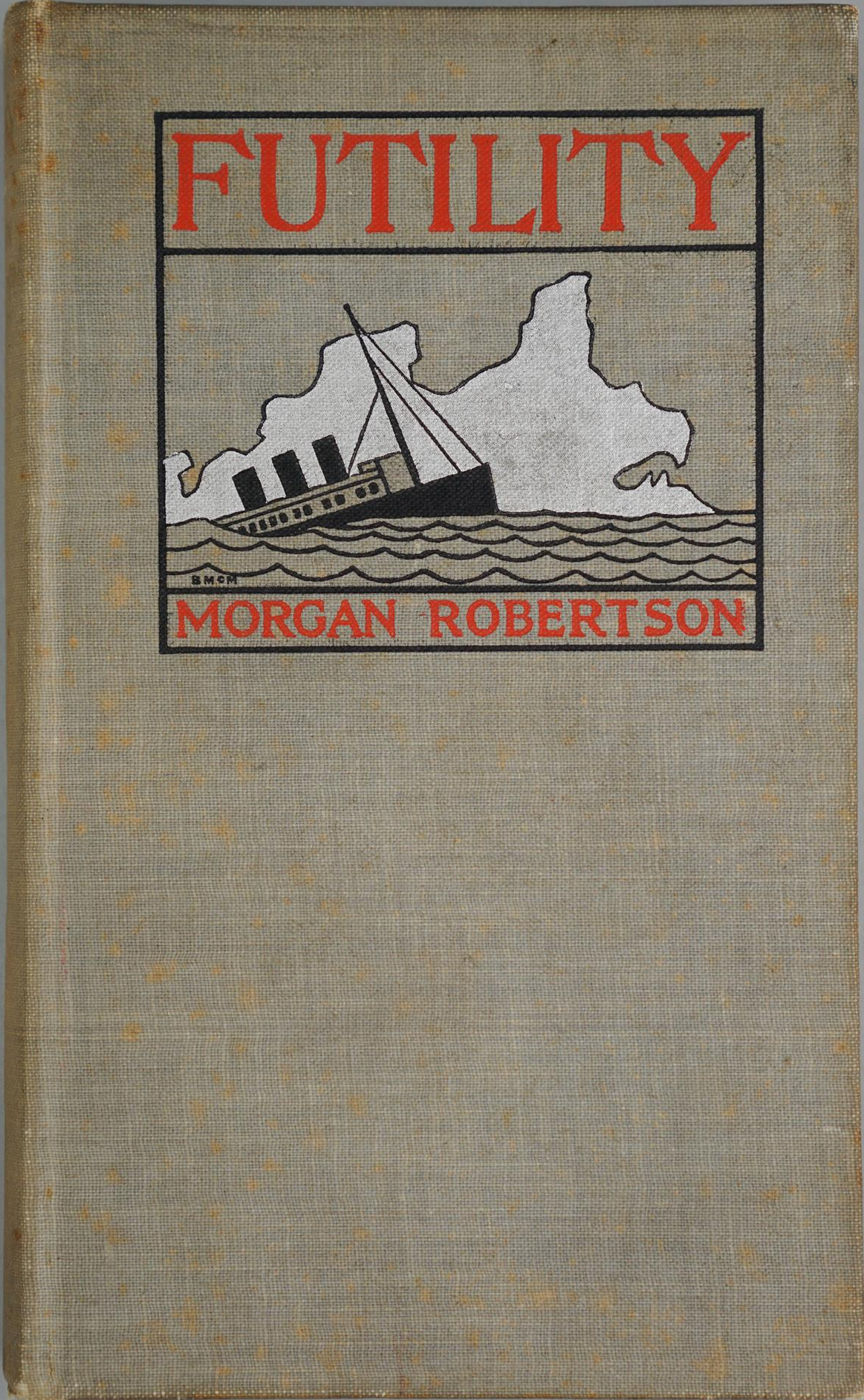
- First edition, 1898
- Author: Morgan Robertson
- Language: English
- Genre: Nautical fiction
- Publisher: M. F. Mansfield
- Publication date: 1898
- Publication place: United States
- Media type: Novella
- LC Class: PS2719.R38

Futility is a novella written by American author Morgan Robertson, first published in 1898. It features a fictional American ocean liner named Titan that sinks in the North Atlantic Ocean after striking an iceberg. The Titan and its sinking were noted for their similarities to the real-life passenger ship RMS Titanic and its sinking 14 years later.

Following the sinking of the Titanic, the novel was reissued with a number of changes, particularly to the ship's displacement, and was renamed Futility, or The Wreck of the Titan.

== Plot ==
The first half of Futility introduces the Titan, described as the longest and fastest ship in the world that is also considered unsinkable, and the hero John Rowland, a disgraced former US Navy officer who was dismissed from the service. Now an alcoholic, he works as a deckhand on the Titan.

One night, while sailing between America and Ireland, the Titan crashes into a smaller ship at full speed in fog, splitting it in half. Rowland, who witnessed the collision while on lookout, is offered a bribe by the captain for his silence, but refuses and vows to expose the deed once in port. The captain and the officers attempt to discredit Rowland's testimony by drugging him.

The next night, the ship hits an iceberg and capsizes, and only 13 people survive. Rowland saves the young daughter of a former lover by jumping onto the iceberg with her. The pair find a lifeboat washed up on the iceberg, and Rowland also fights and kills an attacking polar bear. They are rescued eventually by a passing ship and brought back to England.

Back in England, Rowland tells of the events of the voyage, including the destruction of the smaller ship, the attempted cover-up and drugging by the captain and officers (who have also survived) and the ordeal on the iceberg to an insurance underwriter responsible for insuring both ships. Rowland refuses to testify before court and instead goes to New York with the girl.

Once there, the girl is recovered by her mother and Rowland is arrested for her kidnapping. A sympathetic magistrate discharges him and rebukes the mother for being unsympathetic to her daughter's savior. Rowland then begins living alone.

In a brief final chapter covering several years, Rowland progresses from a homeless and largely anonymous fisherman to a desk job and finally, two years after passing a civil service exam, to "a lucrative position under the Government".

The second edition of 1912, included a follow-up alternative ending: Rowland receives a letter from the mother (who congratulates him and pleads for him to visit her) and from the girl.

== Similarities to the Titanic ==
Although the novel was written before the RMS Titanic was even conceived, there were some similarities between the fictional and real-life versions. Like the Titanic, the fictional ship sank after wrecking on an iceberg in April in the North Atlantic Ocean, and there were not enough lifeboats for all the passengers. The Titan might have survived a head-on collision with the iceberg, but a glancing encounter did more fatal damage.

After the Titanic's sinking, some people credited Robertson with precognition and clairvoyance, which he denied. Scholars attribute the similarities to Robertson's extensive knowledge of shipbuilding and maritime trends.

The fictional ship is still named the Titan in the original 1898 edition (although the ship's name was added to the cover of the book after the sinking of the Titanic).

== In popular culture ==
- Walter Lord's book A Night to Remember (1955), relating the Titanic's wreck, begins with a summary of Robertson's novel.
- The American anthology series Alcoa Presents One Step Beyond referred to the novel as an example of precognition in the second episode of its first season entitled, "Night of April 14th" (1959).
- The American anthology series Beyond Belief: Fact or Fiction used the story in its episode eleven segment entitled "Titan" (1998).
- The novel can be found sitting on Carlson's armchair in the 1996 video game Titanic: Adventure Out of Time.
- The 2010 Doctor Who audio drama The Wreck of the Titan by Barnaby Edwards connects the writing of Futility to the Titanic story through time travel.
- Martin Gardner's book The Wreck of the Titanic Foretold? (1986).
- In The League of Extraordinary Gentlemen fictional universe, the Titan serves as the Titanic's fictional counterpart.
- Robertson's book is referenced in the 2009 video game Nine Hours, Nine Persons, Nine Doors in regard to the game's setting.
- Dan Brown's book The Secret of Secrets (2025), refers to the writing of Futility as an example of precognition of the Titanic's wreck.

== See also ==
- List of fictional ships
- Synchronicity
- "How the Mail Steamer Went Down in Mid Atlantic by a Survivor" – 1886 short story by W. T. Stead to warn about ships which lack lifeboat capacity. Stead, a passenger on the Titanic when it sank in 1912, died in the event.
