= Norah Borges =

Argentine artist, art critic (1901–1998)

- Born: Leonor Fanny Borges Acevedo; March 4, 1901; Palermo, Buenos Aires, Argentina
- Died: July 20, 1998 (aged 97); Buenos Aires, Argentina

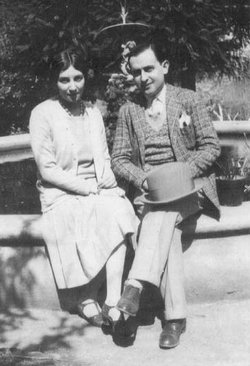
Norah Borges and Guillermo de la Torre (1928)

Leonor Fanny "Norah" Borges Acevedo (March 4, 1901 – July 20, 1998), was an Argentine visual artist and art critic, member of the Florida group, and sister of the Argentine writer Jorge Luis Borges.

== Early life and source of nickname ==
She was the daughter of a lawyer, Dr. Jorge Guillermo Borges and Leonor Acevedo Suárez. Leonor was given the name Norah by her older brother, Jorge Luis Borges. Of his sister, Jorge wrote:

In all of our games she was always el caudillo, I the slow, timid, submissive one. She climbed to the top of the roof, traipsed through the trees, and I followed along with more fear than enthusiasm. —Jorge Luis Borges, Norah

Growing up, Norah lived in the shadow of her famous brother. It wasn't until later in life that she emerged from her brother's shadow and gained her own personal popularity. As a child, she moved with her family to Switzerland to treat the progressive blindness of her father. She studied with the classical sculptor Maurice Sarkisoff at the École des Beaux-Arts of Geneva. After three years of school, Norah was told by Professor Sarkisoff to leave the ways of the academy to grow in her individual style. In Lugano she studied with Arnaldo Bossi and was close to German expressionists such as Ernst Ludwig Kirchner. With Bossi, Borges learned the art of woodcutting and the aesthetics of expressionism.

== Early career ==
In Switzerland, Borges wrote and illustrated her first poetry book, Notas lejanas (1915). After its publication, Borges and her family hoped to return to Argentina, but their stay in Europe was extended by four years because of the First World War. During this time, Borges saw much of Europe. First, she visited Provence and was so deeply impressed by Nîmes that she dedicated some of her later work to her travels there. After traveling through Provence, she moved to Spain, where she furthered her studies and participated in the Avant-Garde movement. In Spain, Borges first visited Barcelona, and then, in 1919, moved to Palma, Mallorca. In Palma, she studied under Sven Westman and collaborated with her brother on the magazine Baleares.

Next she visited Sevilla, where she became a part of the vanguard of Ultraísmo, published her work in magazines like Grecia (1918-1920), Ultra, Tableros y Reflector, and in 1920 she illustrated the cover of El jardin de centauro (The Garden of the Centaur), a book of poems by Adriano del Valle. In the Spanish literary magazine, Grecia, she was asked to redesign the graphic design elements of four covers and a new header for their opening page at the age of eighteen. After leaving Sevilla, she passed through Granada and then finally came to Madrid, where she studied with the painter Julio Romero de Torres. Here she befriended the poet Juan Ramón Jiménez. She illustrated a number of his books and dedicated a portrait to him in her book Españoles de tres mundos.

In March 1921, Borges returned by boat to Buenos Aires. As a young painter, she aligned herself with the vanguard artists of the Florida group. Her work in Prisma (1921) reflects the ultraist (anti-modernist) ideas of the group, but her illustrations for magazines such as Mural, Proa (1924-1926) and Martín Fierro, and her illustrations in the first edition of the poetry book Fervor de Buenos Aires by Jorge Luis Borges (1923) reveal the influence of the Cubism that she had begun to assimilate with her French contacts in Spain. In 1923, the French surrealist magazine Manomètre, and, in 1924, Martín Fierro published her paintings. In the September-October 1924 issue of Martin Fierro, Borges' first collection of poems called Calle de la tarde were displayed. Also in 1924, Borges created a woodcut cover for the Mexican journal, Antena. Two years later, two of her illustrations were in the magazine Amauta. When creating for Amauta, she was working underneath José Carlos Mariátegui, who used illustration as a tool to help women artists in Latin American advertise their artwork.

In 1926, she displayed 75 works (oils, woodcarvings, drawings, water-colorings, and tapestries) in the Asociación Amigos del Arte exhibition. In 1928, she married the writer and art critic Guillermo de Torre, a student of the Ultraist movement and an expert on Avant-Garde art and literature, whom she had met in Spain when she was 19 years old. They had two children.

In the Second World War, she became a vocal supporter of Junta de la Victoria, an association of anti-fascist feminists in Argentina directed by Cora Ratto de Sadosky and Ana Rosa Schlieper de Martínez Guerrero. Also included in the group were the writer María Rosa Oliver, the photographer Annemarie Heinrich, the psychoanalyst Mimí Langer, the artist Raquel Forner, and the poet Silvina Ocampo.

== Post-war career ==
After the war, Norah spent one month with her mother Leo Acevedo in a women's prison for uttering cries against the president of Argentina Juan Perón, deepening the aversion that her brother felt for the Argentine political party Partido Justicialista and its founder Perón. After her release, Norah illustrated her brother's book Cuaderno San Martin, as she had done with his earlier works like Luna de enfrente and Fervor de Buenos Aires, and Las invitadas (1961) and Autobiografia de Irene (1962) by Silvina Ocampo. Norah wrote as an art critic for Anales de Buenos Aires under the pseudonym Manuel Pinedo. She worked as a journalist and painter until her death in 1998, but she gave away much of her work and did not care for regular art exhibitions.

Norah's arrest was odd because her paintings did not seem to be political. Even after her arrest and association with the Sur she refused to make statements about her political views. Norah's protest and imprisonment were eventually represented in her art, such as the painting Recuerdos de la prisión (1948-1949). Her later paintings were considered to be more "female-centered".

In 1942, a version of Platero y yo by Juan Ramón Jiménez was published with her illustrations and vignettes. She also worked as a graphic artist on other books by Spanish emigrants in Argentina, including Ramón Gómez de la Serna, Rafael Alberti, and León Felipe, and illustrated the works of her brother and other Argentine writers such as Victoria Ocampo, Adolfo Bioy Casares, Norah Lange, and Julio Cortázar. She designed the scenery for a play by Federico García Lorca using the techniques of oil, watercolor, engraving, woodcut, and drawings in ink and pencil.

== Death and burial ==
She died in Buenos Aires in 1998, aged 97, and was buried in the family vault in the La Recoleta Cemetery.
