= Francisco Borges =

19th-century Argentine military officer

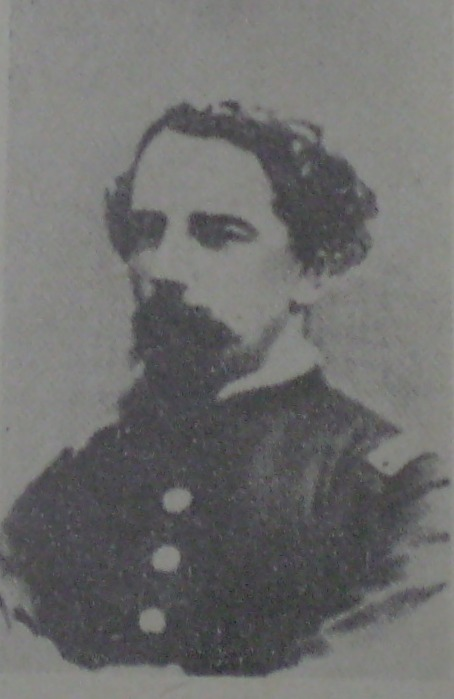
- Born: November 16, 1835; Montevideo, Uruguay
- Died: November 26, 1874 (aged 39); La Verde, Nueve de Julio, Argentina
- Occupation: Military officer
- Years active: 1850s–1874
- Known for: Participation in Argentine civil wars, Battle of La Verde
- Spouse: Frances Anne Haslam Arnett (m. 1871–1874)
- Children: Jorge Guillermo Borges Haslam

Francisco Isidro Borges Lafinur (born November 16, 1835, in Montevideo – died November 26, 1874, in La Verde) was an Argentine military officer of Uruguayan birth, the son of Argentine political exiles. He served in frontier campaigns against Indigenous groups and fought in the Paraguayan War.

== Military career ==
Francisco Borges joined the defense forces during the Siege of Montevideo at seventeen, serving as an artillery officer. He later joined the Ejército Grande and fought in the Battle of Caseros. Afterward, he settled in Buenos Aires and took part in the city's defense during the 1853 siege by federalist leader Hilario Lagos.

In 1857, Borges served as one of the artillery commanders in a campaign against Indigenous groups led by Bartolomé Mitre, which ended in military failure. He remained stationed on the southern frontier, commanding cavalry forces in ongoing campaigns against the native populations.

He fought in the Battle of Cepeda (1859) and the Battle of Pavón, as well as in the conquest of several interior provinces, particularly Córdoba. He was stationed in Córdoba for nearly a year before returning to the frontier to resume military operations against Indigenous resistance.

Under General Wenceslao Paunero, Borges participated in the Paraguayan War, distinguishing himself in the battles of Yatay, Estero Bellaco, Tuyutí, Boquerón (1866), and Tuyú Cué.

In 1868, he joined the national army's campaign against the forces of General Nicanor Cáceres, who supported the constitutional governor of the province of Corrientes. For his service, Borges was promoted to the rank of colonel.

In 1870, he took part in the campaign against the last federalist caudillo, Ricardo López Jordán, then governor of Entre Ríos Province. Borges did not see major combat in that campaign, apart from minor skirmishes during the defense of the city of Paraná, which was occupied by national forces.

He was later appointed commander of part of the southern frontier, where he maintained peace with Indigenous communities more through trust and diplomacy than by force. Borges played a key role in the Battle of San Carlos against the powerful Mapuche chief Calfucurá; his swift maneuvers were instrumental in securing victory over the "Pampas" tribes. He later requested a leave from his post on the frontier to help suppress López Jordán's second rebellion, but once again did not reach the battlefield in time to engage.

== Revolution of 1874 ==
In 1874, when the liberals were defeated by the presidential candidate of the National Autonomist Party, Nicolás Avellaneda, Borges joined the Mitrist uprising against him. He set the condition that the revolution should only begin after President Avellaneda had assumed office—whom they considered illegitimate—and not during the presidency of Sarmiento. Initially, this condition was to be respected, but government orders requiring suspected rebel officers to hand their troops over to loyalists forced the revolution to start earlier than planned. When the government ordered Borges to hand his regiment over to Colonel Julio Campos, he did so without resistance, determined not to rebel against Sarmiento.

He only joined the revolutionaries the day after Sarmiento left office, which earned him the contempt of his comrades, while the government still viewed him as a rebel. He was placed in command of a cavalry force that lacked both experience and training.

During the Battle of La Verde, seeing that Mitre’s army was being crushed and the battle already lost, Borges broke away from his men and charged directly at the firing line of Lieutenant Colonel José Inocencio Arias. He was mortally wounded and died a few hours later in Mitre's camp.

Legend has it that he deliberately sought death, misunderstood by both sides for refusing to rebel prematurely.

His grandson, the Argentine writer Jorge Luis Borges, dedicated a poem to him titled To Colonel Francisco Borges.

== Bibliography ==
- López Mato, Omar, 1874: Historia de la revolución olvidada, Ed. Olmo, s/f.
- Ras, Norberto, La guerra por las vacas, Ed. Galerna, Bs. As., 2006.
- Scenna, Miguel Ángel, 1874: Mitre contra Avellaneda, Revista Todo es Historia, nro. 167.
- Scenna, Miguel Ángel, San Carlos: la última batalla de Calfucurá, Revista Todo es Historia, nro. 59.
- Díaz Gavier, Mario, En tres meses en Asunción, Ediciones del Boulevard, Córdoba, 2005.
- Castello, Antonio Emilio, Historia de Corrientes, Ed. Plus Ultra, Bs. As., 1991.
