= Adrogue, con ilustraciones de Norah Borges =

Poetry book by Jorge Luis Borges

First edition

Adrogué, con ilustraciones de Norah Borges (1977) is a volume of poetry by Jorge Luis Borges, illustrated by his sister Norah Borges, about the city of Adrogué. It was born from a lecture given by Borges about "Adrogué in his books" at the celebration of the first "Week of Culture" of the Almirante Brown Partido in 1977. In addition to the cover art, there are eight full page illustrations.

Borges' love of Adrogué dates to his childhood, when he enjoyed many summers there. References to the city can be recognized in numerous poems when he writes about labyrinthine courtyards, sidewalks, cisterns, and idyllic memories of his youth.

In the prologue by Roy Bartholomew, Borges is quoted as saying:

Wherever in the world I might sense the smell of gum trees, I feel as if I had been taken back to Adrogué. And that is exactly what Adrogué was: a large and quiet maze of streets surrounded by lush trees and country houses, a maze of many peaceful nights that my parents liked to traverse. Country houses in which you could guess how life was behind those country houses. In some way, I have always been there, I am always here. You take the places with yourself, the places are within yourself. I am still among the gum trees and labyrinths, that place where you can easily get lost. I guess you might as well get lost in Paradise. Bizarre statues turn pretty, a ruin that is not a ruin, a tennis court. And then, in the very Las Delicias Hotel, a big room with mirrors. I have certainly found myself in those infinite looking glasses. Many arguments, many scenes, many poems that I imagined were born in Adrogué or were fixed in Adrogué. Whenever I talk about gardens, whenever I talk about trees, I am in Adrogué; I have thought about that city, it is unnecessary to name it.

The volume is a limited edition by Ediciones Adrogué. The library of the partido keeps a copy.

== Contents ==
- Prologo by Roy Bartholomew, dated 30 September 1977
- Las Poemas
- Adrogué
- La Pesadilla
- El Tango
- La Luna - a Maria Kodama
- Llaneza - a Haydee Lange
- Alexandria, 641 A.D.
- Susana Bombal
- Sueña Alonso Quijano
- Elvira de Alvear
- A Mi Padre
- Baruch Spinoza
- Las Causas
- Pagina para Recordar al Colonel Suarez Vencedor en Junin

== Reissue ==
On the occasion of the writer's 112th anniversary, the municipality of Almirante Brown reissued a free edition of the book with a selection of poems from the original, to which accounts by locals who met Borges were added.
