= Don Herold =

American cartoonist

- Born: July 9, 1889; Bloomfield, Indiana, U.S.
- Died: June 1, 1966 (aged 76); Vero Beach, Florida
- Education: Art Institute of Chicago until 1908 when he transferred to the Indiana University
- Occupations: Cartoonist, illustrator, humorist, writer
- Spouse: Katherine Porter Brown (m. 1916)

Don Herold (July 9, 1889 – June 1, 1966) was an American humorist, writer, illustrator, and cartoonist who wrote and illustrated many books and was a contributor to national magazines.

== Biography ==
He was born in Bloomfield, Indiana, to Otto F. Herold and Clara Dyer Herold. He graduated from high school in 1907 and went on to the Art Institute of Chicago until 1908 when he transferred to the Indiana University. He was a member of the Phi Delta Theta fraternity and in 1913 he graduated with an AB degree. He married Katherine Porter Brown on August 12, 1916, and they had two children; one of whom was the writer Doris Herold Lund. He lived in Los Angeles in the 1920s and 1930s and New York City from 1940 to 1962. He died in Vero Beach, Florida.

Perhaps one of his more famous works is a poem called "I'd Pick More Daisies" which was published in Reader's Digest in 1953. It was also known as "If I had My Life to Live over", which was translated to Spanish as "Instantes" and misattributed to Jorge Luis Borges. The real poem, written by Don Herold, was also misattributed to Nadine Stair.

== Publications ==
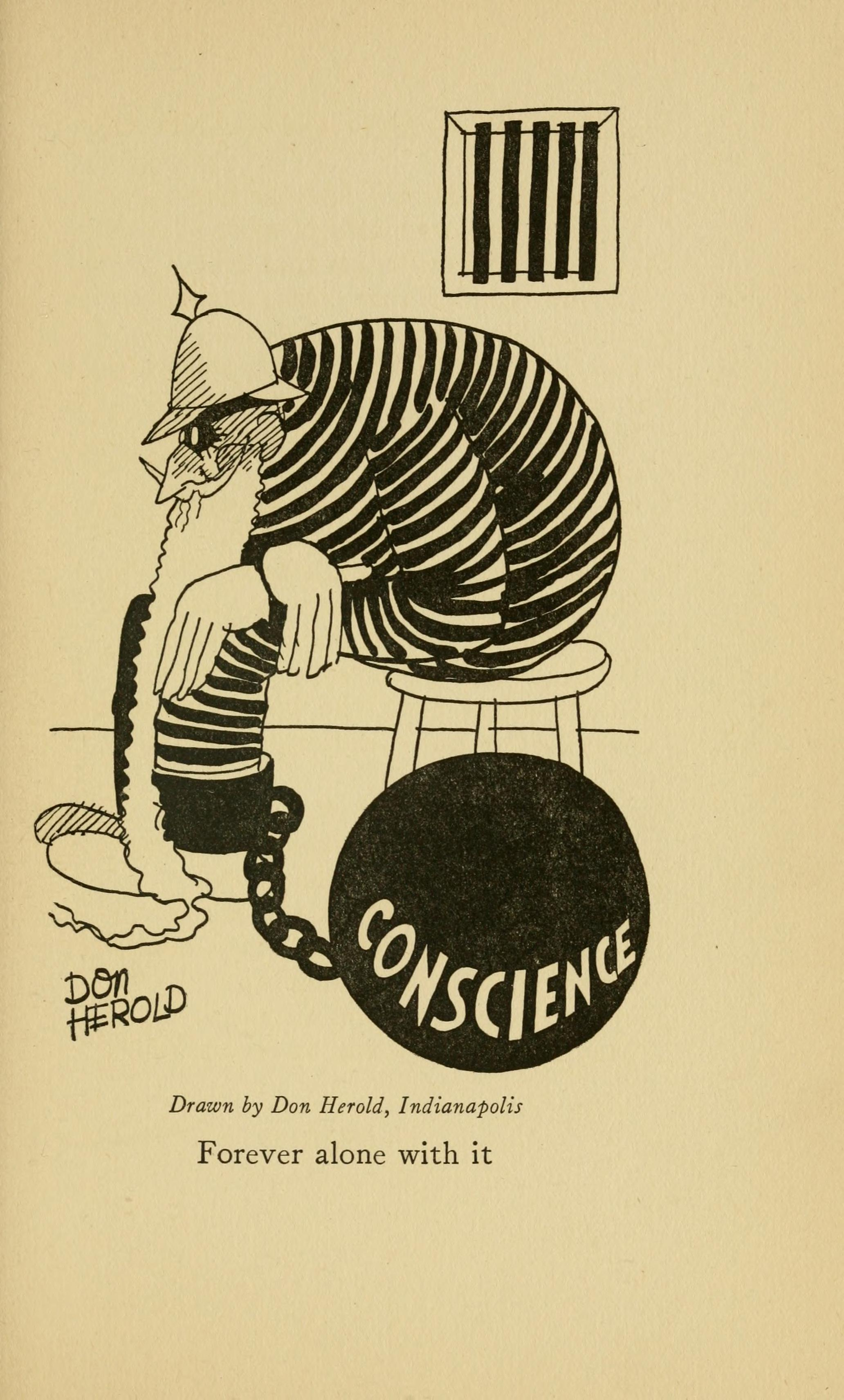
Conscience, cartoon by Don Herald, in "Long live the Kaiser"-! Verses and drawings by the American press humorists (1917)

- A Lap Full of Fun; Don Herold Book no.1 (1919) Mellett Publishing Co.
- So Human (1924)
- Bigger and Better (1924)
- There Ought to be a Law (1926)
- Our Compassionate Goldfish (1927)
- Strange Bedfellows (1930)
- Doing Europe and Vice-Versa (1931)
- How to Choose a Slide Rule (1940, 1952)
- Enlarging Is Thrilling or The Joy of Making Big Ones Out of Little Ones (1945)
- Typographical Handbook (1946)
- Love That Golf (1952)
- Drunks are Driving Me to Drink (1953)
- The Happy Hypochondriac (1962)
- Humor in Advertising (1963)
- Adventures in Golf (1965)
