= Leonor Acevedo Suárez =

Mother of Jorge Luis Borges

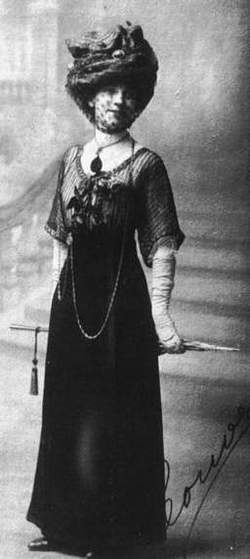
Leonor Acevedo, circa 1900

Leonor Rita Acevedo Suárez (May 22, 1876 – July 8, 1975) was the mother of the Argentine author Jorge Luis Borges, and a major figure in his life and work.

== Biography ==
Leonor Rita Acevedo Suárez was born in Argentina, the daughter of Isidoro Acevedo Laprida (1828-?) and Leonor Suárez Haedo de Acevedo (1837–1918). She married Jorge Guillermo Borges, a lawyer with literary aspirations, by whom she had two children: Jorge Luis and Norah. As her husband's sight deteriorated, she assisted him with his reading and dictation, services which she would later provide to her son as he succumbed to the same hereditary blindness.

She produced several translations from English and French. Her output includes "The Woman Who Rode Away" by D. H. Lawrence, The Human Comedy by William Saroyan and Faulkner's If I Forget Thee, Jerusalem, among other works.

Leonor was known for her forceful personality and vitality. Tomás Eloy Martínez writes that when Borges visited the University of Texas in Austin in 1961, his mother was eighty-five but appeared much younger; as she walked about on her son's arm, many students assumed she was the author's wife.

Leonor Acevedo Suárez died in 1975, aged 99. At her wake, a woman paid her respects and remarked, "Poor little Leonor, to die so close to turning a hundred. If only she'd waited a little longer..." to which Borges replied, "I see, madam, that you're a devotee of the decimal system."
