= Yo, Judío =

1934 essay by Jorge Luis Borges

- Created: 1934
- Author: Jorge Luis Borges
- Media type: Essay
- Subject: Antisemitism

Yo, Judío (Me, a Jew) is a 1934 essay about antisemitism by the Argentine writer Jorge Luis Borges.

== Contents ==
In 1934, Argentine ultra-nationalists affiliated with the magazine Crisol, sympathetic to Adolf Hitler and the Nazi Party, asserted Borges was secretly Jewish, and by implication, not truly Argentine. Borges responded by writing the essay, the title of which is a reference to the old phrase "Yo, Argentino" ("Me, I'm Argentine") that was uttered by potential victims during pogroms against Argentine Jews, to signify one was not Jewish. In the essay, Borges declares he would be proud to be a Jew, and remarks that any pure Castilian is likely to come from ancient Jewish descent, from a millennium ago.

In the essay, Borges details his own efforts, strenuous but ultimately futile, to document possible Jewish ancestors in his own family's genealogy:

Two-hundred years and I can’t find the Israelite; 200 years and my ancestor still eludes me. I am grateful for the stimulus provided by Crisol, but hope is dimming that I will ever be able to discover my link to the Table of the Breads and the Sea of Bronze; to Heine, Gleizer, and the ten Sefirot; to Ecclesiastes and Chaplin.

Charlie Chaplin was not Jewish, despite being named as Jewish in the essay. Sarah Rinder, writing to Mosaic Magazine, suggests that Borges expresses a "liking especially for those Jews who have transcended, or even shed, their Jewish identities."

The editor mentioned in the essay, Manuel Gleizer, was a librarian, publisher and editor whose bookshop was a meeting point for authors, including Borges.

In 2024, the University of Pennsylvania Libraries Kislak Center for Special Collections, Rare Books and Manuscripts purchased the holograph manuscript of Yo, Judío from a bookstore in Montevideo, Uruguay, shelfmark UPenn Misc Mss Box 25 Folder 38 .

== See also ==
- Antisemitism in Argentina
- Conversos
- Marrano
- History of the Jews in Argentina
