= Moments (poem) =

Poem in Spanish of unknown origin

Moments (Spanish: Instantes) is the title of a text wrongly attributed to Argentine writer Jorge Luis Borges. It was widely spread through articles, compilations, posters and email chain letters, mainly in Spanish.

Spanish versions, with some variations, consist of a first person narrated poem about an 85-year-old person who regrets not having enjoyed some simple pleasures during his life and instead having focused on safety and correctness.

The vocabulary, syntax and style do not match those of Borges.

== Original text and author ==
The first known version of the text was authored by American humorist and cartoonist Don Herold, and published by College Humor before 1935, or perhaps early that year, under the title "I'd Pick More Daisies". Herold's text is in prose, and it lacks the melancholic tone of the Spanish poem. E.g.:

If I had my life to live over, I'd try to make more mistakes next time. I would relax. I would limber up. I would be sillier than I have been this trip. I know of very few things that I would take seriously. I would be crazier. I would be less hygienic. I would take more chances. I would take more trips. I would climb more mountains and swim more rivers. I would burn up more gasoline. I would eat more ice cream and less bran.

Herold published a revised version in the October 1953 number of Reader's Digest.

== English and Spanish apocryphal versions ==
Another English version, attributed to one Nadine Stair or Nadine Strain, starts:

If I Had My Life to Live Over I'd dare to make more mistakes next time. I'd relax, I would limber up. I would be sillier than I have been this trip. I would take fewer things seriously. I would take more chances. I would climb more mountains and swim more rivers. I would eat more ice cream and less beans.

This version, supposedly written by Nadine Stair, is the most common version in North America. However it is doubtful that Nadine Stair ever existed. Just how Nadine Stair came to attributed as the author is unknown. Nonetheless, what is known, is that Sandra Martz produced an anthology of poems dealing with women and aging. In this anthology she attributes Don Herold's poem, with some modifications, to a certain Nadine Stair. This was likely done because the anthology was sold as being written by women, for women—and consequently, a poem written by a man would not have appealed to female readers.

One of the most spread Spanish versions wrongly attributed to Borges starts with the following verses:

Spanish apocryphal text	English translation
Si pudiera vivir nuevamente mi vida En la próxima trataría de cometer más errores No intentaría ser tan perfecto, me relajaría más Sería más tonto de lo que he sido, de hecho tomaría muy pocas cosas con seriedad Sería menos higiénico	If I could live my life again Next time I would try to make more mistakes I would not try to be so perfect, I would relax more I would be sillier than I was, in fact I would take very few things seriously I would be less hygienic

== Most important wrong attributions ==
Spanish versions with the shape of a poem were wrongly attributed to Borges by literary magazines like Mexican Plural (May 1989, pages 4–5) and books (such as Elena Poniatowska's "Todo México", page 144).

In December 2005, Irish pop singer Bono, read in Spanish some of the lines of the poem on Mexican TV show Teletón México 2005 and attributed them to the "Chilean poet Borges."

The attribution error was so extended that even the poet and scholar Alastair Reid translated one of the Spanish versions into English under the belief that it was a work from Borges. Reid's translations starts,

If I were able to live my life again,
next time I would try to make more mistakes.
I would not try to be so perfect. I would be more relaxed.
I would be much more foolish than I have been. In fact,
I would take very few things seriously.
I would be much less sanitary.
