= María Rosa Oliver =

Argentine writer (1898–1977)

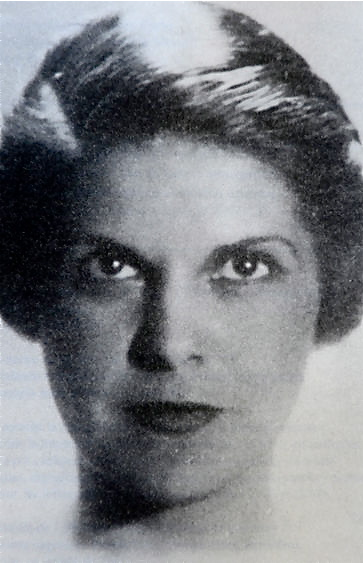
- Born: 10 September 1898; Buenos Aires
- Died: 19 April 1977 (aged 78)
- Known for: winning the Lenin Peace Prize

María Rosa Oliver or María Rosa Oliver Romero (10 September 1898 – 19 April 1977) was an Argentine short story writer, essayist, critic, translator and activist. She won the Lenin Peace Prize in 1957.

== Life ==
Oliver was born in Buenos Aires in 1898. She was the eldest of eight children from an influential family. She was descended from María de los Remedios de Escalada and she was the great grand daughter of José de San Martín who had led the fight for independence from Spain.

Oliver was vice-president of the Union of Argentine Women and a co-founder of Junta de la Victoria. She wrote in opposition to fascism and a defender of the Argentine state. Starting in 1942 she was one of the founding members of the Argentine magazine Sur with Victoria Ocampo.

She was employed in 1944 by Nelson Rockefeller who was then Secretary of State. Her mission was to improve relations between the United States and Argentina. Oliver reported to Rockefeller that America had the same problem with its public relations as Argentina had with its public relations within South America. She thought that Argentina was not well regarded because of its power - for instance it dominated the South American printing industry. She felt that the United States dealt with the world in a superior way. Rockefeller resigned in 1944 but still continued to work on relations with Argentina.

She was still working with Rockefeller in 1945 and this was the same year as she ceased her involvement with Sur magazine.

In 1957 Oliver was awarded the International Lenin Prize for Strengthening Peace Among Nations after serving on the World Peace Council starting in 1953.
