= La Verde =

Coordinates: 27°07′34″S 59°22′32″W

La Verde (Chaco)
- Municipality and village
- Interactive map of La Verde (Chaco)
- Country: Argentina
- Province: Chaco Province
- Time zone: UTC−3 (ART)

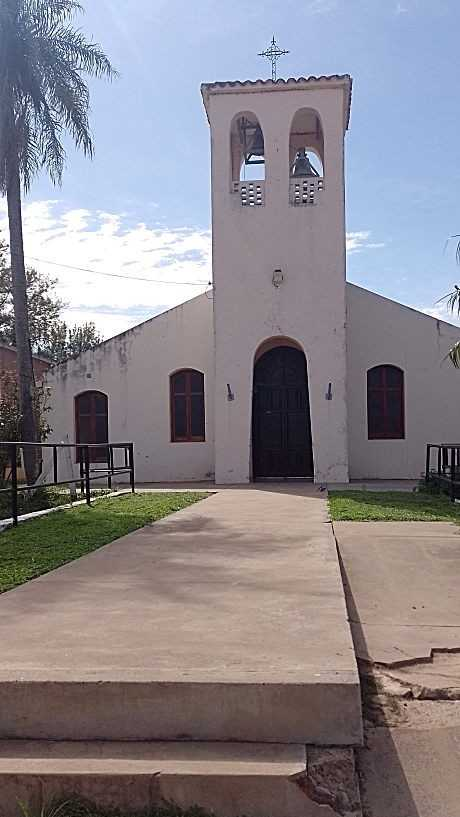
Main Chapel of La Verde

La Verde (Chaco) is a village and municipality in Chaco Province in northern Argentina.
