= Jorge Guillermo Borges =

Argentine writer, philosopher, lawyer (1874–1938)

Jorge Guillermo Borges Haslam (24 February 1874 – 14 February 1938) was an Argentine lawyer, teacher, writer, philosopher and translator. He was also an anarchist and a follower of Herbert Spencer's philosophy of philosophical anarchism. He was Jorge Luis Borges's father.

== Background ==
In 1898, he married Leonor Acevedo Suárez with whom he had two children: writer Jorge Luis Borges and painter Norah Borges. Due to the failing eyesight that would eventually afflict his son, Borges eventually abandoned his law career and the family moved to Geneva, Switzerland before World War I, where the young Jorge Luis was treated by an eye specialist. In 1921, the Borges family returned to Argentina.

Jorge Guillermo Borges studied law but only worked as a judicial clerk for a few years before having to resign due to his failing eyesight. He later worked as a professor at the Escuela Normal de Lenguas Vivas (Normal School of Modern Languages) in Buenos Aires, where he taught a course on psychology in English, using William James's Psychology: A Briefer Course as the course textbook. He was a friend of Macedonio Fernández, who became friends with Borges's son. He planned a commune for individualist anarchists in Paraguay. Borges wrote a novel, El Caudillo, published in 1921.

Borges had maternal ancestral roots in Staffordshire, England. A cultivated man, he read fluently in English, was an agnostic, a skeptic, and had a deep interest in metaphysics. At the homes where he settled with his wife and family both in Palermo and Geneva, he kept a large library offering his children a complex and profound universe. On those bookshelves, young Jorge Luis and Norah could find important works in English literature: Robert Louis Stevenson, Nathaniel Hawthorne, H. G. Wells, Samuel Taylor Coleridge, Rudyard Kipling, Thomas De Quincey, Edgar Allan Poe, and Herman Melville. His son would later remark that "if I were asked to name the chief event in my life, I should say my father's library."
