= Junta de la Victoria =

Argentine feminist movement

Junta de la Victoria was an Argentine social movement that mobilized women against fascism, supporting democracy domestically and abroad. Founded on September 13, 1941 by upper-class women, Communists, rural Jewish women, and wives of foreign diplomats, Junta had 45,000 members in 125 different chapters around the country. Junta collected supplies, made goods, and donated money to the Allied war effort. The founders saw rising nationalism and fascism in Argentina as inherently based on Europe, saying that, "Allied and Argentine struggles for liberty and democracy were intertwined".

Outside of its commitment to anti-fascism, Junta de la Victoria advocated for women's rights. The organization's leaders saw freedom and democracy as linked to women's ability to learn and thrive, and saw their conventions as a chance to usher in democracy through diversity, mutual respect, and cooperation. Ultimately, though, egalitarian labor and social reform became secondary to fighting fascism.

Junta de la Victoria's operations were limited and eventually shut down during the dictatorship of Pedro Pablo Ramírez, who saw the group's pro-Allied stance as Communist-aligned. Nevertheless, Junta continued to make an impact throughout the war and remains an important model for women's movements in Argentina and Latin America to this day.

== Movement leaders ==
=== Cora Ratto de Sadosky ===
Cora Ratto de Sadosky (1912–1981) founded Junta de la Victoria, and later became the organization's secretary and a key organizer. Most popularly known as a scholar, educator, and mathematician, Ratto de Sadosky's work as a Communist (she was affiliated with the Communist Party of Argentina) and anti-fascist occupied much of her time during the Second World War. She argued that Junta was not just maternalist philanthropy, but "an organization of work and struggle".

=== Maria Rosa Oliver ===
Maria Rosa Oliver (1898–1977) founded Junta de la Victoria along with Cora Ratto de Sadosky, and became the vice president. An "upper-class Communist intellectual", Oliver was also an active member in Agrupacion Femenina Antiguerra (AFA) and the vice president of the Unión Argentina de Mujeres (UAM) from 1936 to 1943.

=== Ana Rosa Schlieper de Martinez Guerrero ===
Ana Rosa Schlieper de Martinez Guerrero (1898–1964) was an upper-class philanthropist and radical who advocated for the welfare of women and children. She became the president of Junta de la Victoria and was in charge of the group's national mobilization. At the same time, Guerrero was the president of the Inter-American Commission of Women and the UAM, and the secretary general of Acción Antifascista Argentina. As part of her welfare work, she attempted to bring Jewish refugee children to Argentina during World War II, but ultimately failed.

=== Fanny Edelman ===
Fanny Edelman (1911–2011) was born in Argentina as the daughter of poor Jewish immigrants from the Russian Empire. She grew up in a secular socialist household and joined the Communist Party in 1934. She was involved in the Liga Argentina por los Derechos del Hombre, when she was jailed for her involvement in the cause of freeing political prisoners. Edelman became involved in fighting fascism and authoritarianism– in conjunction with her anti-capitalist work– during the Spanish Civil War, where she served as an officer for the Communist-aligned Comité Argentino de Mujeres Pro Huérfanos Españoles (CAMHE) in Argentina and worked for Socorro Roco (International Red Aid) in Spain. This inspired her to organize against fascism during the Second World War, where she joined and "worked without pause, without rest, in the Junta de la Victoria". After the war, she founded the Union de Mujeres de la Argentina (UMA), became the general secretary of the Women's International Democratic Foundation, and ultimately was an honorary head of the Communist Party of Argentina.

=== Berta Singerman ===
Berta Singerman (1901–1998) emigrated to Argentina from Minsk, Belarus as a child. She began her artistic career in Yiddish theater in Buenos Aires, and continued to perform as an actress and singer in both Spanish and Yiddish throughout her childhood. Singerman was a prominent and frequent performer at Junta benefit concerts and events, and is best known for her performance of "Marseille" at Plaza Francia after France was liberated.

== Transnational influences ==
Junta de la Victoria was an organization based in transnational struggle, committed to fighting fascism both at home and abroad. Not only did they send supplies and money to the Allies during World War II, but they also sent letters of support to women in Allied countries. In fact, at the group's First National Convention in Buenos Aires in 1942, they sent telegrams from all 15,000 attendees to the Soviet Union, United States, Great Britain, and China, reminding them they were not alone in the defense and struggle for liberty.

Furthermore, the women of Junta de la Victoria were deeply inspired by the ideologies and organizing of anti-fascist women in other continents and nations. Many of the organization's leaders– including Fanny Edelman– were involved in the Spanish Revolution of 1936, where radical women participated by making uniforms and fighting on the front lines.

But, Junta de la Victoria's most prominent transnational connection was with anti-fascist activists in Uruguay, following a long history of transnational exchanges between the two countries. This connection began in December 1941 with Accion Antinazi, an anti-fascist group led predominantly by Communist men, and its women's branch Comisión de Damas. Junta's First National Convention featured a delegation from Uruguay: "the president and secretary of Accion Antinazi de Montevideo, Drs. Gilseno Aguirre and Juan L. Massera, and the vice president and secretary of Comite Feminina de Uruguay [referring to the Comisión], Ms. Silva Mainero and Coca Campisreus". Additionally, the Comisión co-sponsored a visit from Rosa Scheiner, a socialist speaker and member of Junta de la Victoria, to trade ideas on women's aid activities.

The Comisión ultimately transformed itself into Acción Femenina por la Victoria, a broader Popular Front group that had members beyond the Communist Party. The group's founder, Elia Rodriguez Belo de Artucio, credits Junta de la Victoria with providing the basis for their organization, specifically in its emphasis on diversity of membership.

== Major activities and accomplishments ==
Junta la Victoria's first campaign, which began in 1941, involved knitting 20,000 garments for British and Russian soldiers. From there, the organization continued to collect, make, and send supplies to the Allies, as well as raise money for the Allied war effort. It collected foodstuff, hospital supplies, used apparel, and goods for recycling, which were for making weapons or other wartime uses. In workshops around the country, women made clothing, bedding, bandages, and first-aid kits by collecting thread and fabric, and through donations of sheep's wool from women from farm-owning families. By September 1942, Junta had distributed 465,036 pesos worth of goods to the Allies.

Additionally, the organization raised money by selling magazines, flowers, badges, and tickets to their events. Chapters put on exhibitions of anti-fascist artists, teas to honor Allied female dignitaries and their own dedicated members, and large benefit concerts. Junta donated almost 95,000 pesos to Allied war efforts and support organizations by February 1942.

Another important aspect of Junta's work was their conventions. Their first national convention took place in April 1942, followed by a provincial convention in October 1942, and another national convention in May 1943. At the conventions, women would discuss the accomplishments of the national Junta and its local chapters, and discuss what would come next for the organization. Crucially, it allowed a diverse group of women to participate democratically, giving them the skills to be full contributing members of a civic democracy.

== End of organization ==
Junta de la Victoria was founded during the presidency of Roberto Ortiz, a member of the social-liberal political party the Radical Civic Union, who ultimately resigned and delegated his powers to his vice president, Ramón Castillo. During his presidency, Castillo limited freedom of assembly and police restricted Junta's meetings, public rallies, and events. They broke up the organization's Victory Review at the Gran Rex Theater in December 1942.

After a military coup, Pedro Pablo Ramirez– the founder and leader of Argentina's fascist militia– seized power. The new administration was heavily influenced by the growing Nacionalista movement, which was staunchly opposed to Communism and Jewish presence in Argentina. Immediately, Ramirez began to crack down on "Jewish and non-Jewish leftists, independent trade unionists, and democrats". In 1943, he began closing the downtown office of Junta, and its members who resisted were sent to the Special Section. Then, in January 1944, a Ramirez decree officially shut down Junta and other pro-Allied organizations, claiming they were Communist.

While this decree forced Junta underground, it didn't stop its operations entirely. The organization continued to function under the alias Colemna, and sent remitted funds hidden from the police to Acción Femenina por la Victoria in Uruguay. They raised more than $17,000 in Uruguayan pesos, which the group used to make 25,586 bandages and donated winter garments. Additionally, after France was liberated by the Allies in August 1944, Junta gathered nearly 200,000 members and supporters in Plaza Francia in Buenos Aires to celebrate. As Berta Singerman performed "Marseille" and "La Cucaracha" (replacing the word ‘cockroach' with ‘Nazi'), police tear gassed the crowd and forced them to disperse.

In campaigning for the upcoming elections in 1946, Junta was allowed to reopen limited operations in April 1945. After World War II was over, Junta faced a new set of challenges. The need to raise money for the Allies was far less compelling and Juan Perón soon became the nation's president. The organization shifted its energy to advocating for "social welfare and women's issues", fighting "Nazi-Peronism", and fundraising against the dictatorship of Francisco Franco in Spain. Ultimately, though, Junta didn't last much longer. The Communist Party withdrew their support from Junta's mission, devoting their attention entirely back to class struggle and discouraging Junta's connections to "British and U.S. imperialism". Junta de la Victoria became absorbed into the newly established Unión de Mujeres de la Argentina (UMA) in 1947.

== Legacy ==
As the largest women's mobilization in Argentina prior to Peronism, Junta de la Victoria's actions and ideologies have remained influential in the country's and region's women-led movements. Its leaders have gone on to have a prominent impact on national and international politics. Unión de Mujeres de la Argentina (UMA) has existed for more than 70 years, and maintains Junta's commitment to diversity of class, ethnicity, religion, and political ideology.

== See also ==
- Feminism in Argentina
