= Ana Rosa Schlieper de Martínez Guerrero =

Argentine activist

Ana Rosa Schlieper de Martínez Guerrero (15 August 1898 - 4 September 1964) was an Argentine feminist leader, philanthropist, and welfare worker. She founded the Señoras de San Vicente de Paul en General Madariaga (Ladies Conference of St. Vincent de Paul in General Madariaga), as well as a 100-bed hospital and nursing school for women. She also founded the Unión Argentina de Mujeres (Argentine Women's Union) and a war relief organization, Victory Committee.

== Biography ==
Martínez Guerrero was born in 1898 in Buenos Aires, the daughter of Enrique Schlieper and Ana Zabalrado. She studied at the Colegio de Sagrado Corazon (1910–15).

Martínez Guerrero was committed to advancing the social position of women through her work with social service agencies. She came to the US by invitation of the National Women Voters. During the period of 1938-43, she chaired the Liga de Protección a la Joven (League for the Protection of the Young). Martínez Guerrero founded the Señoras de San Vicente de Paul en General Madariaga (Ladies Conference of St. Vincent de Paul in General Madariaga), as well as a 100-bed hospital and nursing school for women. She founded the Unión Argentina de Mujeres (Argentine Women's Union) in 1936, presiding from 1938 to 1940. Russell Sage College (New York City, 1941) awarded her the title of doctor honoris causa. The Junta de la Victoria was established in the same year, with Martinez Guerrero as its president. At the same time, she was the leader of the Inter-American Commission of Women (1939–43), and secretary general of the anti-Fasciest group, Accion Argentina (Argentine Action). She also founded a war relief organization, Victory Committee. She died in Buenos Aires on September 4, 1964.

== Bibliography ==
- Carlson, Marifran (1 August 2005). ¡Feminismo!: The Woman's Movement in Argentina. Academy Chicago Publishers. ISBN 978-0-89733-168-5.
- Hilton, Ronald (1971). Who's who in Latin America: a biographical dictionary of notable living men and women of Latin America. B. Ethridge. ISBN 9780879170219.
- Lesser, Jeff (2008). Rethinking Jewish-Latin Americans. UNM Press. ISBN 978-0-8263-4401-4.
