= Sonia Berjman =

Argentine historian

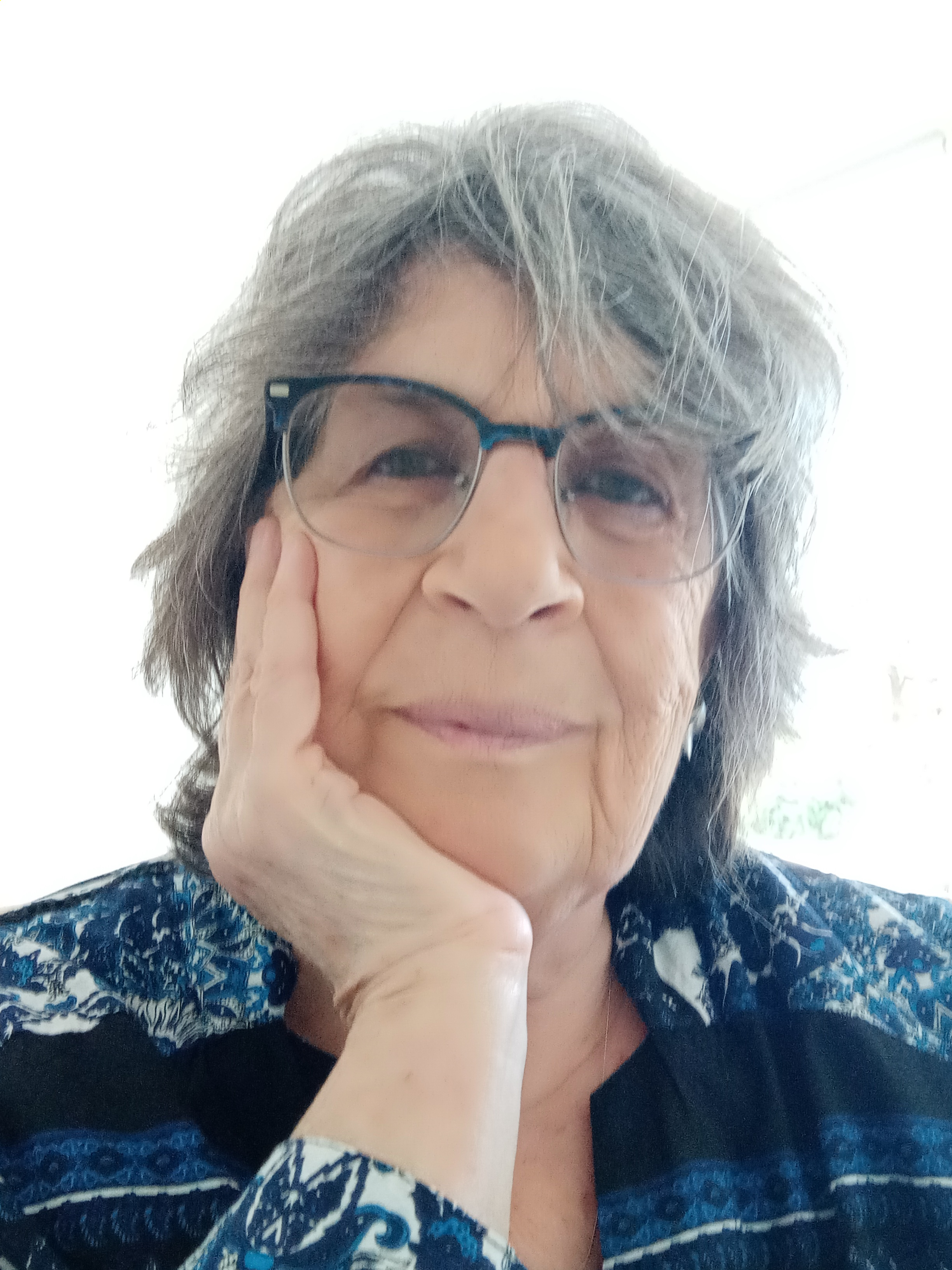
- Born: 1946 (age 79–80); Santa Fe, Argentina
- Occupations: Academic, writer
- Website: soniaberjman.com

Sonia Berjman (born 1946) is an urban and landscape historian, researcher on the history of Buenos Aires public space and protector of parks, squares, and public green spaces of that city, she is an acknowledged referent for these issues.

She published more than a hundred texts and articles (including more than 20 books) in both academic and popular media, installing the study of landscape history in her native country.

She holds two PhDs: one from the University of Buenos Aires (UBA), and another from Pantheon-Sorbonne University, and continued postdoctoral studies at the Dumbarton Oaks Research Library and Collection of Harvard University. She was a researcher at the National Scientific and Technical Research Council (CONICET) and at the Universidad de Buenos Aires, as well as professor at the national universities of Tucumán, Mar del Plata, and the Northeast. She is also a member of councils, commissions, and scientific committees in Argentina and abroad.

Berjman has written detailed bibliographies on the lives and work of landscaper Carlos Thays and his son Carlos León Thays. In 2014, her book Los Paseos Públicos de Buenos Aires y la labor de Carlos León Thays (h) entre 1922 y 1946 was declared of cultural interest of the Autonomous City of Buenos Aires (Declaration 98/2014). In 2009, she curated the exhibition Carlos Thays, un jardinero francés en Buenos Aires at the Centro Cultural Recoleta organized by the Buenos Aires City government, the Mairie de Paris and the French Embassy in Argentina, this exhibition was visited by 50,000 persons in one month.

Landscape is a mental construction, made possible by man's outlook towards a piece of territory. In the end, it is the reflection of our ideological views, exterior and interior, pragmatic and artistic, representations as physical objects, states of the soul as vital needs. Landscape is equal to world.

— Sonia Berjman, 2012

== Biography ==
Sonia Berjman was born in 1946 in the city of Santa Fe, Argentina. The littoral landscape of her birthplace was a great influence in her life.

She graduated in History of Arts at the University of Buenos Aires and earned a PhD in Philosophy and Letters at the same university, summa cum laude. She is also a Docteur ès Histoire de l'Art at Université Paris I, Pantheon-Sorbonne University, (Mention Très Honorable) and was a postdoctoral fellow at Harvard University's Dumbarton Oaks Research Library and Collection.

She is an Honorary Member of the International Scientific Committee "Cultural Landscapes" and a member of the International Council on Monuments and Sites. She is on the editorial boards of Paisagem e Ambiente (University of São Paulo), Revista de Arquitectura (Catholic University of Colombia), Leituras Paisagísticas: teoria e práxis (School of Fine Arts of the Federal University of Rio de Janeiro), and the Revista del Centro de Estudios de Historia de la Arquitectura y el Urbanismo (CEHAU, Universidad Nacional del Nordeste, Argentina).[6].

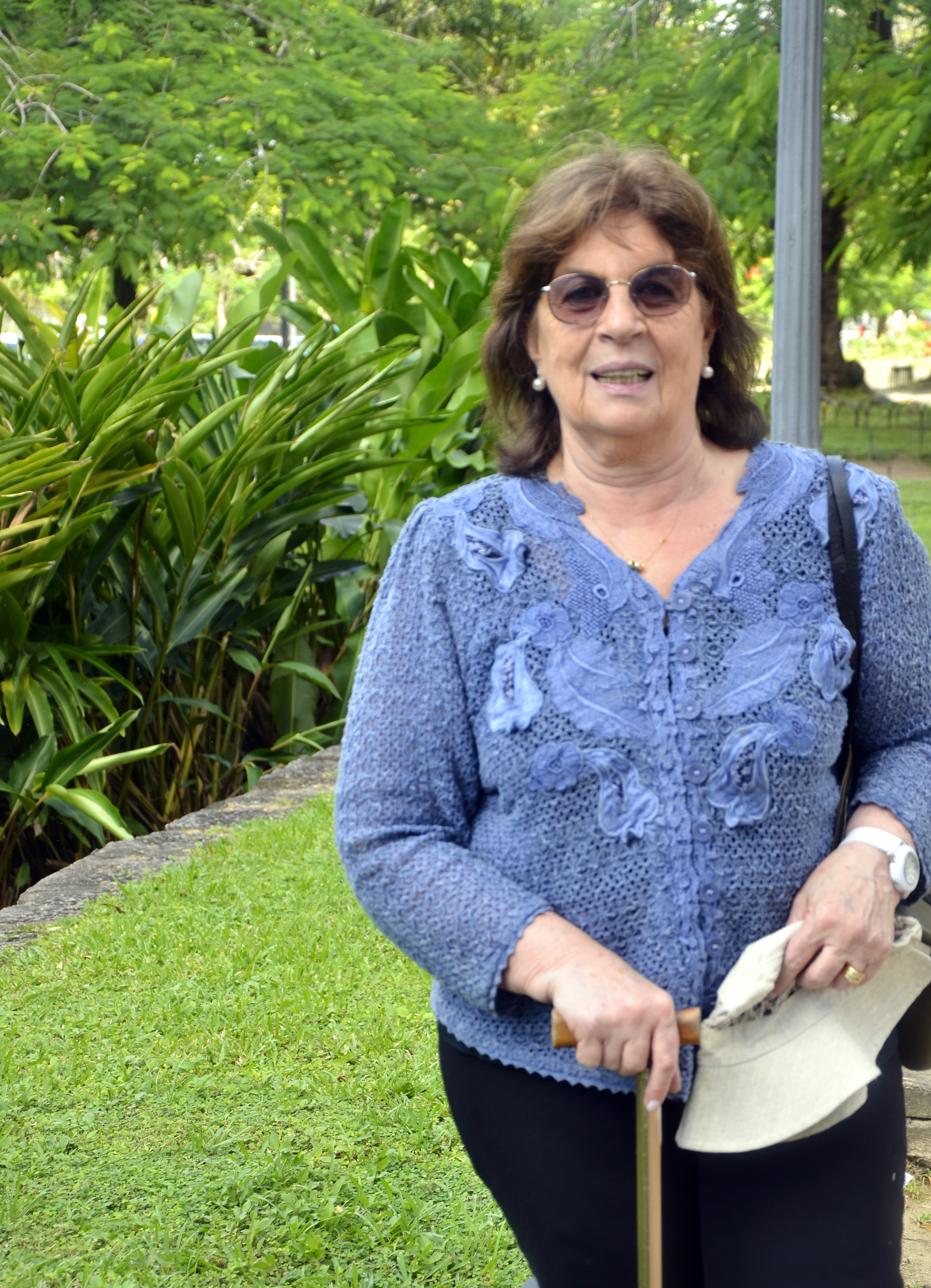
Sonia Berjman, protector of green spaces of the city of Buenos Aires

She is also member of @la_tribu-verde, a group of landscapers whose aim is to spread and develop landscape issues. This group has wide presence in Latin America and Europe, with more than 16.000 followers in Instagram and YouTube.

Berjman is a specialist in the life and work of landscaper Carlos Thays, as well as the descendants who continued his legacy, from his son Carlos León to Carlos Thays IV. In 2009 she curated the exhibition Carlos Thays, un jardinero francés en Buenos Aires at the Centro Cultural Recoleta, organized jointly by the Buenos Aires Government, the Embassy of France in Argentina, and the City of Paris. With a didactic-aesthetic sense, the show focused on the need to value and care for the country's urban and natural green spaces.

She is also a contributor to Historic Gardens Review (London) and member of the Association Edouard André (France).

From 2015 to 2020, she was a Reader at Dumbarton Oaks Research Library and Collection.

Throughout her professional career Berjman has also been:

- CONICET career researcher based at the Instituto Histórico de la Ciudad de Buenos Aires.
- Researcher at the University of Buenos Aires: 1) Faculty of Philosophy and Literature; 2) Faculty of Architecture, Design, and Urbanism at the Instituto de Arte Americano (to which she was also the Academic Secretary), and 3) Faculty of Agronomic Sciences
- Postgraduate Professor of the National Universities of Tucumán and Mar del Plata, Director of the master's degree in Environmental, Landscape and Heritage Management at the Universidad Nacional del Nordeste.
- Senior Fellow and member of the Board on Landscape Studies of the Dumbarton Oaks Library (Harvard University, United States)
- Investigations carried out for: Argentine National Bank, Bank of the province of Buenos Aires, Argentine Credit Bank, Quilmes Brewery, Federal Investment Council, National Parks Administration, Ministry of Public Works of Spain, Generalitat de Valencia, Junta de Andalucía, University of Genoa, Ministère de la Recherche de France, and others
- Lecturer and/or guest professor in Argentina, Brazil, Chile, Mexico, Colombia, Uruguay, France, Spain, United States, Belgium, Italy, and Costa Rica
- Founder and Honorary Director of the Villa Ocampo/UNESCO Landscape Center
- Member of ICOMOS Argentina and Uruguay.

== Buenos Aires Underground dispute ==
In 2012, Sonia Berjman presented, together with the association Basta de Demoler, an amparo action aimed at stopping work related to the construction of the Plaza Francia station of the extension of Line H of the Buenos Aires underground. This presentation was due to the fact that, in February of that year, excavation work had begun in the Plaza Intendente Alvear, which had been designed by the landscaper Carlos Thays in 1897, destroying the original design, the old trees, and its historic ravine. By law the aforementioned station should instead have been located near the UBA's Faculty of Law, being that the Plaza Intendente Alvear is part of Historic Protection Area No. 14, and for that reason the extraction of vegetal species, as well as the modification of its design, roads, and paths are prohibited. The presentation sought to protect the environment and the cultural and historical heritage of the city, and also highlighted the failure to adequately assess the project's environmental impact.

In 2013, the Buenos Aires Underground company (SBASE) acknowledged the error and reconstructed the Plaza Intendente Alvear.

As a result of these actions, the City Legislature modified the route of the H line, taking it to the Retiro neighborhood, providing Villa 31 with its own station, and building the disputed station at the site designated by Dr. Berjman, i.e. together with the Faculty of Law.

Subsequently, the Government of the City of Buenos Aires and SBASE sued Sonia Berjman, the NGO Basta de Demoler, and its president for the sum of 24 million pesos, for the damages and losses allegedly caused when filing an action for collective protection. It was alleged that the action was initiated "for the sole purpose of obliterating a public work destined to the provision of a public service" and that "there are political motives to hinder the management of government and the works within the Plaza Alvear." In 2016, on the occasion of a fundraiser at the Universidad del Salvador, a group of notable citizens in the field of landscaping such as Adrián Camps, Roxana Di Bello, Marcelo Magadán, and Carlos Thays (great-great-great-grandson of the famous landscaper) took the opportunity to show their support.

Due to this persecution, Dr. Berjman exiled herself in Uruguay, where she continues to research, write, publish and counsel on her specialty to different universities, colleagues, media, around the world.

== Selected publications ==
- 1890-1990: Centenario de la Cervecería Quilmes
- La Arquitectura en los Parques nacionales
- El Abasto, un barrio y un mercado
- Reflexiones sobre Joseph Bouvard y el paisaje de Rosario en 1910
- Benito Javier Carrasco: Sus textos
- Banco de la Nación Argentina: Acción, presencia y testimonio en la construcción del país
- Carlos Thays. Un jardinero francés en Buenos Aires
- La Victoria de los Jardines. El paisaje en Victoria Ocampo
- Carlos Thays: sus escritos sobre jardines y paisajes
- Plaza San Martín: Imágenes de una historia
- La Plaza de Mayo, escenario de la vida argentina
- La Plaza Española en Buenos Aires 1580-1880
- El tiempo de los Parques
- Plazas y Parques de Buenos Aires: La obra de los paisajistas franceses en Buenos Aires 1860-1930
- El Parque 3 de Febrero de Buenos Aires
- El Patio-Glorieta andaluz de Buenos Aires
- El Rosedal de Buenos Aires. 1914-2009 / 95° Aniversario, with Roxana Di Bello
- Los Paseos Públicos de Buenos Aires y la labor de Carlos León Thays (h) entre 1922 y 1946 – declared of cultural interest by the Legislature of the City of Buenos Aires in the session of 24 April 2014 (Declaration 98/2014)
- Los jardines de la Recoleta y la defensa del paisaje público como bien colectivo

== Awards and distinctions ==
- A group of legislators presented to the Buenos Aires City Legislature the proposal to declare Dr. Berjman as an "Outstanding Personality of the Autonomous City of Buenos Aires in the Field of Culture" but City Government Party legislators opposed to this award (2606–D– 2014)[
- Senior Fellow - Dumbarton Oaks Research Library and Collection, Trustees for Harvard University, Washington D.C., 2002–2006
- Buenos Aires Historian from the Legislature of the City of Buenos Aires, 1999.
- Literary Award from the World Federation of Rose Societies for her book El Rosedal de Buenos Aires. 1914-2009 / 95° Aniversario, 2012.
- Benito Carrasco Award from the Argentine Center of Landscape Architects (CAAP; Argentine section of the International Federation of Landscape Architects)
- Universidad del Salvador Tribute Citation in the Field of History and Management of the Arts, September 2016.
