= José Bianco =

Argentine essayist, translator, and writer

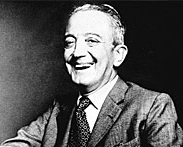
Bianco in 1978

José Bianco (1908–1986) was an Argentine essayist, translator, and writer. He worked in the genres of the novel, short story and essay. He also ventured into journalism. Jorge Luis Borges counted among his admirers.

Bianco made translations of works by Henry James, Jean-Paul Sartre, François Mauriac, Julien Benda, and Ambrose Bierce, among others.

Bianco began his career with El Límite in 1929, and later he published Little Gyaros in 1932 for which he won the Jockey Club (Buenos Aires) Award

Bianco served as a secretary of Sur (magazine) for 23 years. From 1961 to 1967, he worked with Editorial Universitaria de Buenos Aires in Buenos Aires.

== Biography ==
=== Beginnings ===
He began his literary career in March 1929 with the publication of the short story El límite in La Nación, where he already displayed his refined and elegant style. He later published La pequeña Gyaros in 1932, with which he obtained the Biblioteca Prize of the Jockey Club. In 1941, one of his masterpieces appeared, Sombras suele vestir. Originally written for the anthology of fantastic literature compiled by Jorge Luis Borges, Silvina Ocampo and Adolfo Bioy Casares, Bianco delayed its completion and the anthology was published without his story in 1940 (it only appeared in that book in 1967, in a new edition). In 1943, another of his major works, Las ratas, was published. Close to communism in the 1950s and later to revolutionary Peronism in the 1960s, he was arrested in 1958 by the dictatorship of Pedro Eugenio Aramburu and released after an intense campaign by other writers.

=== Period at Sur magazine ===
Some of his works were prefaced by Jorge Luis Borges, with whom he was friends. He was part of the circle of the magazine Sur, founded and directed by Victoria Ocampo, and later joined its board as editorial secretary between 1938 and 1961, when Ocampo decided to dismiss him following his visit to Cuba, where the revolution had triumphed, and his participation as a juror in the Casa de las Américas Prize. It was in Sur that Sombras suele vestir was first published, in issue 85 of October 1941. Las ratas was also published in Sur. José Bianco was a close friend of the Cuban writer Virgilio Piñera and of Juan José Hernández, whose heirs donated to the National Library the writings and memorabilia of thirty years of friendship.

=== Maturity ===
In 1961, he began working at EUDEBA, the University of Buenos Aires publishing house, which he left in 1967 due to the intervention of the dictatorship of Juan Carlos Onganía, who had come to power in 1966.
