= Inés Arteta =

Argentine writer

Inés Arteta is an Argentine award-winning writer.

She is a graduate from the University of Buenos Aires with an advanced degree in History. She works as a professor at Universidad del Salvador and leads Literature seminars.

== Career ==
She taught English as a Second Language at the Instituto Cultural Argentino-North Americano (ICANA) where she soon became the Director of the Youth Department. In 1996 she graduated from the Faculty of Philosophy and Letters of the Universidad de Buenos Aires with an advanced degree in History and in 1997 she completed her masters level degree with a thesis comparing the Argentine and American Independence Processes. After graduation, she taught History, Civic Ethics and History at Saint Andrew`s College in Buenos Aires.

She has also directed workshops at EMA (Multiple Sclerosis Organization in Buenos Aires), the Unit 24 of the Penitentiary Service in Florencio Varela and in several other institutions. She wrote non-fiction for the magazine Babia of Lomas de Zamora and for the magazine Bamboo. In addition, she has written as a ghost writer for several clients.

She is currently a professor at the University of El Salvador, leads Literature seminars and writes the column "Night Light", for the digital magazine “Pensamientos literarios” (Literary Thoughts), where she analyses fiction. She also writes reviews for “Otra Parte Semanal”.

== Writer ==
While researching for her undergraduate thesis, Arteta asked her mentor to read a piece of fiction she had written, an apocryphal letter of Artigas, a relevant leader of the Argentine independence process. To her surprise, her mentor took the letter for authentic and the incident encouraged her to continue writing fiction. She began writing short stories that she collected in an unpublished volume, titled The Robbery. Her work focuses on family and couple relationships, gender conflict and social injustice. It is influenced by the North American writers Eudora Welty, Carson McCullers, Flannery O'Connor and Lorrie Moore and the Argentines Silvina Ocampo, Sara Gallardo and Antonio Di Benedetto.

Leopoldo Brizuela writes about Arteta: "Like the stories of Chekhov, of Natalia Ginzburg, of Julio Ramón Ribeyro, Inés Arteta's writing remains in your memory for the unmistakable quality of her voice. For her melancholic and implacable tone, for the sincerity and precision of her critique. And above all, for the ear through which she filters her characters’ voices, r the scarcity of their words and also the fierceness that her silences reveal.

The world painted by Arteta is nothing more than the surface of an unknowable, and probably sinister, sea; her words, equally, manage to evoke what we cannot say, which, in its anomie, holds us at its mercy and terrifies us.“

== Published books ==
- 2007: El mismo río, Ediciones Del Dragón, Buenos Aires.
- 2008: Chicas Bien, a book of stories, Ediciones Del Dragón, translated into English and French (digital version available on Amazon Kindle).
- 2015: Juego de mujeres, Alción Editora.
- 2016: La 21/24, una crónica de la religiosidad popular frente al desamparo, Ediciones Continente.

=== Awards ===
- 2004:
  - Finalist in Ferney Voltarie, France, in the contest "Encounter of two worlds", for her story Night of Owls.
- 2005:
  - Spain, Alcantarilla; Finalist in the contest of humor stories Jara Carrillo for her story “The Distributor”.
  - Mexico: Finalist in the contest “To whom it may concern” literary Mexican magazine for her the story “Head of Tiger”.
  - Spain: First finalist in Sant Adrià de Besós, Spain, Contest of short stories for her story “Bed with no Sheets”.
- 2006:
  - France, again finalist in Meeting of two worlds for her story “The evil eye”
  - Argentina: 2nd prize Honorarte, Letras de oro for her story “The robbery”.
  - Spain, Finalist in the contest of short stories for women's Day, Navalmoral de la Mata, Spain, for her story “The basement”.
  - The novel The same river was longlisted in Herralde Prize.
  - Spain, first runner up again in the Short Story Competition of Sant Adrià de Besós, for her story “The 08”.
- 2007:
  - First prize for short story in Daimon Arte, Buenos Aires, (jury formed by Ariel Bermani, Laura Massolo and Leopoldo Brizuela), for her story “The woman of the bus”
  - First National Award Inarco for the novel The same river.
- 2008:
  - Finalist in Daimon Arte award, Buenos Aires, for her story “The woman of the Taxi”.
- 2009:
  - Spain, First International Sixth Continent Prize, for her story “The Woman of the Taxi”.
- 2014:
  - Finalist in BAN! Buenos Aires Negra 2014, for her novel, The Caimans.
- 2016:
  - First Prize in Literature, awarded by the Buenos Aires city Government (special E. Mallea for unpublished novels), biennium 2010/11 for her novel Las Pereira
  - Finalist in Crime novel contest Córdoba kills for her novel The Caimans.

== Seminars ==
- 2015: Presented a paper, Those who live on the edge of the Riachuelo at the Literature Congress at the University of Salvador.
- 2016: Presented a paper Women's Game at the Congress for Gender Studies at the University of Luján.

== Unpublished novels ==
- The Caimans
- The Pereiras
- The desire
