= Arteta =

Arteta is a Basque surname that may refer to:

- Ainhoa Arteta (born 1964), Spanish soprano singer
- Aurelio Arteta (1879–1940), Spanish painter
- Inés Arteta, Argentine writer
- Miguel Arteta (born 1965), American director of film and television
- Mikel Arteta (born 1982), Spanish football coach and former player
- Pedro José de Arteta (1797–1873), Vice President of Ecuador
- Unai Bilbao Arteta (born 1994), Spanish footballer
- Diego Noboa y Arteta (1789–1870), also known as Diego Noboa, President of Ecuador
