= Manuel Peyrou =

Argentine writer and journalist

Manuel Peyrou (May 23, 1902 – January 1, 1974) was an Argentine writer and journalist.

== Life and work ==
Peyrou was born in San Nicolás de los Arroyos in 1902. He enrolled at the University of Buenos Aires and obtained a Law Degree in 1925, but never practiced law, instead working for a time for an English Argentine railway company, and ultimately joining the editorial staff of La Prensa, then the country's second-most circulated daily. His short story, La noche incompleta (The Unfinished Night) was published by La Prensa in 1935, and Peyrou became an editor of the daily's respected literary supplement, eventually becoming the section's chief editor.

He contributed to literary critic Victoria Ocampo's Sur, and a close friend from his days at the university, Jorge Luis Borges, later brought him on as chief film critic for Los Anales de Buenos Aires, Borges' literary review. La espada dormida (The Sleeping Sword), Peyrou's 1944 pulp fiction work, was followed by a satire, El estruendo de las rosas, in 1948, which earned him a Municipal Literary Prize;

Peyrou's later works departed from the detective genre and were mainly realist narratives. A number, including Las leyes del juego (The Rules of the Game, 1959), El árbol de Judas (The Judas Tree, 1963), Marea de fervor (Tide of Fervor, 1967), and El hijo rechazado (The Rejected Son, 1969), were also acclaimed by critics. His short stories were published by Selecciónes (the Spanish-language edition of Reader's Digest) and by Greek publisher George Humuziadis, among others. His 1949 work, El estruendo de las rosas, was translated into English by Donald A. Yates and published by Herder Publishers in 1972 as Thunder of Roses: A Detective Novel.

Peyrou died in Buenos Aires in 1974.
