= Noemí Ulla =

Argentine writer

Noemi Ulla (1940–2016) was an Argentine writer and scholar. She was born in Santa Fe and studied in Rosario. There she became involved with a group of young writers that included Hugo Gola, Rubén Sevlever and Aldo Oliva among others. She would eventually marry Oliva. Her Rosario days were the subject of her first novel Los que esperan el alba (1967).

She moved to Buenos Aires in 1969, and completed her PhD at the University of Buenos Aires. She became a noted scholar and teacher. She specialized in the life and work of the writer Silvina Ocampo, who had also been her friend and confidante. She published works such as Invenciones a dos voces: ficción y poesía en Silvina Ocampo (1992) and Encuentros con Silvina Ocampo (2003). These books helped to elevate Ocampo's importance as a writer, at a time when she was still considered to be mainly the wife of Adolfo Bioy Casares and the friend of Jorge Luis Borges.

She taught both at home and abroad. The latter included stints in Toulouse, Caen, Avignon, Paris, Montevideo, and Miami. In 2010, she became a member of the Academia Argentina de Letras, occupying the Domingo Faustino Sarmiento chair. Its previous occupants included Matías G. Sánchez Sorondo, Jorge Max Rohde and Antonio Pagés Larraya. She was a popular figure in literary circles, and counted the poets Juan Fernando García, María del Carmen Colombo, Reina Roffé and Claudia Schvartz among her friends.

Her notable books include:

- Los que esperan el alba (novel, 1967)
- Urdimbre (novel, 1981)
- Ciudades (stories, 1983)
- El cerco del deseo (stories, 1994)
- El ramito y otros cuentos (stories, 2002)
- Una lección de amor y otros cuentos (stories, 2005)
- En el agua del río (stories, 2007)
- Nereidas al desnudo (stories, 2010)
- Obsesiones de estilo (essays, 2004)
- De las orillas del Plata (essays, 2005)
- Variaciones rioplatenses (essays, 2007)

She also wrote a book on tango titled Tango, rebelión y nostalgia (1967) which was translated.

She died in 2016.
