= Silvina Ocampo =

Argentine writer (1903–1993)

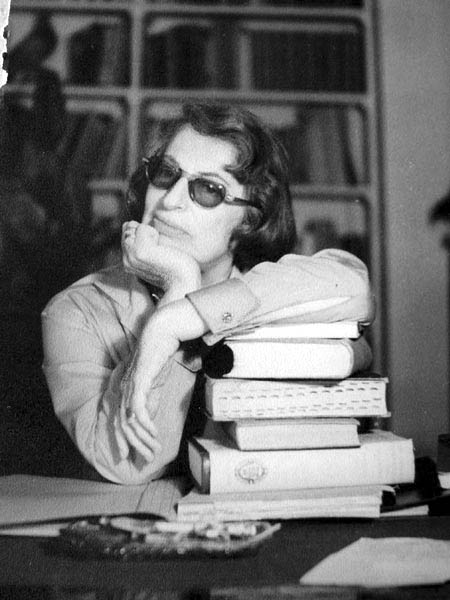
- Ocampo in 1959
- Born: 28 July 1903; Buenos Aires, Argentina
- Died: 14 December 1993 (aged 90); Buenos Aires, Argentina
- Resting place: La Recoleta Cemetery, Buenos Aires
- Occupations: Writer; poet
- Spouse: Adolfo Bioy Casares (m. 1940)
- Relatives: Victoria Ocampo (sister)

Silvina Ocampo (28 July 1903 – 14 December 1993) was an Argentine short story writer, poet, and artist. Ocampo's friend and collaborator Jorge Luis Borges called Ocampo "one of the greatest poets in the Spanish language, whether on this side of the ocean or on the other." Her first book was Viaje olvidado (1937), translated as Forgotten Journey (2019), and her final piece was Las repeticiones, published posthumously in 2006.

Before establishing herself as a writer, Ocampo was a visual artist. She studied painting and drawing in Paris where she met, in 1920, Fernand Léger and Giorgio de Chirico, forerunners of surrealism.

She received, among other awards, the Municipal Prize for Literature in 1954 and the National Poetry Prize in 1962.

== Personal life ==
Ocampo was born to a wealthy family in Buenos Aires, the youngest of six daughters (Victoria, Angélica, Francisca, Rosa, Clara María, and Silvina) of Manuel Silvio Cecilio Ocampo and Ramona Aguirre Herrera. Her family resided on the Canary Islands before moving to Argentina in the mid-19th century. Ocampo was the sister of Victoria Ocampo, the founder and editor of the prestigious Argentine journal Sur.

Ocampo was educated at home by tutors and in Paris. Her family belonged to the upper bourgeoisie, a fact that allowed her to have a very complete education. She had three governesses (one French and two English), a Spanish teacher, and an Italian teacher. Because of this, the six sisters learned to read in English and French before Spanish. This trilingual training would later influence Ocampo's writing, according to Ocampo herself.

Her ancestors belonged to the Argentine aristocracy and owned extensive lands. Her great-great-great-great-grandfather, José de Ocampo, was governor of Cuzco before moving to Virreinato del Río de la Plata. Manuel José de Ocampo (her great-great-great-grandfather) was one of the first governors when independence was declared. Her great-grandfather Manuel José de Ocampo y González was a politician and candidate for president of the country. He was also a friend of Domingo Faustino Sarmiento. Her grandfather, Manuel Anselmo Ocampo, was a rancher. Another of her ancestors was Domingo Martinez de Irala, conqueror of Asunción and future governor of Río de la Plata and Paraguay. The brother of Ocampo's great-great-great-grandmother, Juan Martín de Pueyrredón, was Supreme Director of the United Provinces of the Río de la Plata. Another distant relative is Juan Manuel de Rosas who was the main leader until 1852.

Her mother, Ramona Máxima Aguirre, was one of eight children. She enjoyed gardening and playing the violin. Her family was of Creole origins and religious. Her father, Manuel Silvio Cecilio Ocampo Regueira, was born in 1860 and was an architect. He was one of nine children and had a conservative character.

In winter, Ocampo visited her great-grandfather, who lived nearby, daily. During the summer, her family lived in a villa in San Isidro, a modern house that in its time had electricity and running water. Currently, this house (Villa Ocampo) is a UNESCO site and recognized as a historical monument. In the summer, she took classes on the second floor, where she learned the fundamentals that would later help her become a writer.

The critic Patricia Nisbet Klingenberg maintains, however, that as a child Ocampo "lived a lonely existence, relieved primarily by the companionship of various household workers [. . . ] This, then, is the place from which her works emerge, from memory and identification with those identified as other."

Two events that had a significant impact on Ocampo in her youth were the marriage of her sister Victoria and the death of her sister Clara. She stated that Victoria's marriage had taken away her youth: "Hubo un episodio de mi niñez que marcó mucho nuestra relación. Victoria me quitó la niñera que yo más quería, la que más me cuidó, la que más me mimó: Fanni. Ella me quería a mí más que a nadie. Fanni sabía que yo la adoraba, pero cuando Victoria se casó y se la llevó con ella nadie se atrevió a oponérsele" [There was an episode from my childhood that strongly marked our relationship. Victoria took away the nanny that I loved the most, the one who cared for me the most, the one who pampered me the most: Fanni. She loved me more than anyone else. Fanni knew I adored her, but when Victoria married and took her with her, no one dared to oppose her]. She also stated that she began to hate socializing once Clara died.

In 1908, Ocampo traveled to Europe for the first time with her family. Later she studied drawing in Paris with Giorgio de Chirico and Fernand Léger. Among her friends was the Italian writer Italo Calvino, who prefaced her stories. Back in Buenos Aires, she worked on painting with Norah Borges and María Rosa Oliver. She held various exhibitions, both individual and collective. When Victoria founded the magazine Sur in 1931, which published articles and texts by many important writers, philosophers, and intellectuals of the 20th century, Ocampo was part of the founding group. However, like Borges and Bioy Casares, she did not have a prominent role in the decisions about the content to be published, which was a task performed by Victoria and José Bianco.

In 1934, Ocampo met her future husband, the Argentine author Adolfo Bioy Casares. They married in 1940. The relationship between the two was complex, and Bioy openly had lovers. Some authors have described Ocampo as a victim, but others, such as Ernesto Montequin, have rejected this portrait: "Eso la pone en un lugar de minusválida. La relación con Bioy fue muy compleja; ella tuvo una vida amorosa bastante plena [. . .] La relación con Bioy podía hacerla sufrir, pero también la inspiraba" [That puts her in a handicapped place. The relationship with Bioy was very complex; she had a fairly full love life [. . . ] The relationship with Bioy Casares could make her suffer, but it also inspired her].

Ocampo and Bioy remained together until her death, despite her husband's frequent infidelities. In 1954, Bioy's extramarital daughter, Marta, was born. Ocampo adopted Marta and raised her as her own. Marta Bioy Ocampo died in an automobile accident shortly after Ocampo's own death. Bioy Casares's son by another mistress, Fabián Bioy, later won a lawsuit for the right to the estates of Ocampo and Bioy Casares; Fabián Bioy died in 2006.

== Career and literary works ==
Ocampo began her career as a short story writer in 1936. Ocampo published her first book of short stories, Viaje olvidado, in 1937, followed by three books of poetry: Enumeración de la patria, Espacios métricos, and Los sonetos del jardín. She was a prolific writer, producing more than 175 pieces of fiction during one forty-year period.

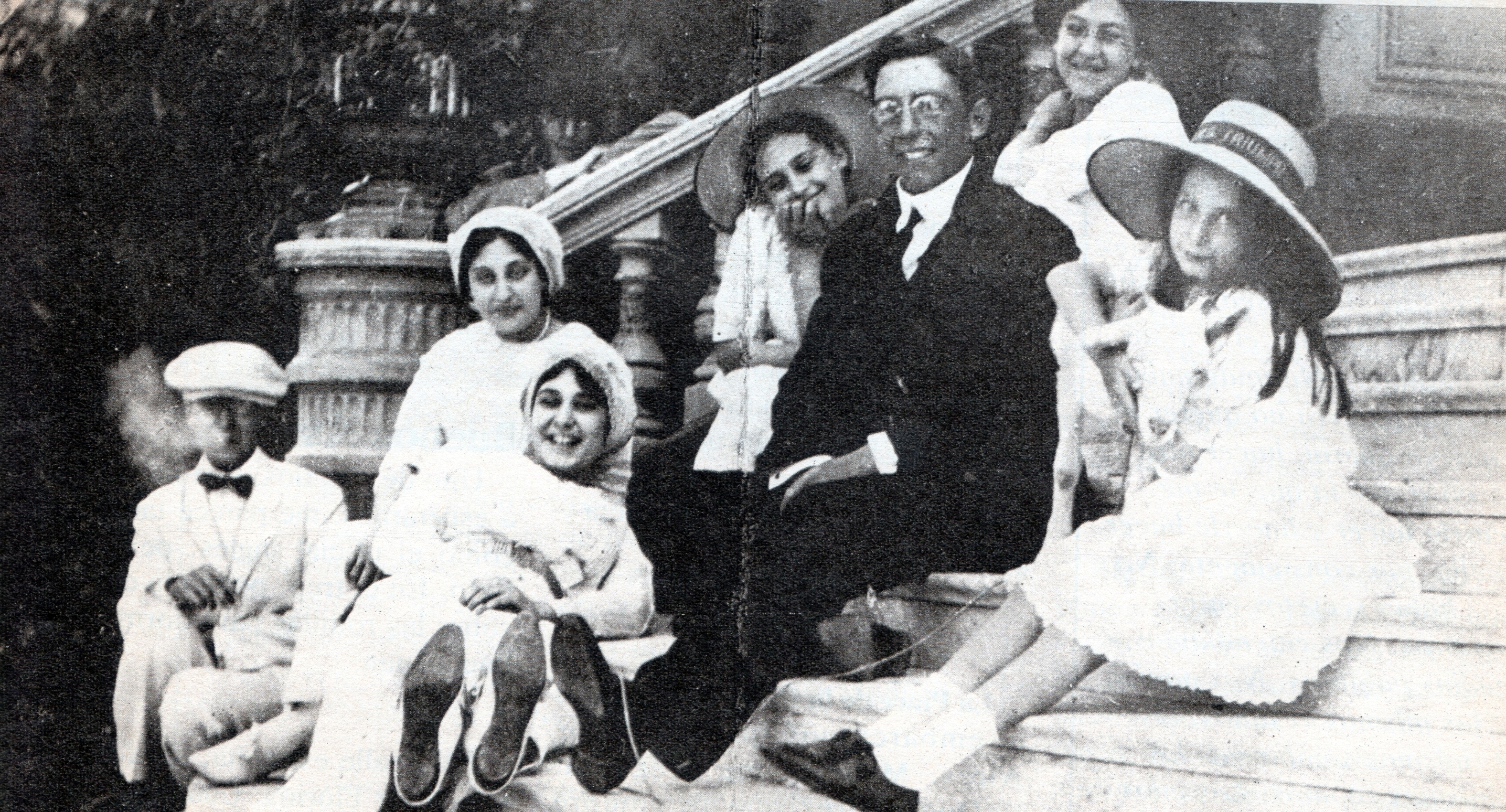
Ocampo sisters, circa 1908

Ocampo frequently collaborated with other writers. She wrote Los que aman, odian ("Those Who Love, Hate") with Bioy Casares in 1946, and with J. R. Wilcock she published the theatrical work Los Traidores in 1956. With Borges and Bioy Casares, Ocampo co-authored the celebrated Antología de la literatura fantástica in 1940, and also the Antología poética Argentina in 1941.

Before turning to writing, Ocampo had studied painting in Paris under the cubist Fernand Léger and proto-surrealist Giorgio de Chirico. Ocampo did not abandon her artistic training; she produced illustrations for Borges' poetry and painted throughout her life. Borges perceived a connection between Ocampo's painting and poetry, writing that "like Rosetti and Blake, Silvina has come to poetry by the luminous paths of drawing and painting, and the immediacy and certainty of the visual image persist in her written pages."

Unpublished works by Ocampo are part of the Silvina Ocampo Collection at the University of Notre Dame.

Ocampo was awarded Argentina's National Prize for Poetry in 1962, among other literary awards.

=== First publications ===
Ocampo published her first book of short stories, Viaje olvidado, in 1937. Most of the stories do not exceed two pages in length. The book was reviewed by Victoria Ocampo in Sur, where she remarked on the autobiographical aspects of the stories and reproached her sister for having "distorted" those childhood memories. Sur played a foundational role in the life of Ocampo, facilitating her connections with Borges, Bioy, Wilcock, and others in her circle. It was in this magazine where the first stories, poems, and translations of Ocampo appeared.

Despite the initial negative reviews of Viaje olvidado, the book came to be considered a fundamental text within the writer's collection of works, introducing readers to the features and themes that would characterize her future works. A few years later, Ocampo collaborated with Borges and Bioy Casares in the preparation of two anthologies: Antología de la literatura fantástica (1940), with a prologue by Bioy, and Antología poética Argentina (1941). In 1942, she introduced her first two books of poetry, Enumeración de la Patria and Espacios métricos. From then on, she alternated writing narratives with poetry.

In 1948, she published Autobiografía de Irene, stories where she shows a greater fluency in writing and a greater influence of Borges and Bioy appears. Despite this, the book did not have much impact at the time of its appearance. Two years earlier she had written a crime novel with Bioy Casares, Los que aman, odian.

After several years of publishing only poetry (Los sonetos del jardín, Poemas de amor desesperado, Los nombres, which won the National Poetry Prize) she returned to writing stories in 1959 with La furia, with which she finally obtained some recognition. La furia is often considered the point in which Ocampo reached the fullness of her style.

=== The 1960s and 70s ===
Ocampo was somewhat less active in terms of editorial presence in the 1960s, as she only published the volume of short stories, Las invitadas (1961), and the poetry book, Lo amargo por dulce (1962). In contrast, she was somewhat more fruitful during the 1970s. During these years, Ocampo published the poems Amarillo celeste, Árboles de Buenos Aires, and Canto escolar. She also published the story Los días de la noche and a series of children's stories: El cofre volante, El tobogán, El caballo alado, and La naranja maravillosa.

=== Last years and posthumous publications ===
The publication of her last two books, Y así sucesivamente (1987) and Cornelia frente al espejo (1988), coincided with her onset of Alzheimer's disease. The illness gradually reduced her faculties until leaving her debilitated during her last three years. She died in Buenos Aires on 14 December 1993, at the age of 90. She was buried in the family crypt of the Recoleta Cemetery, a cemetery where Bioy Casares is also buried.

Volumes of her unpublished texts appeared posthumously, including poetry and short novels. In 2006, four of her works were published: Invenciones del recuerdo (an autobiography written in free verse), Las repeticiones (a collection of unpublished short stories that includes two short novels), El vidente, and Lo mejor de la familia. In 2007, the novel La torre sin fin was published for the first time in Argentina, and in 2008, Ejércitos de la oscuridad appeared, a volume that includes various texts. All the material was edited by Sudamericana, which also reissued some of her short story collections. In 2011, La promesa was published, a novel that Ocampo began around 1963 and that, with long interruptions and rewrites, finished between 1988 and 1989, pressured by her illness. The edition was in the care of Ernesto Montequin.

== Critical reception ==
For most of her career, Argentine critics did not recognize the merit of Ocampo's works. Due to some extent to her relationship with Borges, her stories were criticized as not being "Borgesian enough." It was the veneration of Borges and her sister Victoria that prevented critics from understanding the formal and thematic originality of her stories. Instead, they saw them as a failure in their attempt to copy the style of these other writers. It was only in the 1980s that critics and writers began to recognize her talent and write about her legacy. Eminent representatives of Sur attempted to rescue Ocampo's short story collection, including Joseph Bianco, Sylvia Molloy, and Enrique Pezzoni.

Ocampo has been described as a shy woman who refused interviews and preferred a low profile. Critics wanted a firm statement about her position with respect to the "literary norm" so that they would know how to read her works and ensure that they were properly interpreting them, but they were unable to receive such a statement. In an interview with María Moreno—one of the few interviews Ocampo gave—Ocampo explained why she did not like to give interviews: "Tal vez porque protagonizo en ellas el triunfo del periodismo sobre la literatura” [Perhaps because I represent the triumph of journalism over literature in them].The only requirement that Ocampo put in order to be interviewed was that none of the questions be about literature. The only thing she said about the matter was the following: "Escribo porque no me gusta hablar, para dejar un testimonio más de la vida o para luchar contra ese exceso de materia que acostumbra a rodearnos. Pero si lo medito un poco, diré algo más banal" [I write because I don't like to talk, to leave one more testimony of life or to fight against that excess of matter that usually surrounds us. But if I ponder it a little, I'll say something else more banal].

Ocampo's habit of refusing to say much about her private life, methodology, and literature makes it difficult for critics to develop an analysis of her intentions. For Judith Podlubne, Ocampo's works are meta-literary. She says that the lack of information about where the writer comes from results in a dependence on literary norms. Sylvia Molloy suggests that criticism tries to reduce originality to something known, "reading what is read" instead of reading Ocampo's stories in their originality.

In recent years, critics have rediscovered Ocampo, and some unpublished works have been published in compilations such as Las repetitions y otros cuentos (2006) and Ejércitos de la oscuridad (2008).

=== Feminism ===
Because Ocampo has rarely had a direct say on feminist issues, it is not clear whether or not she considered herself a feminist. Depending on their interpretation of her works, critics have taken varying positions. Due to her association with Simone de Beauvoir through her sister Victoria, Amícola deduces that Ocampo was a feminist of the French and English tradition. Amícola states that it is evident that the Ocampo sisters were sensitive to the changes that were announced from France (and England) for the feminine question and, therefore, it is not inconsistent to try to think of Silvina Ocampo's stories as a special reading and putting into discourse what women perceive in the world.

Carolina Suárez-Hernán considers that Ocampo is a feminist or at least works from feminist angles. Suárez-Hernán bases her opinion on the context of Ocampo's literature, stating that Ocampo's literature contains a deep reflection on femininity and numerous demands for women's rights, as well as a critique of her situation in society. Ocampo finds different mechanisms of creation and deconstruction of the feminine. The women in her works are complex and present the dark side of femininity, and the multiple female representations shows an ambiguity that challenges the one-dimensional vision of the female character.

From three stories—"Cielo de claraboyas" (1937), "El vestido de terciopelo" (1959), y "La muñeca" (1970)—Amícola suggests that Ocampo's tales question the absence of sex-gender and of the feminine vision in psychoanalysis developed by Freud, with a special focus on the horrifying. Amícola does what Ocampo does not understand about the critics; she focuses too much on the horror of her stories and ignores the humor. Ocampo told Moreno her frustration: "Con mi prosa puedo hacer reír. ¿Será una ilusión? Nunca, ninguna crítica menciona mi humorismo" [With my prose I can make people laugh. Will it be an illusion? No critic ever mentions my humor].

In contrast, Suárez-Hernán proposes that the humor used in Ocampo's work helps to subvert female stereotypes. For Suárez-Hernán, Ocampo's work maintains a subversive and critical stance that finds pleasure in transgression. Established patterns are broken and roles are interchangeable; stereotypical oppositions of femininity and masculinity, good and evil, and beauty and ugliness are subjected to satirical treatment. Likewise, space and time are subverted and the boundaries between the mental categories of space, time, person, and animal are blurred.

When María Moreno asked her what she thought about feminism, Ocampo replied: "Mi opinión es un aplauso que me hace doler las manos" [My opinion is a round of applause that makes my hands hurt]. "¿Un aplauso que le molesta dispensar?" [An applause that bothers you to give?], questioned Moreno. "¡Por qué no se va al diablo!" [Why don't you go to hell!] was Ocampo's reply. Regarding the female vote in Argentina, Ocampo said, "Confieso que no me acuerdo. Me pareció tan natural, tan evidente, tan justo, que no juzgué que requería una actitud especial" [I confess that I do not remember. It seemed so natural, so evident, so fair, that I did not consider it required a special attitude].

=== Childhood and adulthood ===
Amícola suggests that Ocampo's intention is to create child characters that aim to demystify the idea of infantile innocence. Amícola proposes the example of confronting children versus adults to create a polarization. Suárez-Hernán also suggests that the children's narrative voice becomes a strategy to generate the ambiguity that is a part of the unreliable narrator; the reader always harbors doubts about the narrator's understanding of the facts as well as their credibility.

For Suárez-Hernán, the stories show the asymmetry between the world of adults and the world of children; parents, teachers, and governesses embody the sanctioning institution and are often nefarious figures. Suárez-Hernán considers that women, children, and the poor in Ocampo's work act in a subordinate position dominated by stereotypes. According to Suárez-Hernán, the world of childhood is privileged over adulthood as an appropriate space to subvert social structures; thus, the child's gaze will be the instrument to undermine the structural bases and transgress established limits. However, Suárez-Hernán believes that the powers attributed to the girl and her perversity generate disturbance in the reader who cannot avoid identifying with the adult woman.

== Themes ==
Ocampo's work has fantastical qualities, like her contemporary Borges. Critics note that Ocampo's writing particularly focused on transformations, such as metamorphosis, doubling, splitting, and fragmenting of the self.

Critic Cynthia Duncan, from the University of Tennessee, contends that the fantastical elements concealed latent feminist themes:

[Ocampo's] female characters, like Cristina, are not radical, outspoken feminists. They do not overtly criticize their husbands, nor do they rebel in predictable ways. They go about their lives quietly and submissively, until the fantastic intervenes to upset the traditional order that has been imposed on them. It is, perhaps, this aspect of Silvina Ocampo's work which makes it most disquieting to readers, male and female alike.

Another critic, Patricia N. Klingenberg, has argued that the "raging, destructive female characters of Ocampo's stories should be viewed as part of her preoccupation with the victimization and revenge of women, children and 'deviants' in her works."

Ocampo reportedly said that the judges for Argentina's National Prize for fiction in 1979 adjudged her work "demasiado crueles"—too cruel—for the award.

=== Reflexivity ===
The theme of reflexivity is present in many of Ocampo's works. The concept of reflexivity can be defined, in terms of literal objects, as a representation of " . . . identity and otherness," and as a link with other texts. In her collection of short stories La furia, the repetition of objects such as mirrors, light, glass objects, and clocks is observed. The use of reflected light and the objects that reflect it are found many times throughout the works. Some authors such as María Dolores Rajoy Feijoo interpret these reflective objects, such as mirrors and watches, as vehicles of self-reflexivity, and the modified and reproduced identity, in the fantastic tales of Ocampo: "Instead of seeing the reflected room, I saw something outside in the mirror, a dome, a kind of temple with yellow columns and, deep down, inside some niches in the wall, divinities. I was undoubtedly the victim of an illusion" (Cornelia in front of the mirror).

=== Childhood ===
Childhood is a recurring theme in Ocampo's tales. Although the use of the infantile perspective is something in common with other Latin American authors, Ocampo is distinguished by her perversion of the infantile perspective. Childhood's sense of perversion has led many critics to make psychological connections between her tales and Freudian theories. According to Fiona Joy Mackintosh, Freud's ideas, specifically his ideas about dreams, the taboo, and the polymorphous perversion of children, are some of the key elements that lurk as a ubiquitous harbinger within the lines of text in Ocampo's stories. Ocampo also experiments with the consequences of living in a world separated from adult society in "La raza inextinguible," but she also explores elements involved in the aging process and alludes that there are positive effects implicit in the characters who mix childhood traits with those of adults. One of her most notable works on the theme of childhood perversion is "El pecado mortal," which recounts the deception of a girl by a servant. Then the girl makes her first communion without confessing her sin. Some critics have interpreted this story as an intercession of the perversion of childhood, the awakening of sexual identity, and the incorporation of various social classes and the subversion of power that these sexual acts entail.

=== Metamorphosis ===
In many of her stories, Ocampo uses physical and psychological changes (characterized as metamorphosis) to transform many of her characters. These include the transition from people to plants (the human-plant hybridism in "Sabanas de Tierra"), into animals (the human-feline hybridism in "El rival"), into machines (the human-inanimate hybridism "El automóvil"), and in other people (for example, "Amado en el amado").

Ocampo uses gradual changes in her short story "Sabanas de tierra" to highlight the metamorphic process of a gardener in a plant. These changes are typically noted by their transitions in senses and actions, for example, sound, smell, visual changes, and taste. According to Juan Ramón Vélez García, many of these processes of metamorphosis indicate biblical connections in Genesis. Vélez García interprets the transformative features of the characters as a cycle or return, highlighting the biblical phrase "pulvis es et in pulverem reverteris" (Vélez García K.R. 2006). The characters in "Sabanas de tierra" do not have proper names. Ishak Farag Fahim believes that this reflects an attempt to generalize the ideas and worldview that the story seeks to communicate.

== Legacy ==
Ocampo's own merit as a writer has been overshadowed by her associations with her sister Victoria Ocampo, her husband Adolfo Bioy Casares, and her friend Jorge Luis Borges. In recent years, however, Ocampo's work has been newly translated into English, bringing greater awareness to Ocampo's accomplishments as a writer.

Ocampo is buried at La Recoleta Cemetery in Buenos Aires.

== Selected works ==
=== Short stories and novellas ===
- Viaje olvidado (Buenos Aires: Sur, 1937). Forgotten Journey, trans. by Suzanne Jill Levine and Katie Lateef-Jan (City Lights, 2019).
- Los que aman, odian (novella with Adolfo Bioy Casares) (Buenos Aires: Emecé, 1946). Where There's Love, There's Hate, trans. by Suzanne Jill Levine and Jessica Powell (Melville House, 2013).
- Autobiografía de Irene (Buenos Aires: Sur, 1948). Autobiography of Irene
- La furia (Buenos Aires: Sur, 1959). The Fury
- Las invitadas (Buenos Aires: Losada, 1961). The Guests
- Los días de la noche (Buenos Aires: Sudamericana, 1970). Days of Night
- Y así sucesivamente (Barcelona: Tusquets, 1987). And So Forth
- Cornelia frente al espejo (Barcelona: Tusquets, 1988). Cornelia Before the Mirror
- Leopoldina's Dream. Selection of 32 stories translated by Daniel Balderston (Penguin, 1988).
  - Thus Were Their Faces (New York Review Books, 2015). Revised and expanded edition of Leopoldina's Dream with ten additional stories. Published in the UK as The Imposter and Other Stories (2021).
- La torre sin fin (novella) (2007). The Topless Tower, trans. by James Womack (Hesperus Press, 2010).
- La promesa (novella) (Buenos Aires: Lumen, 2011). The Promise, trans. by Suzanne Jill Levine and Jessica Powell (City Lights, 2019).

=== Poetry ===
- Espacios métricos (Buenos Aires: Sur, 1942).
- Enumeración de la patria (Buenos Aires: Sur, 1942).
- Los sonetos del jardín (Buenos Aires: Sur, 1946).
- Poemas de amor desesperado (Buenos Aires: Sudamericana, 1949).
- Los nombres (Buenos Aires: Emecé, 1953).
- Los traidores (a theatrical piece in verse written in collaboration with Juan Rodolfo Wilcock) (Buenos Aires: Losange, 1956).
- Lo amargo por dulce (Buenos Aires: Emecé, 1962).
- Amarillo celeste (Buenos Aires: Losada, 1972).
- Árboles de Buenos Aires (Buenos Aires: Crea, 1979).
- Canto Escolar (Buenos Aires: Fraterna, 1979).
- Breve Santoral (Buenos Aires: Ediciones de arte Gaglianone, 1985.
- Silvina Ocampo (New York Review Books, 2015). Selection of poems translated by Jason Weiss.

=== Children's stories ===
- El cofre volante (Buenos Aires: Estrada, 1974).
- El tobogán (Buenos Aires: Estrada, 1975).
- El caballo alado (Buenos Aires: De la flor, 1976).
- La naranja maravillosa (Buenos Aires: Sudamericana, 1977).

=== Anthologies ===
- Antología de la literatura fantástica, Buenos Aires, Sudamericana, 1940. translated as The Book of Fantasy, 1988
- Antología poética Argentina, Buenos Aires, Sudamericana, 1941.
- Pequeña antología, Buenos Aires, Editorial Ene, 1954.
- El pecado mortal (anthology of relatos), Buenos Aires, Eudeba, 1966.
- Informe del cielo y del infierno (anthology of relatos), prologue by Edgardo Cozarinsky, Caracas, Monte Ávila, 1970.
- La continuación y otras páginas, Buenos Aires, Centro Editor de América Latina, 1981.
- Encuentros con Silvina Ocampo, dialogues with Noemí Ulla, Buenos Aires, Editorial de Belgrano, 1982.
- Páginas de Silvina Ocampo, selections by the author, prologue by Enrique Pezzoni, Buenos Aires, Editorial Celtia, 1984.
- Las reglas del secreto (anthology), Fondo de Cultura Económica, 1991.
- Poemas, Emily Dickinson, translated by Silvina Ocampo, prologue by Jorge Luis Borges, España, Tusquets, 1997

== Awards and honors ==
- 1945: Premio Municipal de Poesía, for Espacios métricos
- 1953: Segundo Premio Nacional de Poesía, for Los nombres
- 1954: Premio Municipal de Literatura
- 1962: Premio Nacional de Poesía, for Lo amargo por dulce
- 1988: Premio del Club de los 13, for Cornelia frente al espejo
- 1992: Gran Premio de Honor de la SADE
