= Villa Ocampo =

Coordinates: 34°27′29″S 58°31′06″W

- Exterior view of the mansion
- Alternative names: House of Victoria Ocampo

General information
- Type: Mansion
- Architectural style: Eclectic
- Location: Elortondo 1811/37, Béccar, Argentina
- Opened: 1891; 135 years ago
- Renovated: 2003–13
- Owner: List: Manuel S. Ocampo (1891–1931); Ramona Aguirre (1931–35); Victoria Ocampo (1935–1973); UNESCO (1973–present)

National Historic Monument of Argentina
- Designated: 1997

Villa Ocampo is a mansion and the former house of Victoria Ocampo (1890–1979), one of Argentina's greatest cultural figures, founder and director of Sur magazine.

The house is located in Béccar, a city in San Isidro Partido, Argentina. After being restored by UNESCO, it became the "Casa Museo Villa Ocampo" in 2013.

== History ==
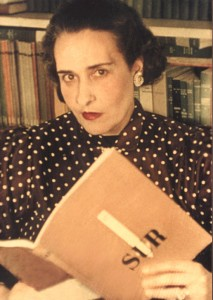
Writer Silvina Ocampo lived in the house from 1941 to 1973

The Villa was built in 1891 by Manuel Silvino Cecilio Ocampo (1860–1931), Victoria's father.

Following the deaths of Victoria's parents—Manuel Ocampo in 1931 and her mother, Ramona Aguirre, in 1935, the inheritance was divided among the five sisters (Clara had passed away at age eleven due to juvenile diabetes). And since Angélica —Victoria's sister, born in 1892— was exceptionally close to the writer, "they never divided the portion they both received, which consisted of the entire house plus the adjacent hectare".

Villa Ocampo was also a regular meeting place for Argentine writers, among them Jorge Luis Borges and Adolfo Bioy Casares, who met there for the first time in 1931. It was the inspiration for the Blue Villa in Alain Robbe-Grillet's 1965 novel La Maison de rendez-vous.

The house has been owned by UNESCO since 1973, after Victoria donated the property.. It was fully restored during ten years (2003–13) and opened as a cultural center.

Villa Ocampo was designated National Historic Monument of Argentina in 1997.

== Style ==
Its architecture is eclectic, combining influences of British and French origin. The house is surrounded by an 11,000 m^{2} historical garden and hosts an important collection of art, furnishings and a library of 12,000 books, photographs, letters and personal papers of Victoria Ocampo.

== Notable guests ==
Originally the summer house of the Ocampo family, it became Victoria Ocampo's permanent residence in 1940. The house is famous for its list of distinguished visitors who came to Argentina invited by Victoria: Rabindranath Tagore, Igor Stravinsky, Le Corbusier, Albert Camus, Gabriela Mistral, Graham Greene, Federico García Lorca, André Malraux, José Ortega y Gasset, Antoine de Saint-Exupéry, Saint-John Perse (Alexis Léger), María Elena Walsh, Indira Gandhi, Octavio Paz, Pablo Neruda, among many others.

== Gallery ==
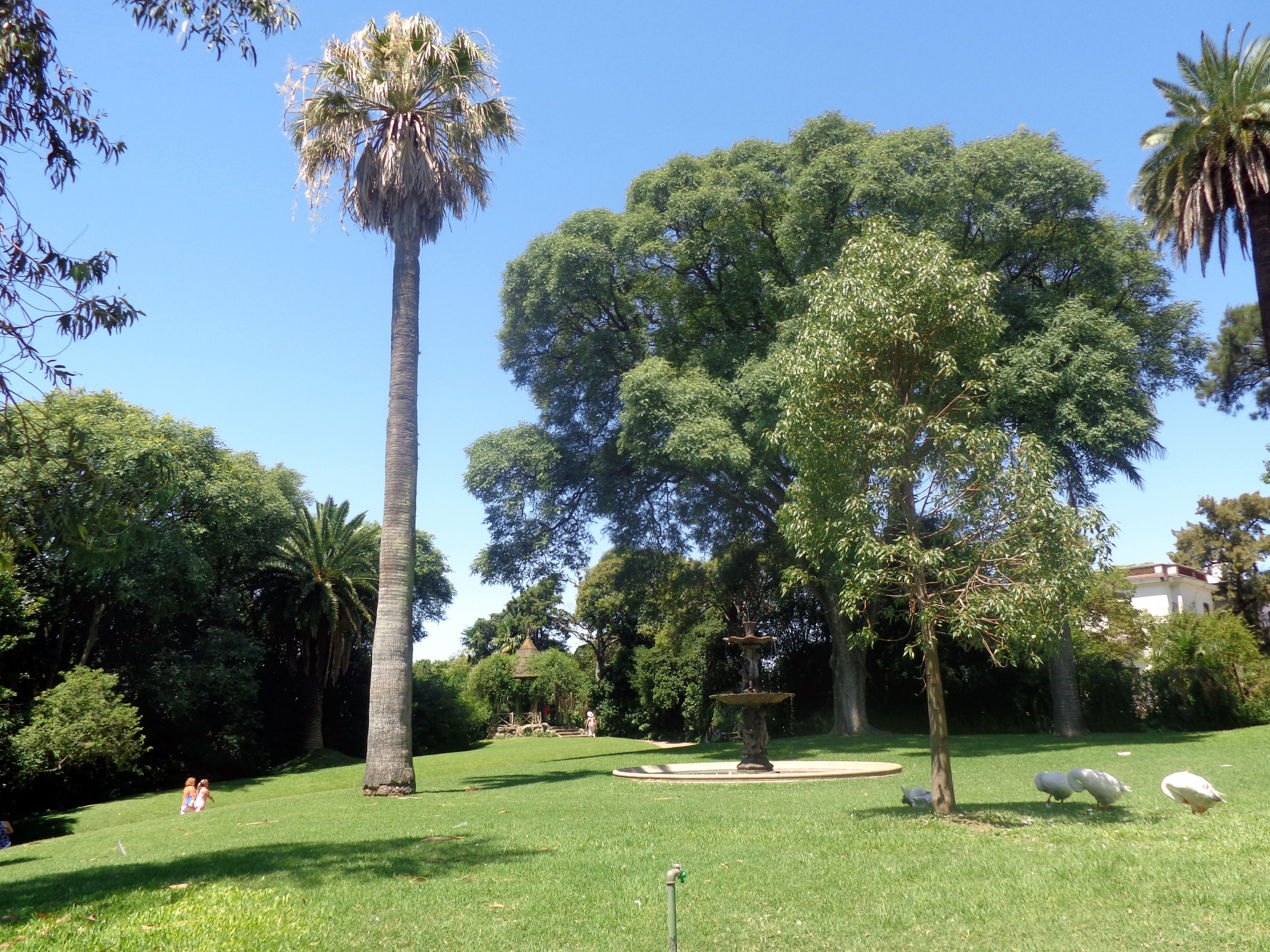
Garden

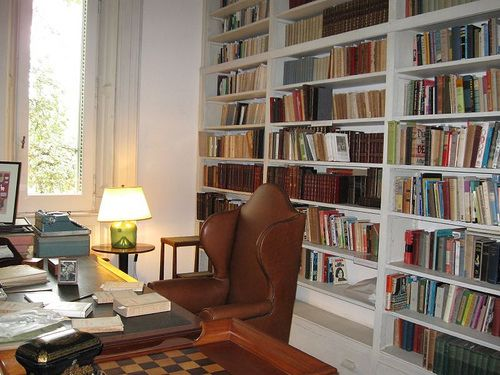
Library

Stairs

Balcony

Room

Room

Room

Bedroom

Bathroom
