= H. A. Murena =

Argentine writer and poet

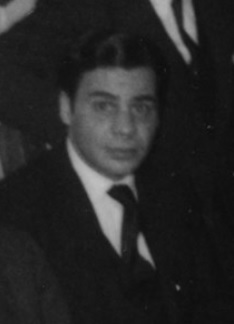
- Murena in 1969
- Born: Héctor A. Murena; February 14, 1923; Buenos Aires, Argentina
- Died: May 6, 1975 (aged 52); Buenos Aires, Argentina
- Education: University of Buenos Aires; National University of La Plata
- Occupations: Writer; translator

Héctor Alberto Álvarez Murena (1923–1975), better known under his pen name of H. A. Murena, was an Argentine writer, essayist, poet, and translator. He wrote over twenty books on various topics, and was an important disseminator of German thought into the Spanish-speaking world. He is perhaps best remembered for Las Leyes de la Noche (1958), translated into English as The Laws of the Night. In addition to his books, Murena was a contributor to the Argentinian literary review Sur, and to Argentinian newspaper La Nación.

Murena was married to Argentine author Sara Gallardo from 1970 until his death in 1975.

== Works ==
=== Prose ===
- First Testament (Primer testamento), 1946
- Fragments of the secret annals (Fragmentos de los anales secretos), 1948
- The fate of the bodies ( La fatalidad de los cuerpos), 1955
- The Center of Hell (El centro del infierno), 1957
- Homo Atomicus (Homo atómicus), 1962
- Essays on subversion (Ensayos sobre subversión), 1962
- The original sin of America (El pecado original de América), 1965
- The secret name (El nombre secreto), 1969
- Epitalámica, 1969
- The Cavalry Colonel and Other Stories (El coronel de caballería y otros relatos), 1971
- The prison of the mind (La cárcel de la mente), 1971
- Metaphor and the sacred (La metáfora y lo sagrado), 1973
- The Clear Secret. Dialogues with D. J. Vogelman (El secreto claro. Diálogos con D. J. Vogelman), 1979

=== Poetry ===
- The New Life (La nueva vida), 1951
- The Circle of Paradises (El círculo de los paraísos), 1958
- The Scandal and the Fire (El escándalo y el fuego), 1959
- The Demon of Harmony (El demonio de la armonía), 1964
- F. G.: a Barbarian Among Beauty (F. G. : un bárbaro entre la belleza), 1972
- The Eagle That Disappears (El águila que desaparece), 1975

=== Play ===
- The Judge (El juez)
