= The Celestial Plot =

- First edition
- Author: Adolfo Bioy Casares
- Original title: La trama celeste
- Genre: Collection of short stories
- Publication place: Argentina

The Celestial Plot (Spanish: La trama celeste) is a book by Adolfo Bioy Casares. It is a collection of short stories and includes a work with the same name.

== Contents ==
- "La memoria de Paulina"
- "De los reyes futuros"
- "El ídolo"
- "La trama celeste"
- "El otro laberinto"
- "El perjurio de la nieve"

== Plot ==
A soldier must pilot a new plane. He suffers an accident and is injured. He is interrogated and the army does not believe he is from Argentina. They mistake him for a spy. He calls his friends and nobody recognizes him. He cannot explain the situation, but a friend of his, the author, helps him. The author discovers the truth: the soldier has travelled to a parallel universe, a little different from this one.
