= H. Bustos Domecq =

Pseudonym by the Argentine writers Jorge Luis Borges and Adolfo Bioy Casares

H. Bustos Domecq (Honorio Bustos Domecq) is a pseudonym used for several collaborative works by the Argentine writers Jorge Luis Borges and Adolfo Bioy Casares.

== Origin ==
Bustos Domecq made his first appearance as F. (Francisco) Bustos, the pseudonym under which Borges, in 1933, published his first fictional story, now known as "Hombre de la esquina rosada", ("Man from the Pink Corner") but originally titled "Hombre de las orillas" ("Man from the Slums" or more literally "Man from the Outskirts"), Francisco Bustos being the name of "one forefather's forefather".

He changed his first initial and acquired a second surname (which in Argentina connotes either "old money" or simply, as in the rest of Latin America, a maternal last name) as Borges and Bioy Casares later used the pseudonym "H. Bustos Domecq" for some of their lighter works. According to Borges, Bustos was the name of one of his great-grandfathers, while Domecq was the name of one of Bioy's great-grandfathers.

== Works ==
Jacket of Norman Thomas Di Giovanni's English translation of Crónicas de Bustos Domecq (Dutton edition, 1979, ISBN 0-525-47548-6).

H. Bustos Domecq was the original credited author of the parodic detective stories in Seis problemas para don Isidro Parodi, 1942 (translated 1981 as Six Problems for Don Isidro Parodi) and Dos fantasías memorables, 1946 (Two memorable fancies).

Bustos was also the alleged author of Crónicas de Bustos Domecq, 1967, (translated by Norman Thomas di Giovanni as Chronicles of Bustos Domecq (1976)), and Nuevos Cuentos de Bustos Domecq (1977), even though the authors' actual names were featured on the covers of both books.

Under another pseudonym, "Benito Suárez Lynch" (both surnames were taken from the authors' illustrious ancestors), Borges and Bioy published the parodic mystery Un modelo para la muerte (A model for death) in 1946, featuring the characters of the Isidro Parodi stories.

The pair also did some collaborations without the use of the pseudonym, notably two movie scripts from 1955: Los orilleros (Slum-dwellers) and El paraíso de los creyentes (The Paradise of Believers). Both dealt with the exacerbated sense of manhood among the compadritos in the slums of Buenos Aires circa 1900.

The Bustos Domecq materials provided comic relief for cultivated Latin Americans, but also, famously, conveyed a subtle yet unambiguous pro-allied message in the 1942 edition of Parodi – which was not a surprise for people who knew the authors but was, nevertheless, a contrarian statement given the state of Argentine politics at the time.

Note: The Isidro Parodi appears as Isidoro in some editions.

== Influence ==
According to Emir Rodríguez Monegal in his April 1968 article "Nota sobre Biorges", when Adolfo Bioy Casares and Jorge Luis Borges collaborated under the pseudonyms H. Bustos Domecq or B. Suárez Lynch, the results seemed written by a new personality, more than the sum of its parts, which he dubbed "Biorges" and considered in his own right as "one of the most important Argentine prose writers of his time", for having influenced writers such as Leopoldo Marechal (an otherwise anti-Borgesian), or Julio Cortázar's use of fictional language and slang in his masterpiece Hopscotch.
