= The Hero of Women =

First edition (publ. Emece)

The Hero of Women (Spanish: El héroe de las mujeres) is a book by Argentine writer Adolfo Bioy Casares published in 1978. It is a collection of short stories and includes a work with that same name.

== Contents ==
- "De la forma del mundo"
- "Otra esperanza"
- "Una guerra perdida"
- "Lo desconocido atrae a la juventud"
- "La pasajera de primera clase"
- "El jardin de los sueños"
- "Una puerta se abre"
- "El héroe de las mujeres"
