= La aventura de un fotógrafo en La Plata =

1985 novel by Adolfo Bioy Casares

- Author: Adolfo Bioy Casares
- Language: Spanish
- Publication date: 1985
- Publication place: Argentina

La aventura de un fotógrafo en La Plata is an Argentine novel, written by Adolfo Bioy Casares. It was first published in 1985. In the prologue to the 2005 edition, the author admits that it is possible that the novel alludes, subconsciously, to the desaparecidos, stating, “I do not believe that one can have such a terrible nightmare and refrain from writing about it in the morning.”

== Plot ==
Nicolasito Almanza, a young man from the province of Buenos Aires, arrives in La Plata, having been assigned by his boss to photograph the main buildings and points of interest there, such as the famous cathedral, the Museum of Natural Science, the College of Science, and the train station.

As soon as Nicolasito gets off the train from Las Flores, he runs into the Lombardo family: a stubborn father with his three daughters, one of whom is carrying along a baby of her own. Almost immediately, Nicolasito is persuaded by the family to stay with them. The family stays in somewhat strange lodgings that are much nicer than Nicolasito's. Nicolasito's roommate Mascardi, a boy from the country whom Nicolasito hasn't seen in a long time and who has since become a (slightly shady) policeman, is suspicious of the sudden friendship between Nicolasito and the Lombardo family.

Relentlessly trying to finish his project as well as possible, Nicolasito ends up confronting endless impediments, stemming from his relationships with the Lombardos and with a host of other characters, including: Mascardi, old Gruter and his assistant Gladys, the Lombardo's landlady, Mr. Lemonier and his girlfriend Laura, and Lo Pietro the undertaker and his helper known as "el mono." Running around the city, Nicolasito finds himself in a foggy and fantasmagorical atmosphere in which two teams – the Lombardos vs. everyone else – are fighting over him.
