= Gustavo Thorlichen =

Gustavo (Gustav) Thorlichen
- Gustavo Thorlichen exhibits his photographs in the municipal gallery of Alhaurín El Grande in Malaga, Spain c.1970s. Photographer unknown.
- Born: Gustav Thorlichen; 1906; Germany
- Died: 12 November 1986 (aged 79–80)
- Known for: Photography, painting

Gustavo (a.k.a. Gustav) Thorlichen (1906–1986) was a German-born landscape, social reportage and architectural photographer and modernist painter who migrated to, and worked, in Argentina from his late twenties.

His photographs promoting his adopted country became iconic through multiple reprinting of his books, particularly La República Argentina published in 22 editions between 1958 and 1999 in 3 languages.

Gentle and convivial, he befriended and photographed citizens and political and cultural celebrities including Victoria Ocampo, Eva Duarte and Juan Perón, Jorge Luis Borges and Ernesto 'Che' Guevara.

In his parallel career as a painter Thorlichen followed Cubist, surrealist and abstract styles in thousands of artworks, which are now held and exhibited in Malaga, Spain where he lived from age 63 until his death.

== Establishment in South America ==
Fleeing the rise of Nazism, Gustavo Thorlichen arrived in Argentina from Germany in c.1933 and by the 1940s had established a studio on the Reconquista between Corrientes and Sarmiento.

In 1941 Argentine writer and intellectual Victoria Ocampo hired Thorlichen to photograph for a volume on her home at San Isidro that included a poem by Silvina Ocampo. She declared the 68 shots he had taken “excellent". Also during this period he portrayed Harcourt Algeranoff (1903-1967) in various roles in performances of the Ballets Russes (ca.1942). An exhibition of his work was held at the Kraft Gallery, Buenos Aires in 1948.

Thorlichen approached the blind writer Jorge Luis Borges in 1948 to write the preface for his book “Argentina” that was published by the National Tourism Board in 1958 to promote the Argentine pavilion at the Industrial Exhibition in Brussels that year. Borges wrote: ”The picturesque is the exception in this country and does not feel like Argentina. Hence it difficult to capture in a limited series of images these sullen and almost abstract realities, hence the uniqueness of Thorlichen's feat in capturing it with clarity, passion and happiness”.

By 1951 Thorlichen had set up a studio at Lavalle 572 Buenos Aires and was featured in the U.S. magazine Photography. Along with Juan Di Sandro and Annemarie Heinrich he was among the favorite photographers of both the public and leading journalistic and cultural organisations.

In July 1953 Thorlichen was in Bolivia photographing a tin mine for the revolutionary government of Victor Paz Estenssoro, when during an exhibition of his work he met Ernesto ‘Che’ Guevara, who was then on his second trip to South America, and accompanied him to photograph various locations on the outskirts of La Paz. Che noted in his Motorcycle Diaries that "Gustavo Thorlichen is a great artist and photographer". Ernesto wrote. "I had a chance to see how he works. His mastery of a simple technique subordinated entirely to a methodical composition results in photos of remarkable value." [“Gustavo Thorlichen es un gran artista como fotógrafo”, escribió Ernesto. “Tuve oportunidad de ver su manera de trabajar. Domina una técnica sencilla subordinada íntegramente a una composición metódica que da como resultado fotos de notable valor”.] The meeting revealed to Che the propaganda potential of photography and he purchased his own camera shortly thereafter.

He was commissioned as personal photographer to Argentine leader Juan Peron and his wife, Eva Duarte. His photographs were exhibited in galleries throughout Europe, America and Japan, and a 50.8 cm x 64.77 cm (20” x 25½”) print of his image of a female Bolivian stone breaker nursing her baby was included by Edward Steichen in the section ‘Work’ of the 1955 world-touring Museum of Modern Art blockbuster The Family of Man.

== Later life and legacy ==
After 1955, Thorlichen returned to painting, and after 1970, when he settled in Torremolinos in Southern Spain, exhibited his photographs in the municipal gallery of Alhaurin El Grande, Malaga, where there is a foundation that bears his name.

He died 12 November 1986 of cancer in Alhaurín el Grande and bequeathed 2,500 of his paintings and photographs to the town. Due to costs of management, the works languished, forgotten and unexhibited until 2000, when they were restored ready for regular showing.

Salman Rushdie in Joseph Anton: A Memoire recounts how Manuel Cortés, who is featured in the film Thirty Years of Darkness, a former mayor of the town of Mijas in the province of Malaga, "met a photographer of German origin named Gustavo Thorlichen, a tall, handsome man with aquiline features sleek silver hair and three good stories to tell"; the first being of his commission to be the Peróns' photographer, the second, about how he met Che Guevara, and lastly, of his meeting Jorge Luis Borges in a bookshop and boldly asking him to write the preface for his Argentina.

== Selected exhibitions ==
- 1948: Kraft Gallery, photography.
- 1954: Tale of the Wayward
- 2003: restored paintings shown posthumously in Cuevas del Convento in Alhaurín el Grande, Malaga, Spain.
- 2015: Posthumous exhibition Objective Tranversal of Thorlichen's "Serie Geometric" paintings. The inaugural exhibition of the 'Pacífico 54' public gallery of the Provincial Council of Malaga, 30 January to 27 February 2015.

== Publications ==
- Ocampo, V., & Thorlichen, G. (1941). San Isidro. Buenos Aires: Sur. (Spanish)
- Thorlichen, G., Paz, E. V., Baptista, G. M., & Lynch, P. (1955). El indio. La Paz: Editorial S.P.I.C. (5 editions published in 1955 in Spanish and English)
- Thorlichen, G. (1955). El precio del estaño. La Paz, Bolivia: Editorial S.P.I.C. (4 editions published in 1955 in Spanish)
- Thorlichen, G. (1956). La Paz. La Paz: Ediciones de la "Biblioteca Paceña". (5 editions published between 1956 and 1965 in Spanish)
- Thorlichen, G. (1958). La República Argentina. Buenos Aires: Editorial Sudamericana. (22 editions published between 1958 and 1999 in 3 languages)
- Thorlichen, G., & Hernani, M. (1962). Buenos Aires. México: Hermes.
- Thorlichen, G. (1962). Gustavo Thorlichen. Hernani, M. ., & Thorlichen, G. (1963). Visioni di Buenos Aires. Novara.
- Thorlichen, G., Fundación Gustavo Thorlichen, & Málaga (Provincia). (2014). Objetivo transversal: Del 30 de enero al 27 de febrero 2015, Espacio Expositivo Diputación de Málaga. Málaga: Delegación de Cultura, CEDMA. (Spanish)
