= Jockey Club (Buenos Aires) =

Gentlemen's club in Argentina

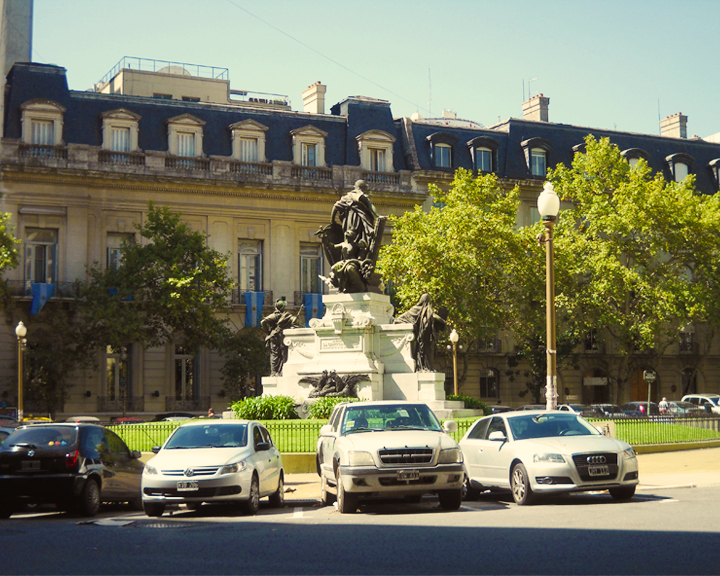
Current headquarters of the Jockey Club on Alvear Avenue with the monument of Carlos Pellegrini

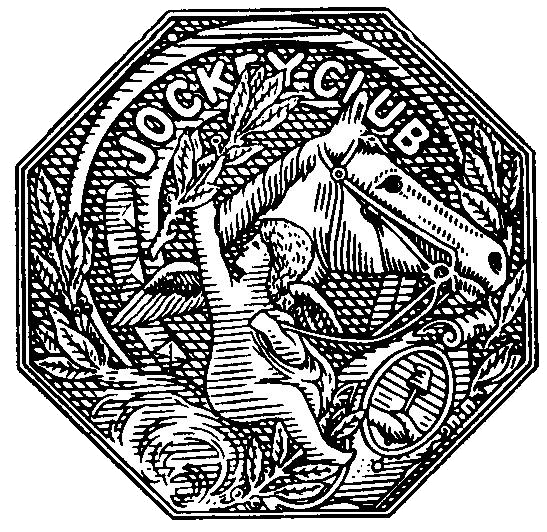
Jockey Club logo

The Jockey Club is a club in Buenos Aires, Argentina, founded on April 15, 1882 by President Carlos Pellegrini and a group of "gentlemen representing the political and economic activity of Argentina." The Jockey Club gather all male members of the elite that make up the aristocracy of Argentina.

Irrespective of its name, the club is not only a jockey club but principally a place for meetings of the members. When it was created, the possession of horses and countries was related to power and relations with the ruling class of Argentina.

The principal headquarters are at Avenida Alvear, one of the most exclusive parts of Buenos Aires.

During the presidency of Juan Domingo Perón on 15 April 1953, the headquarters at Florida Street were destroyed by Perón's supporters, who wanted to attack the symbols of the high class of Argentina after the bombing of Plaza de Mayo.

Two historically significant golf courses, Jockey Club (Red) and Jockey Club (Blue) were designed by golf architect Alister Mackenzie in 1930. Mackenzie stated in his book The Spirit of St. Andrews:

The course has a greater resemblance not only in appearance but in the character of its golf to the Old Course at St. Andrews than any inland course I know.

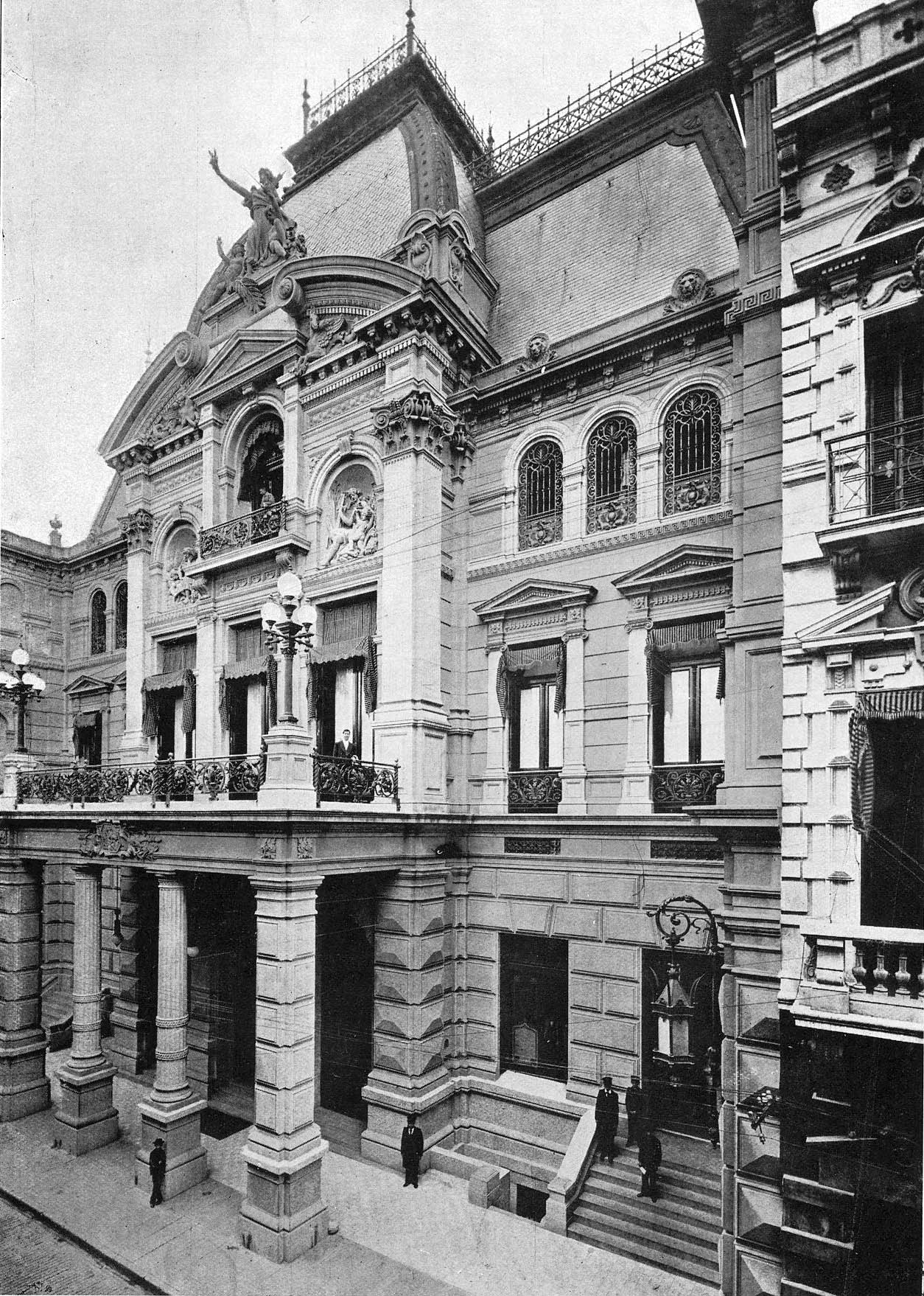
Old headquarters of the Jockey Club, on Florida Street, destroyed in 1953

In San Isidro, the Hipódromo de San Isidro was inaugurated on December 8, 1935.

In 1940, the construction of the golf clubhouse was followed by the construction of the first two polo fields. Ultimately, seven polo fields were built in conjunction with swimming pools, tennis courts, and soccer fields.

== Golf history ==
Canada Cup, 1962

Shell's Wonderful World of Golf, 1962

Argentine Open, multiple

Alister Mackenzie Society, 2012
