= Victoria Ocampo =

Argentine writer (1890–1979)

Victoria Ocampo CBE
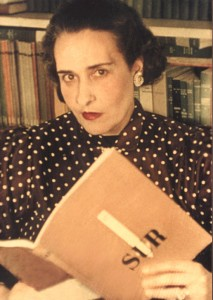
- Ocampo in 1931
- Born: Ramona Victoria Epifanía Rufina Ocampo; 7 April 1890; Buenos Aires, Argentina
- Died: 27 January 1979 (aged 88); Buenos Aires, Argentina
- Education: University of Paris
- Occupation: Writer
- Relatives: Silvina Ocampo (sister)

Ramona Victoria Epifanía Rufina Ocampo CBE (7 April 1890 – 27 January 1979) was an Argentine writer and intellectual. Best known as an advocate for others and as publisher of the literary magazine Sur, she was also a writer and critic in her own right and one of the most prominent South American women of her time. Her sister was Silvina Ocampo, also a writer. She was nominated for the Nobel Prize in Literature in 1970 and 1974.

== Biography ==
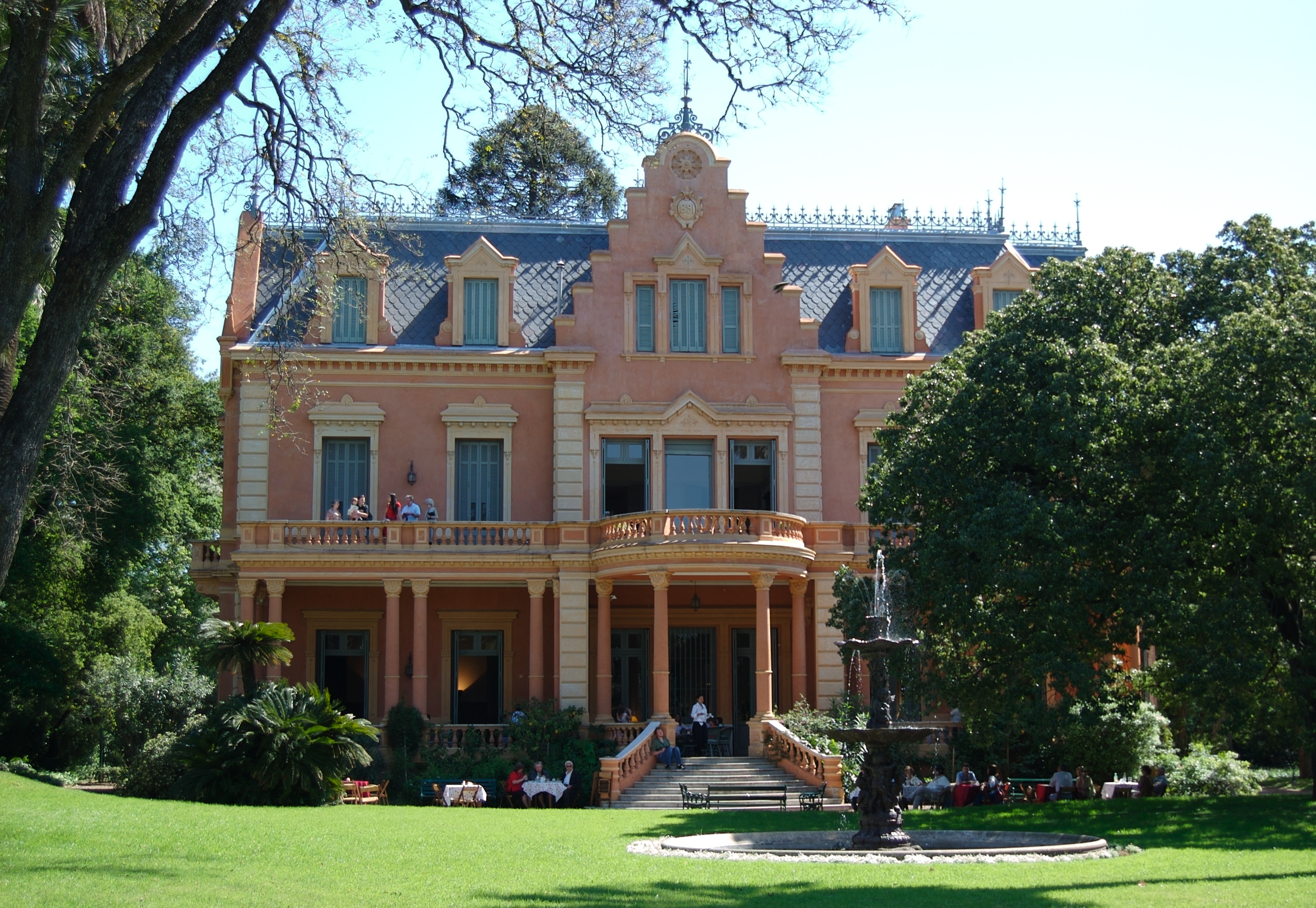
Villa Ocampo, the writer's San Isidro home, now a cultural center

Born Ramona Victoria Epifanía Rufina Ocampo in Buenos Aires into a high-society family, she was educated at home by a French governess. She later wrote: "the alphabet-book in which I learned to read was French, as was the hand that taught me to draw those first letters."

She is sometimes said to have attended the Sorbonne: on page 39 of her biography of Ocampo, Doris Meyer states that, during the family's 1906–1907 trip to Paris, the same during which she was etched by Paul César Helleu, the Ocampos allowed 17-year-old Victoria, "well-chaperoned," to audit some lectures at the Sorbonne and at the Collège de France. She remembered particularly enjoying Henri Bergson's lectures at the latter. She never matriculated at either. Her old traditional wealthy family frowned on formal education for women, so she had little. In 1912, Ocampo married Bernando de Estrada (also known as Monaco Estrada). The marriage was not happy; the couple separated in 1920, and Ocampo began a long–lasting affair with her husband's cousin Julián Martínez, a diplomat.

In Buenos Aires, she was a lynchpin of the intellectual scene of the 1920s and 1930s. Her first book, written in French, was De Francesca à Beatrice (c. 1923), a commentary on Dante's Divine Comedy. Other works include Domingos en Hyde Park; El Hamlet de Laurence Olivier; Emily Brontë (Terra incógnita); a series called Testimonios (ten volumes); Virginia Woolf, Orlando y Cía; San Isidro; 338171 T.E. (Lawrence of Arabia)–a biography of T. E. Lawrence–and a posthumously published autobiography. There is also an edited book of dialogues between Ocampo and Jorge Luis Borges.

Ocampo corresponded with Virginia Woolf throughout the 1930s; the two writers met multiple times, and their friendship ended in London in June 1939 when Ocampo invited a photographer friend, Gisele Freund, to take Woolf's picture, who famously disliked appearing in photographs.

Perhaps of greater significance than her own writing, she was founder (1931) and publisher of the magazine Sur, the most important literary magazine of its time in Latin America. Among the writers published in Sur were Borges, Ernesto Sabato, Adolfo Bioy Casares, Julio Cortázar, José Ortega y Gasset, Manuel Peyrou, Albert Camus, Enrique Anderson Imbert, José Bianco, Ezequiel Martínez Estrada, Pierre Drieu La Rochelle, Waldo Frank, Gabriela Mistral, Eduardo Mallea, and her own younger sister Silvina Ocampo.

In 1935, Ocampo expressed some approval for Benito Mussolini with whom she was granted an interview in March of that year in Rome, hailing him then as a "genius" and Caesar reborn. "I have seen Italy in blossom turn its face towards him." However, she was never a convinced fascist sympathizer, and expressed disapproval of Mussolini's conservative views on gender roles and the regime's growing militarism. By the time her interview with Mussolini was published in August 1936, Italy had invaded Abyssinia and Ocampo appended a note to it declaring that any hope that the fascist regime might improve was lost and criticized those in Argentina who supported Italy's belligerence.

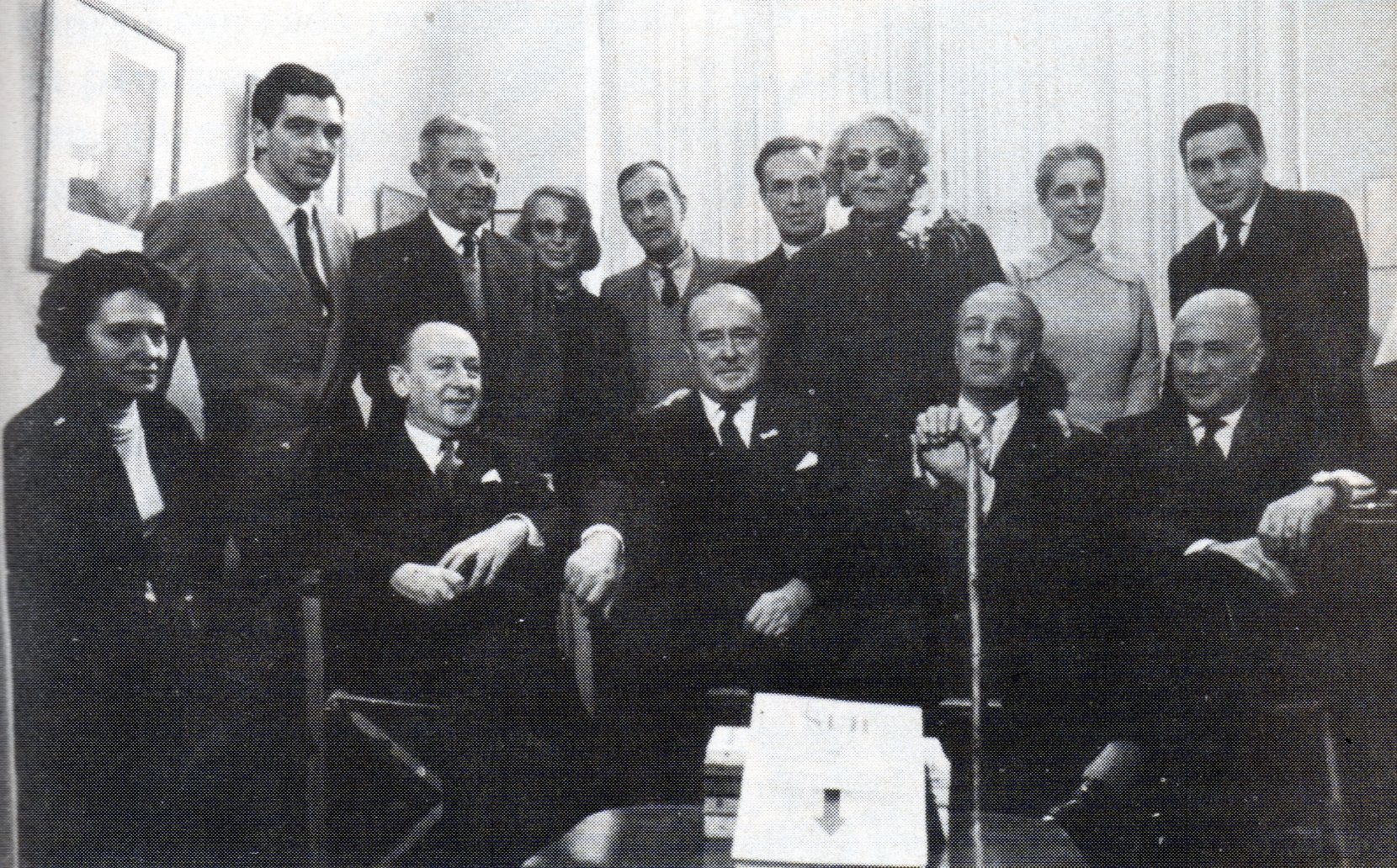
The Sur editorial team in 1961: Ocampo, in the center, between Adolfo Bioy Casares, Alicia Jurado and Jorge Luis Borges.

In 1937, Ocampo and the editors of Sur came out openly against fascism and definitively linked the journal with liberalism. During the Spanish Civil War, the magazine sided with the Republicans. She supported and edited from Argentina, in collaboration with her friend and translator Pelegrina Pastorino, the anti-Nazi magazine Les Lettres Francaises, directed by Roger Caillois; and in 1946 she was the only Argentine who attended the Nuremberg Trials. A few months before World War II, in 1939, Ocampo was appointed to the International Committee on Intellectual Cooperation of the League of Nations, but did not participate in its works. In 1953, she was briefly imprisoned for her open opposition to the government of Juan Domingo Perón.

Ocampo was made a member of the Argentine Academy of Letters in 1976. She was the first woman ever admitted to the Academy, and she formally took her seat on 23 June 1977. The "cultural dialog," initiated in 1977 by the de facto government but organized by UNESCO, was held in her home, Villa Ocampo, in San Isidro, Buenos Aires Province; she eventually donated the house to UNESCO in 1973.

At Villa Ocampo, her guests included Igor Stravinsky, André Malraux and Rabindranath Tagore, also Indira Gandhi, José Ortega y Gasset, Antoine de Saint-Exupéry, Saint-John Perse, Ernest Ansermet and Rafael Alberti. Graham Greene dedicated his 1973 novel The Honorary Consul to her, "with love, and in memory of the many happy weeks I have passed at San Isidro and Mar del Plata."

Victoria Ocampo died in Buenos Aires in 1979, and is buried in La Recoleta Cemetery in Buenos Aires.

== Literary Works ==
=== Testimonials ===
- Testimonios, 1.ª serie ("Testimonials, 1st series": 1935)
- Testimonios, 2.ª serie ("Testimonials, 2nd series": 1941)
- Testimonios, 3.ª serie ("Testimonials, 3rd series": 1950)
- Testimonios, 4.ª serie ("Testimonials, 4th series": 1950)
- Testimonios, 5.ª serie ("Testimonials, 5th series": 1954)
- Testimonios, 6.ª serie ("Testimonials, 6th series": 1962)
- Testimonios, 7.ª serie ("Testimonials, 7th series": 1967)
- Testimonios, 8.ª serie ("Testimonials, 8th series": 1971)
- Testimonios, 9.ª serie ("Testimonials, 9th series": 1975)
- Testimonios, 10.ª serie ("Testimonials, 10th series": 1998)

=== Autobiography ===
- Autobiografía I: El archipiélago ("Autobiography I: The Archipelago", 1979)
- Autobiografía II: El imperio insular ("Autobiography II: The Island Empire", 1980)
- Autobiografía III: La rama de Salzburgo ("Autobiography III: The Salzburg Branch", 1981)
- Autobiografía IV: Viraje ("Autobiography IV: Turning", 1982)
- Autobiografía V: Figuras simbólicas ("Autobiography V: Symbolic Figures", 1983)
- Autobiografía VI: Sur y Cía ("Autobiography VI: Sur y Cía", 1984)

=== Essays and Non-fictions ===
- De Francesca a Beatrice ("From Francesca to Beatrice", 1924 and 1963; with a prologue by José Ortega y Gasset)
- La laguna de los nenúfares ("The Water Lily Lagoon", 1926)
- Domingos en Hyde Park ("Sundays in Hyde Park", 1936)
- San Isidro (with a poem by Silvina Ocampo and 68 photographs by Gustavo Thorlichen, 1941)
- Le Vert Paradis (1947)
- Henry V y Laurence Olivier ("Henry V and Lawrence Olivier, 1947)
- Lawrence d'Arabia (published in French and English, 1947)
- El viajero y una de sus sombras ("The Traveler and One of His Shadows", 1951)
- Lawrence de Arabia y otros ensayos ("Lawrence of Arabia and Other Essays", 1951)
- Virginia Woolf en su diario ("Virginia Woolf in Her Diary", 1954)
- Habla el algarrobo: luz y sonido ("The Carob Tree Speaks: Light and Sound", 1959)
- Tagore en las barrancas de San Isidro ("Tagore in the San Isidro Ravines", 1961)
- Juan Sebastián Bach, El hombre ("Juan Sebastian Bach, The Man", 1964)
- La bella y sus enamorados ("The Beauty and Her Lovers", 1964)
- Diálogo con Borges ("Dialogue with Borges", 1969)
- Diálogo con Mallea ("Dialogue with Mallea", 1969)
- Páginas dispersas de Victoria Ocampo ("Scattered Pages of Victoria Ocampo", 1987)

=== Translations ===
- Caligula (play by Albert Camus, 1946)
- Gigi (novella by Colette and play by Anita Loos, 1946)
- El cuarto en que se vive (play by Graham Greene, 1953)
- Vinoba (biography by Lanza del Vasto, 1955)
- Réquiem para una reclusa (novel by William Faulkner and adapted play by Albert Camus, 1957)
- El que pierde gana (novella by Graham Greene, 1957)
- La casilla de las macetas (play by Graham Greene, 1957)
- El amante complaciente (play by Graham Greene, 1959)
- El troquel (book by T. E. Lawrence, 1959)
- Bajo el bosque de leche (play by Dylan Thomas, 1959)
- Los poseídos (novel by Fyodor Dostoevsky and adapted play by Albert Camus, 1960)
- Tallando una estatua (play by Graham Greene, 1965)
- Antología (selected writings by Jawaharlal Nehru, 1966)
- Mi vida es mi mensaje (book by Mahatma Gandhi, 1970)
- La vuelta de A.J.Raffles (play by Graham Greene, 1976)
- Oda Jubilar (poems by Paul Claudel, 1978)

== Honors ==
- Maria Moors Cabot prize
- Commander of the Order of the British Empire
- Doctor honoris causa – Harvard University, Visva-Bharati University
- Premio de Honor de la Sociedad Argentina de Escritores [Argentine Society of Writers]
- Gold Medal – Académie française

== Biopics ==
- Her life was portrayed in a film for TV in 1984, Four Faces of Victoria, directed by Oscar Barney Finn with four actresses playing the different ages of Victoria (Carola Reyna, Nacha Guevara, Julia von Grolman and China Zorrilla).
- Her attitude and political views were depicted in Monica Ottino's theater play Eva and Victoria, an imaginary confrontation between the young Eva Perón and the elderly Victoria. The play ran successfully during the eighties with Soledad Silveyra as Eva and China Zorrilla as Victoria.
