= Sara Gallardo =

Argentine author and journalist

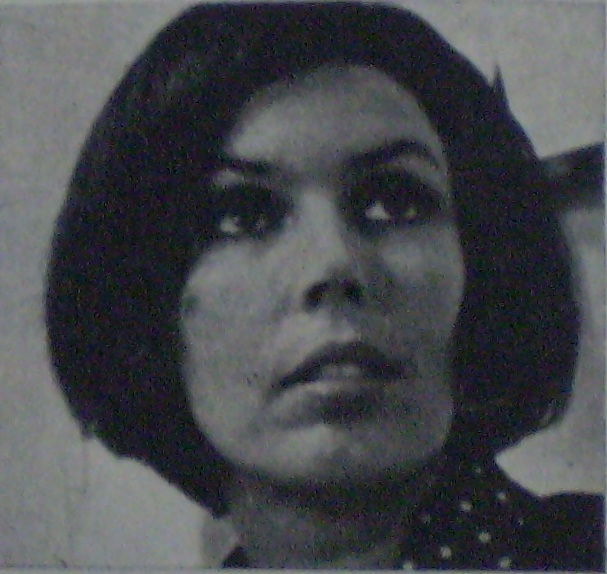
Sara Gallardo

Sara Gallardo Drago Mitre (23 December 1931 – 14 June 1988) was an influential Argentine author and journalist.

== Life ==
Gallardo was born in Buenos Aires to an upper class family with extensive agricultural property. She became an astute observer and critic of the Argentine aristocracy. She was Bartolomé Mitre's great-great-granddaughter.

She was married twice, first to Luis Pico Estrada and then to H. A. Murena. Gallardo began publishing in 1958. In addition to her numerous newspaper columns and essays, she published five novels, a collection of short stories, several children’s books, and a number of travelogues. She contributed to the magazines Primera Plana, Panorama and Confirmado among others. She is quoted as often saying, "Writing is an absurd and heroic activity."

Greatly affected by the death of her second husband in 1975, she moved with her children to La Cumbre, Córdoba Province, to a house provided by the writer Manuel Mujica Láinez. Then in 1979, she moved to Barcelona, where she wrote La Rosa en el Viento (The Rose in the Wind), her last book. She continued her travels in Switzerland and Italy, but she did not finish any more works. Upon her return to Argentina she died at age 56 of an asthma attack in Buenos Aires. She left behind notes for a planned biography of the Jewish intellectual and Carmelite nun, Edith Stein, who was killed at the Auschwitz concentration camp in 1942. The Sara Gallardo Novel Prize was created in 2021.

== Works ==
Enero ("January ")(1958) is her first novel. It details the intensely private world of an adolescent farmworker. It is written in a deliberately ambiguous way to reflect the confusion of the main character, who becomes pregnant after being raped.

El País del Humo ("Land of Smoke")(1977) is a collection of short stories and literary sketches that show a fantastical side that was more associated with her children’s books. Some of the stories can be described as science fiction.

Other works include the novels Pantalones azules (1963), Los galgos, los galgos (1968), Eisejuaz (1971), El país de los galgos (1975) and La rosa del viento (1979).

== Works in English translation ==
- Land of Smoke (trans. Jessica Sequeira). Pushkin Press, 2018.
- January (trans. Frances Riddle and Maureen Shaughnessy). Archipelago, 2023.
