= Sur (magazine) =

Former literary magazine in Argentina

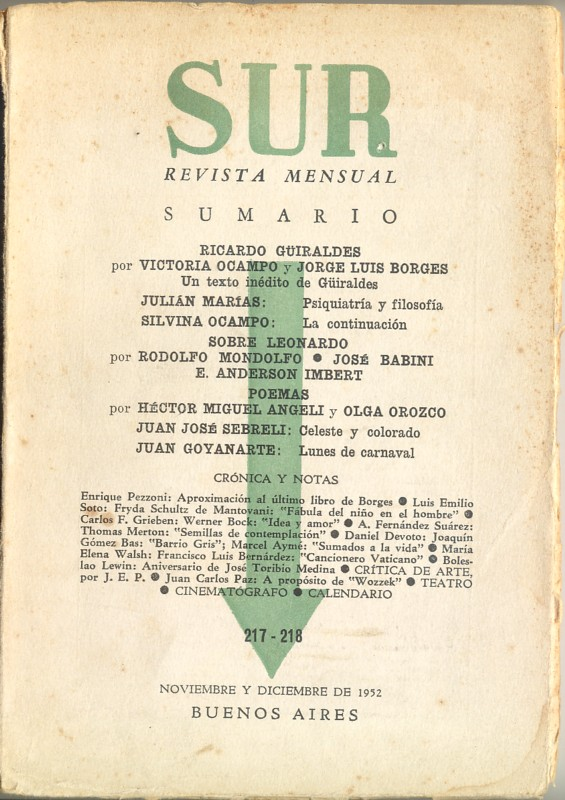
- Cover of Sur, 1952
- Categories: Literary
- Format: Magazine
- First issue: 1931
- Final issue: 1992
- Country: Argentina
- Based in: Buenos Aires
- Language: Spanish

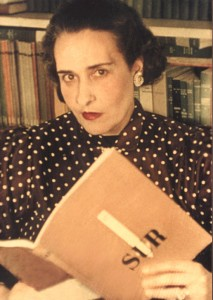
Literary critic Victoria Ocampo and a copy of her journal, SUR.

Sur was a literary magazine published in Buenos Aires between 1931 and 1992.

== History and profile ==
Sur was first published in 1931, with the assistance of a multidisciplinary team of collaborators. Its founder and main backer was Victoria Ocampo, and it was supported intellectually by the Spanish philosopher José Ortega y Gasset. Many of the earliest editions of Sur carry the colophon of Ortega's Revista de Occidente. Notable contributors and sometime editors included Jorge Luis Borges, H.A. Murena, José Bianco, Raimundo Lida, Adolfo Bioy Casares and Borges' Spanish brother-in-law Guillermo de Torre.

The final issue of the magazine, no. 371, was published in 1992, several years after Victoria's death in 1979. In the last twenty-six years of its existence, the publication of each issue became increasingly spaced out. Thus, during its peak, between 1931 and 1966, 305 issues of the magazine were published, whereas in the following twenty-six years only 67 issues were published.

== Political and philosophical stance ==
At the time, it had a clear anti-Nazi profile. Its financial problems simultaneously increased due to its large investments in Sur, with a net loss of 85,000 Argentine pesos on the 25th anniversary of the magazine.

José Bianco served as editorial secretary between 1938 and 1961, when Victoria Ocampo decided to remove him from his post following his visit to Cuba, where the Cuban Revolution had triumphed, and his participation as a juror in the Casa de las Américas Prize, to which Ocampo had not been invited. This conception of objectives opposed both the aesthetic and ideological work of Victoria Ocampo. The magazine rivalled Contorno, by Ismael and David Viñas, which positioned itself against "the establishment of the cultural oligarchy of the magazine Sur".

Sur adopted a clearly anti-Peronist stance. The Peronist critic Daniel Santoro expressed this view in 2006:

"Gauchos, rural labourers, housemaids, Buenos Aires workers and provincial morenos were [supposedly] a mass prone to excesses and to tastes not homologated, a heavy burden of deep America that threatened to invert the direction of the Sur vector, represented on the cover of the magazine, which at the time exercised cultural and good-taste commissariat. The vector in the logo of this magazine pointed south from the north, symbolically showing the accepted direction for influences and homologations. The set of political and cultural innovations brought by Peronism constituted an undesirable aesthetic programme capable of inverting the direction of the vector of influences, which would provoke a contaminating reflux toward the active waters of postwar modernity"
