= Adolfo Bioy Casares =

Argentine novelist (1914–1999)

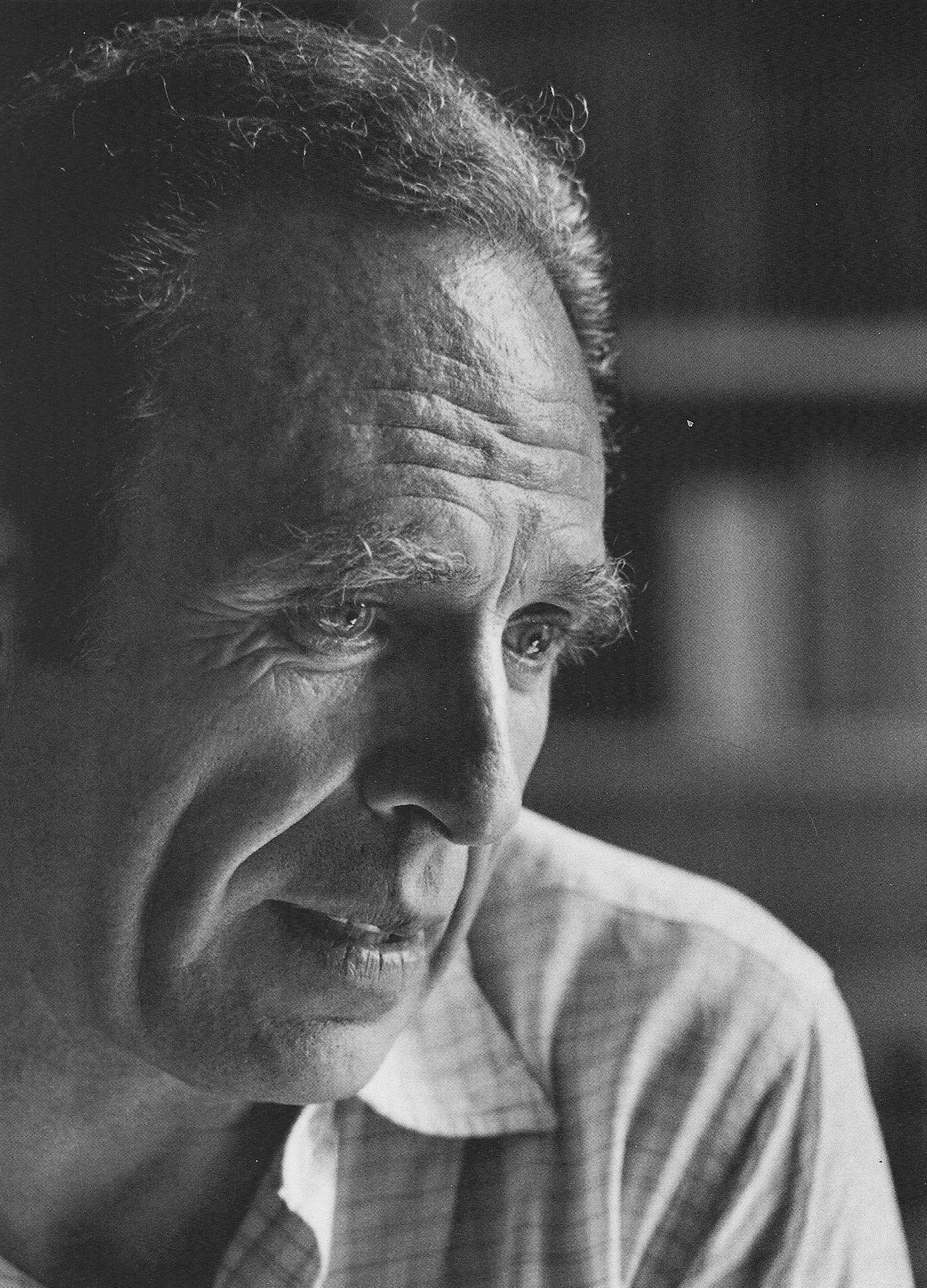
- Bioy Casares in 1968
- Born: 15 September 1914; Buenos Aires, Argentina
- Died: 8 March 1999 (aged 84); Buenos Aires, Argentina
- Resting place: La Recoleta Cemetery, Buenos Aires
- Occupations: Writer; poet; critic; librarian
- Notable work: The Invention of Morel
- Spouse: Silvina Ocampo (m. 1940; died 1993)
- Awards: Miguel de Cervantes Prize (1991)

Adolfo Bioy Casares (Spanish pronunciation: [aˈðolfo ˈβjoj kaˈsaɾes]; 15 September 1914 – 8 March 1999) was an Argentine fiction writer, journalist, diarist, and translator. He was a friend and frequent collaborator of his fellow countryman Jorge Luis Borges. He is the author of the Fantastique novel The Invention of Morel.

== Biography ==
Adolfo Bioy Casares was born on September 15, 1914, in Buenos Aires, the only child of Adolfo Bioy Domecq and Marta Ignacia Casares Lynch. He was born in Recoleta, a neighborhood of Buenos Aires traditionally inhabited by upper-class families, where he would reside the majority of his life. Due to his family's high social class, he was able to dedicate himself exclusively to literature and, at the same time, distinguish his work from the traditional literary medium of his time. He wrote his first story ("Iris y Margarita") at the age of eleven. He began his secondary education in the Instituto Libre de Segunda Enseñanza at the Universidad de Buenos Aires. Later, he started but did not end up finishing degrees in law, philosophy, and literature. Fueled by disappointment with the university atmosphere, he moved to a family ranch where, when he didn't have visitors, he devoted himself almost entirely to his study of literature. By the time he reached his late twenties, he was proficient in Spanish, English, French (which he spoke from the age of 4) and German. Between 1929 and 1937 Bioy Casares published a number of books (Prólogo, 17 disparos contra lo porvenir, Caos, La nueva tormenta, La estatua casera, Luis Greve, muerto) that he would later disdain, restricting additional publications and refusing to discuss them, labeling all his work previous to 1940 as 'horrible'.

In 1932 he met Jorge Luis Borges at Villa Ocampo, a house in San Isidro belonging to Victoria Ocampo. There, she often hosted different international figures and organized cultural celebrations, one of which brought Borges and Bioy Casares together. Bioy Casares recalled that on that particular occasion, the two writers stepped away from the rest of the guests, only to be reprimanded by Ocampo. This reproach provoked them to leave the gathering and return to the city together. The journey sealed a lifelong friendship and many influential literary collaborations. Under the pseudonyms H. Bustos Domecq and Benito Suárez Lynch, the two teamed up on a variety of projects from short stories (Seis problemas para don Isidro Parodi, Dos fantasías memorables, Un modelo para la muerte), to screenplays (Los orilleros, El paraíso de los creyentes, Invasión), and fantastic fiction (Antología de la literatura fantástica, Cuentos breves y extraordinarios). Between 1945 and 1955, they directed "El séptimo círculo" ("The Seventh Circle"), a collection of translations of popular English detective fiction, a genre that Borges greatly admired. In 2006, Borges, a biographical volume of more than 1600 pages from Bioy Casares' journals, revealed many additional details of the friendship shared by the two writers. Bioy Casares had already prepared and corrected the texts some time previously, but he never was able to publish them himself.

In 1940, he published the short novel The Invention of Morel, which marked the beginning of his literary maturity. The novel has an introduction written by Borges, in which he comments on the absence of precursors to science fiction in Spanish literature, presenting Bioy Casares as the pioneer of a new genre. The novella was very well accepted and received the Primer Premio Municipal de Literatura (First Municipal Prize of Literature) in 1941. During this same time, in collaboration with Borges and Silvina Ocampo, he published two anthologies: Antología de la literatura fantástica (1940) y Antología poética argentina (1941). In 1940, Bioy Casares married Silvina Ocampo, Victoria's sister, who was a painter as well as a writer. The relationship between the two was marked from the outset by a break with the social conventions of their time and class, from the age difference (Silvina was eleven years older) and the fact that they lived together for eight years without being married, to Bioy’s habit of openly maintaining relationships with other women. In 1954, one of Bioy Casares' mistresses gave birth in the United States to his daughter, Marta, who was subsequently adopted by his wife Silvina. Marta was killed in an automobile accident just three weeks after Silvina Ocampo's death, leaving Adolfo with two children. The estate of Silvina Ocampo and Adolfo Bioy Casares was awarded by a Buenos Aires court to yet another love child of Adolfo Bioy Casares, Fabián Bioy. Fabián Bioy died, aged 40, in Paris, France, on 11 February 2006.

Bioy won several awards, including the Gran Premio de Honor of SADE (the Argentine Society of Writers, 1975), the French Legion of Honour (1981), the Diamond Konex Award of Literature (1994) the title of Illustrious Citizen of Buenos Aires (1986), and the Miguel de Cervantes Prize (awarded to him in 1991 in Alcalá de Henares). Adolfo Bioy Casares is buried in La Recoleta Cemetery, Buenos Aires.

== Themes and style ==
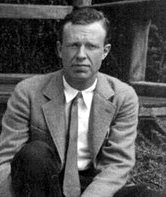
Bioy Casares in 1941.

Bioy Casares's style has been described as classical, with an initial influence from Borges, although over time he developed elements that distinguish his work. Leaving aside his early period (1929–1937), which he rejected and which critics have described as a formative stage influenced by Symbolism and Surrealism, at least two phases are usually distinguished in his work:

- Between 1940 and 1953, his works are characterised by the development of plot-driven narratives in which a fantastic event occurs and is explained at the end of the story. This stage includes the novels The Invention of Morel and Plan de evasión, as well as the short story collection La trama celeste.
- From 1954 onwards, without abandoning elements of his earlier narrative, Bioy incorporated ironic distance in the use of conventions associated with the fantastic and detective genres, and placed greater emphasis on the depiction of settings and characters, as well as on colloquial language. This period includes the novels El sueño de los héroes, Diario de la guerra del cerdo, Dormir al sol, and La aventura de un fotógrafo en La Plata, as well as most of the short stories published after Historia prodigiosa.

Recurring themes in Bioy's work include the Faustian bargain, the presence of female characters, time travel, and questions concerning the perception of reality. In contrast to definitions proposed by Roger Caillois and Tzvetan Todorov, which describe the fantastic as the intrusion of an inexplicable event into a realistic setting, in Bioy's work the fantastic is often associated with characters entering a separate or unfamiliar realm that coexists with the real world. These narrative situations are frequently linked to journeys or attempts at escape, in which characters travel to other spaces where the central events occur and then return or attempt to return to their ordinary surroundings, a structure that has been compared to Alice's Adventures in Wonderland by Lewis Carroll. He did not employ conventions associated with Gothic fiction; like Borges, his narratives often centre on a single fantastic event that is later explained. His work has also been compared to that of Julio Cortázar in relation to the portrayal of everyday life and characterisation.

Love is another recurring theme in his works, often presented within frameworks associated with Romanticism or courtly love. Female characters are frequently depicted as ambiguous figures, while male protagonists are often portrayed as strongly attached to unattainable objects of desire. The critic José Miguel Oviedo has described these protagonists as “deliberately senseless and incompetent” and has characterised Bioy Casares's works as “fantastic comedies”.

== Works ==
The best-known novel by Bioy Casares is La invención de Morel (The Invention of Morel). It is the story of a man who, evading justice, escapes to an island said to be infected with a mysterious fatal disease. Struggling to understand why everything seems to repeat, he realizes that all the people he sees there are actually recordings, made with a special machine, invented by Morel, which is able to record not only three-dimensional images, but also voices and scents, making it all indistinguishable from reality. The story mixes realism, fantasy, science fiction and terror. Borges wrote an introduction in which he called it a work of "reasoned imagination" and linked it to the work of H. G. Wells. Both Borges and Octavio Paz described the novel as "perfect". The story is held to be the inspiration for Alan Resnais's Last Year at Marienbad and an influence on the TV series Lost.

Novels and novellas

- La nueva tormenta o la vida de Juan Ruteno, 167 pp. (1935; "The New Storm or The Life of Juan Ruteno")
- La invención de Morel, 126 pp. (1940; translated into English as The Invention of Morel, 1964, ISBN 1-59017-057-1)
- El perjurio de la nieve, 64 pp. (1944; "The Snow's Perjury")
- Plan de evasión, 162 pp. (1945; translated into English as A Plan for Escape, 1975, ISBN 1-55597-107-5)
- El sueño de los héroes, 216 pp. (1954; translated into English as The Dream of Heroes, 1987, ISBN 0-7043-2634-5)
- Homenaje a Francisco Almeyra, 37 pp. (1954; "Homage to Francisco Almeyra")
- Diario de la guerra del cerdo, 207 pp. (1969; translated into English as Diary of the War of the Pig, 1972, ISBN 0-07-073742-8)
- Dormir al Sol, 229 pp. (1973; translated into English as Asleep in the Sun, 1978, ISBN 0-89255-030-9)
- La aventura de un fotógrafo en La Plata, 223 pp. (1985; translated into English as The Adventures of a Photographer in La Plata, 1989, ISBN 0-7475-0798-8)
- Un campeón desparejo, 110 pp. (1993; "An Uneven Champion")

Short story collections

- 17 disparos contra el porvenir, 173 pp. (1933; "17 Shots Against the Future")
- Caos, 283 pp. (1934, "Chaos")
- Luis Greve, muerto, 157 pp. (1937; "Luis Greve, Deceased")
- La trama celeste, 246 pp. (1948; "The Celestial Plot")
- Las vísperas de Fausto, 15 pp. (1949; "Faust's Eve")
- Historia prodigiosa, 151 pp. (1956; "A Remarkable History")
- El lado de la sombra, 192 pp. (1962; "The Shady Side")
- El gran serafín, 190 pp. (1967; "The Great Seraph")
- El héroe de las mujeres, 191 pp. (1978; "The Hero of Women")
- Historias desaforadas, 231 pp. (1986; "Colossal Stories")
- Una muñeca rusa, 179 pp. (1991; translated into English as A Russian Doll and Other Stories, 1992, ISBN 0-8112-1211-4)

Generally, these Spanish-language collections have not been systematically translated into English. English language collections include:

- Selected Stories, 176 pp. (1994, ISBN 0-8112-1275-0)

Essays

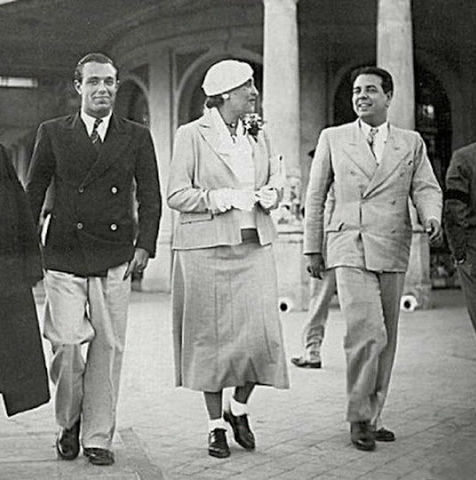
Bioy Casares with Victoria Ocampo and Jorge Luis Borges, en Mar del Plata, imagen del fotógrafo Enrico Miagro

- La otra aventura, 153 pp. (1968, "The Other Adventure")
- Memoria sobre la pampa y los gauchos, 57 pp. (1970, "Memoir on the Pampas and the Gauchos")

Miscellanies (mixed collections of stories, poems, essays, reflections, aphorisms, etc.)

- Prólogo, 127 pp. (1929; "Prologue")
- La estatua casera, 51 pp. (1936; "The Household Statue")
- Guirnalda con amores, 200 pp. (1959; "Garland with Loves")

Dictionary of Argentinean slang

- Breve diccionario del argentino exquisito, 161 pp. (1971; "Brief Dictionary of Affected Argentineans")

Letters

- En viaje (1967), 260 pp. (1996; "Travelling in 1967"; letters to Silvina Ocampo). Edited by Daniel Martino.

Diaries

- Descanso de caminantes. Diarios íntimos, 507 pp. (2001; "Rest for Travellers and Intimate Diaries"; a selection from his Journals). Edited by Daniel Martino.

Works written in collaboration with Jorge Luis Borges

- La leche cuajada de La Martona (1935; La Martona's curdled milk - Advertising brochure)
- Seis problemas para don Isidro Parodi (1942; translated into English as Six Problems for Don Isidro Parodi, 1981, ISBN 0-525-48035-8)
- Dos fantasías memorables (1946; "Two Memorable Fantasies")
- Un modelo para la muerte (1946; "A Model for Death")
- Cuentos breves y extraordinarios (1955; "Short and Amazing Stories")
- Crónicas de Bustos Domecq (1967; translated into English as Chronicles of Bustos Domecq, 1976, ISBN 0-525-47548-6)
- Libro del cielo y del infierno, (1960; "The Book of Heaven and Hell")
- Nuevos cuentos de Bustos Domecq (1977; "New Stories by Bustos Domecq")

Dos fantasías memorables and Un modelo para la muerte were originally published in private printings of only 300 copies. The first commercial printings were published in 1970.

Works written in collaboration with Silvina Ocampo

- Los que aman, odian (Those Who Love, Hate, 1946)

Works written in collaboration with Daniel Martino

- Borges (2006).

Screenplays written in collaboration with Jorge Luis Borges

- Los orilleros (1955, The Hoodlums)
- El paraíso de los creyentes (1955, The Paradise of the Believers)
- Invasión (1969, Invasion)
- The Others (1974)
