= Richard Beggs =

American sound designer

- Born: January 8, 1942 (age 83); San Francisco, California, United States
- Occupation: Sound designer
- Years active: 1979–present

Richard Beggs (born January 8, 1942) is an American sound designer who has worked on more than 70 films since 1979. He won an Academy Award for Best Sound for the film Apocalypse Now. a TEC Award for Outstanding Creative Achievement in Film Sound, and has received seven Golden Reel Award sound nominations. He has designed sound for Sofia Coppola's films The Virgin Suicides, Lost In Translation, Marie Antoinette, Somewhere, The Bling Ring and The Beguiled. His other sound design credits include Harry Potter and the Prisoner of Azkaban, The Chronicles of Narnia: the Lion, the Witch and the Wardrobe; Children of Men, Adaptation, The Godfather Part III, Palo Alto, Bugsy, Rain Man, and Ghostbusters.

Richard has taught film sound at the California College of the Arts, is an associate fellow of Berkeley College at Yale University, and sat on the board of directors of the San Francisco Arts Education Project (1986–2013).

== Selected filmography ==
- Apocalypse Now (1979)
- The Outsiders (1983)
- Rumble Fish (1983)
- Repo Man (1984)
- Ghostbusters (1984)
- The Cotton Club (1984)
- Walker (1987)
- Rain Man (1988)
- Cry-Baby (1990)
- Avalon (1990)
- The Godfather Part III (1990)
- Bugsy (1991)
- Toys (1992)
- Strange Days (1995)
- Three Businessmen (1998)
- The Virgin Suicides (1998)
- Lost In Translation (2003)
- Harry Potter and the Prisoner of Azkaban (2004)
- The Chronicles of Narnia: The Lion, the Witch and the Wardrobe (2004)
- Marie Antoinette (2006)
- Children of Men (2006)
- Searchers 2.0 (2007)
- The Bling Ring (2013)
- Palo Alto (2013)
- The Beguiled (2017)
- On The Rocks (2020)
- Mad God (2021)
