= Dead Souls (disambiguation) =

Dead Souls is a novel by the Russian author Nikolai Gogol.

Dead Souls may also refer to:

== Film and television ==
- Dead Souls (1909 film), a Russian short comedy film
- Dead Souls (1960 film), a Soviet film based on a theatrical production of Gogol's novel, directed by Leonid Trauberg
- Dead Souls (miniseries), a 1984 Soviet television miniseries adaptation of Gogol's novel, directed by Mikhail Shveytser
- Dead Souls (2012 film), an American horror film directed by Colin Theys
- Dead Souls (2018 film), a Chinese documentary film directed by Wang Bing
- Dead Souls (2025 film), an American Western film, loosely based on Gogol's novel, directed by Alex Cox
- "Dead Souls", an episode of the TV series Rebus, based on the Ian Rankin book

== Other uses ==
- Dead Souls (opera), a 1976 Russian opera based on Gogol's novel, by Rodion Shchedrin
- "Dead Souls" (song), Joy Division, 1980
- Dead Souls (Rankin novel), a 1999 Ian Rankin novel
- Dead Souls, a 2017 novel by Angela Marsons
- Dead Souls, a 2021 novel by Sam Riviere
- Yakuza: Dead Souls, a 2011 video game
