= Dan Wool =

American composer and sound designer

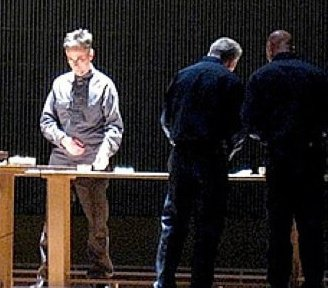
- Dan Wool performing in "Longplayer" 2010

Background information
- Genres: Film Score, Sound Design
- Occupations: Composer, audio engineer, music producer, sound designer, theme park audio media designer
- Formerly of: Pray for Rain
- Website: PrayForRain.com

Dan Wool is an American composer and sound designer based in San Francisco. He is known for his work across feature films, television, themed entertainment, dance, and experimental installations. Wool has composed music for over 45 feature films and numerous television projects, and was a longtime member of the soundtrack group Pray for Rain.

== Career ==
=== Film and television ===
Wool began his film scoring career Sid and Nancy (1986), directed by Alex Cox. He continued collaborating with Cox on nine films, including Straight to Hell (1987), Death and the Compass (1996), and Tombstone-Rashomon (2017).

He was a principal member of Pray for Rain, a San Francisco-based music collective that specialized in film and television soundtracks.

Wool has composed music for network television films and episodic series for ABC, CBS, FOX, NBC, and HBO.

==== Collaboration with Phil Tippett ====
From 2010 to 2021, Wool collaborated with visual effects artist and filmmaker Phil Tippett, composing the score for Tippett’s stop-motion experimental film Mad God (2022). The film was released in 2021, and its soundtrack was distributed by Waxwork Records in 2022.

In 2023, Wool was nominated for an Annie Award for Outstanding Achievement for Music in a Feature Production for his work on Mad God.

Wool also composed the score for OUT THERE, a 2018 experimental short film by Tippett and Lucy Raven that was screened at the Museum of Modern Art (MoMA) in New York City.

==== Themed Entertainment ====
Wool has provided sound design, original music, and on-site mixing for several immersive theme park rides and attractions. Notable clients include Tippett Studio, Sunac Group, and Wanda Group.

His work includes the "Fly Chongqing" and "Fly Sichuan" dome attractions in China, created in partnership with Tippett Studio.

==== Dance, Theatre, and Installations ====
Wool has composed and designed sound for several dance companies and choreographers, including:

- AXIS Dance Company
- Liss Fain Dance (seven immersive, multi-channel installations)
- RAWdance
- Sonsherée Giles
- Alice Sheppard
- Amy Seiwert’s Imagery (Marc Brew’s Sketch Series)
- Disability Dance Works
- Ballet de la Compasión

In October 2010, Wool participated in Jem Finer's 1000-year-long composition Longplayer, performed live at YBCA and sponsored by the Long Now Foundation.

He composed a sound installation for the A+D Museum in Los Angeles titled “Windshield Perspective” (May–July 2013).

From 2015 to 2018, Wool composed music for the U.S. Synchronized Swimming Team.

==== Music Production ====
As a producer and engineer, Wool has collaborated with:

- Bernie Worrell (Parliament-Funkadelic)
- Philip Chevron and James Fearnley (The Pogues)
- Debbie Harry (Blondie)
- Bay Area musicians including All My Pretty Ones, Beth Custer, Enrique, Essence, Indianna Hale, The Mermen, Kally Price, and Todd Stadtman

== Awards and recognition ==
- Annie Awards:
  - Nominated – Outstanding Achievement for Music in a Feature Production for Mad God (2022)
- Isadora Duncan Dance Awards (Izzies):
  - Nominated – AXIS Dance Company (2013)
  - Nominated – Liss Fain Dance
- Blessey Award (Bay Area Dance Watch):
  - Best Dance Soundtrack (2014)

== Filmography ==
(feature film composer credits except as indicated)

- Dead Souls (2025)
- Territory: Immersive VR (2024) (VR Experience)
- Humanzee (2024) (Short Film)
- Eventos En El Campo (2023) (Short Film)
- Phil Tippett's Mad God (2022)
- Fly Sichuan (2020) score composition for Fly Ride (theme park ride)
- Fly Chongqing (2020) score composition for Fly Ride (theme park ride)
- Inclinations (2019) (Short Film)
- Phil Tippett's Mad God Part 3 (2018) (Short Film)
- OUT THERE (2018) (Short Film)
- Tombstone Rashomon (2017)
- Dream of Anhui (2016) score composition for Fly Ride (theme park ride)
- Phil Tippett's Mad God Part 2 (2015) (Short Film)
- Racing to Zero (2014) (Documentary)
- Phil Tippett's Mad God Part 1 (2014) (Short Film)
- Hog's Tooth (2014) (Short Film)
- The Inheritance (2014) (Short Film)
- The Mayor (2013) (Short Documentary)
- The Caretaker (2012) (Short Documentary)
- Sin Pais (2010) (TV) (Short Documentary)
- Immigration Tango (2010)
- Repo Chick (2010)
- 5 Westerns (2008) (TV) (Short Documentary Series)
- Dispatches from Nicaragua (2008) (TV) Walker DVD Element
- Searchers 2.0 (2007)
- Journeyman (2006)
- Missing Scenes (2006) Producer, Music and Sound Design for Repo Man Anniversary Edition DVD Element
- Repo Code (2006) Music for Repo Man Anniversary Edition DVD Element
- Harry Zen Stanton (2006) Music for Repo Man Anniversary Edition DVD Element
- Death and the Compass (2005) Commentary for UK DVD
- Dalai Lama: Discourse on the Heart Sutra (2004) (DVD)
- Mike Hama - Private Detective: Mike Hama Must Die! (2002) (TV)
- Never Trust a Serial Killer (2002)
- The Wednesday Woman (2000) (TV)
- A Hard Look (2000) (TV) (Documentary)
- Way Past Cool (2000) (TV) Score Mixer
- Late Last Night (1999) (TV)
- Kurosawa: The Last Emperor (1999) (Documentary)
- Three Businessmen (1998)
- The Almost Perfect Bank Robbery (1998) (TV)
- Nightmare in Big Sky Country (1998) (TV)
- Since You've Been Gone (1998)
- Standoff (1998)
- Perfect Body (1997) (TV)
- Any Mother's Son (1997) (TV)
- Perversions of Science (1997) TV Series
- The Three Lives of Karen (1997) (TV)
- Pretty Poison (1996) (TV)
- Sweet Dreams (1996) (TV)
- Death and the Compass (1996) (TV)... a.k.a. Muerte y la Brújula, La (Mexico)
- The Winner (1996) (Japanese directors-cut only)
- A Boy Called Hate (1996)
- Her Last Chance (1996) (TV)
- She Fought Alone (1995) (TV) ... a.k.a. Scared by Love
- My Dubious Sex Drive (1995)
- White Mile (1994) (TV)
- Car 54, Where Are You? (1994)
- Floundering (1994)
- Love, Cheat & Steal (1993) (TV)
- Key West (1993) TV Series (13 episodes)
- Roadside Prophets (1992)
- Death and the Compass (1992) (TV) for UK broadcast
- The Linguini Incident (1991) (restaurant source music)
- Zandalee (1991)
- No Secrets (1991)
- Trust Me (1989)
- Tales from the Crypt (1989) TV Series (episode "The Bribe")
- Straight to Hell (1987)
- Sid and Nancy (1986)

== Sound design credits ==
- Sage (2026) (Feature Film) 5.1 channel mix
- Dead Souls (2026) (Feature Film) 5.1 channel mix
- You're Doing Great (2025) (Short Film) 5.1 channel mix
- Jurassic World: The Experience (2025) (Theme Park Installation) 18.1 channel mix
- Humanzee (2024) (Short Film) 5.1 channel mix
- Sage (2024) (Short Film) 2 channel mix
- Walking In The Age Of Uncertainty (2023) (Short Film) 5.1 channel mix
- Eventos En El Campo (2023) (Short Film) 5.1 channel mix
- Fly Sichuan (2020) ("Fly Ride") 20.1 channels. Mixed on-site Tianfu, China Produced by Tippett Studio
- Fly Chongqing (2020) ("Fly Ride") 20.1 channels. Mixed on-site Chengdu, China Produced by Tippett Studio
- Inclinations (2019) (Short Film) 2 channel mix
- OUT THERE (2018) (Short Film) 5.1 channel mix
- Dream of Anhui (2016) ("Fly Ride") 20.1 channels. Mixed on-site Hefei, China Produced by Tippett Studio
- The Hack (2011) (Short Film) 2 channel mix
- 5 Westerns (2008) (TV) (Short 5-part Documentary Series) 2 channel mix
- Repo Code (2006) Repo Man Anniversary Edition DVD Element. 2 channel mix
- Harry Zen Stanton (2006) for Repo Man Anniversary Edition DVD Element. 2 channel mix

== Performing arts and sound installation credits ==
- Here. Take It (2022) Commissioned score composition and sound design for Liss Fain Dance. Presented in 8.1 ch sound at Z Space (SF). Choreographer Liss Fain
- OUT THERE (2017-2019) Sound-design composition and mix for on-going experimental film by Lucy Raven and Phil Tippett. Preliminary screening at EMPAC (Albany, New York). Premiere screening at MOMA (NY)
- Where Good Souls Fear (2017) Commissioned score composition for Disability Dance Works. Choreographer Alice Sheppard
- Tacit Consent (dance score) (2016) Commissioned score and sound-design composition for Liss Fain Dance. Presented in 20.1 ch sound at YBCA (SF). Choreographer Liss Fain Co-presentation with Yerba Buena Center for the Arts
- Tacit Consent (installation) (2016) Visual and sound installation at YBCA (SF) in collaboration with set-designer, Matthew Antaky and sound-installation and projection-designer Frédéric O. Boulay Co-presentation with Yerba Buena Center for the Arts
- Under An Untouchable Sky (2015) Commissioned score composition for Alice Sheppard. Choreographer Alice Sheppard
- A Space Divided (2015) Commissioned score composition, sound and music supervisor for Liss Fain Dance. Presented in 8.1 ch sound at Z Space (SF). Choreographer Liss Fain
- The Imperfect is Our Paradise (2014) Commissioned score composition for Liss Fain Dance. Choreographer Liss Fain
- After The Light (2014) Commissioned score composition for Liss Fain Dance. Presented in 8.1 ch sound at Z Space (SF). Choreographer Liss Fain
- Awkward Beauty (2013) Commissioned score composition for Amy Seiwert's Imagery. Choreographer Marc Brew
- Windshield Perspective (2013) Commissioned score and sound installation for The Architecture and Design Museum (A+D Museum), Los Angeles. Presented in 8.1 ch sound. Curator Greg Goldin
- The Water is Clear and Still (2012/13) Commissioned score composition for Liss Fain Dance. Presented in 10.1 ch sound at Z Space (SF). Choreographer Liss Fain
- Two by 24: Love on Loop (2012) Commissioned score composition for RAWdance. Choreographers Wendy Rein and Ryan T. Smith
- Full of Words (2011) Commissioned score composition for AXIS Dance Company. Choreographer Marc Brew
- Fantasia Mexicana (2011) Sound design and composition for dance-program for The Tea Dancers/Ballet de la Compasión.
- The True & False are One (2010) Commissioned score composition for Liss Fain Dance. Choreographer Liss Fain
- Longplayer (2010) Performer in an excerpt of Longplayer. Composer Jem Finer
- Speak of Familiar Things (2010) Commissioned score composition for Liss Fain Dance. Choreographer Liss Fain
- Afternoon of a Fawn (2010) Sound-design for dance performance by Lisa Bufano and Sonsherée Giles. Choreographer Sonsherée Giles.
- Profound/Refound (2008) Sound-design installation accompanying art exhibition by sculptor and painter Ben Smith
