= Alex Cox =

English film director, screenwriter, and actor (born 1954)

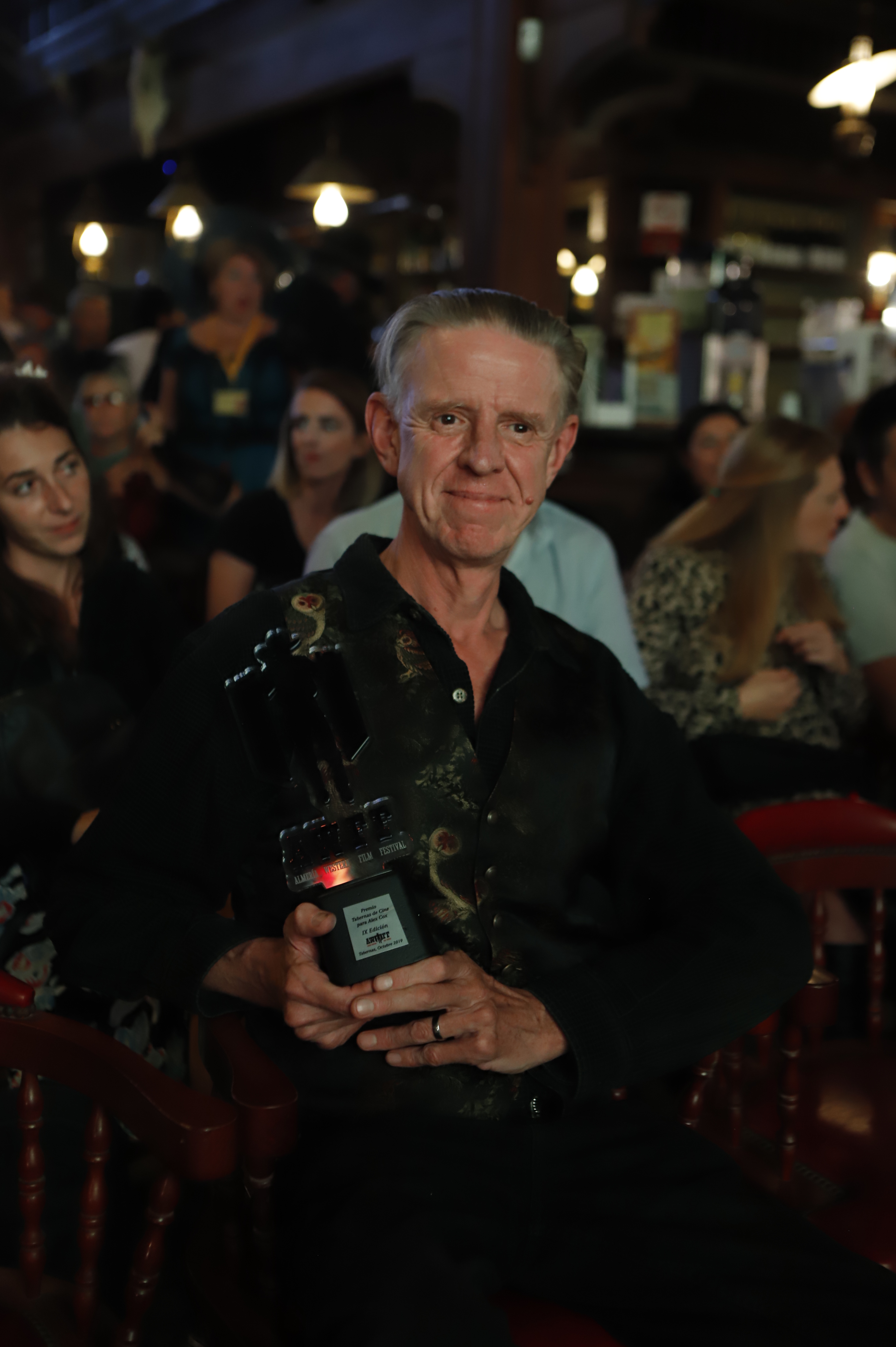
- Cox in 2019
- Born: Alexander B. H. Cox; 15 December 1954 (age 71); Bebington, Merseyside, England
- Education: University of Bristol: University of California, Los Angeles
- Occupations: Director; screenwriter; actor; author; broadcaster
- Years active: 1980–present
- Notable work: Repo Man: Sid and Nancy
- Spouse: Tod Davies

Alexander B. H. Cox (born 15 December 1954) is an English film director, screenwriter, actor, non-fiction author and broadcaster. Cox experienced success early in his career with Repo Man (1984) and Sid and Nancy (1986). Since the release and commercial failure of Walker (1987), his career has moved towards independent films, including Highway Patrolman (1991) and Three Businessmen (1998), and microbudget features such as Searchers 2.0 (2007), Repo Chick (2009), and Dead Souls (2025).

Cox has taught screenwriting and film production at the University of Colorado, Boulder and has written numerous educational books on film and television.

== Early life ==
Cox was born in Bebington, Merseyside, England in 1954 and attended Wirral Grammar School for Boys. He began a law degree at Worcester College, Oxford, but later transferred to the University of Bristol, where he majored in film studies. Cox secured a Fulbright Scholarship, allowing him to study at the University of California, Los Angeles, United States, where he graduated from the School of Theater, Film and Television with an MFA.

== Film career ==
=== Study and independent ===
At UCLA Cox produced his first film, Edge City (also known as Sleep Is for Sissies), a 40-minute surreal short about an artist struggling against society. After graduation, Cox formed Edge City Productions with two friends with the intention of producing low-budget feature films. He wrote a screenplay for Repo Man, which he hoped to produce for a budget of $70,000, and began seeking funding.

=== Hollywood and major studio period (1978–1987) ===
Michael Nesmith agreed to produce Repo Man, and convinced Universal Studios to back the project with a budget of over a million dollars. During the course of the film's production, the studio's management changed, and the new management had far less faith in the project. The initial cinema release was limited to Chicago, followed by Los Angeles, and was short-lived.

After the success of the soundtrack album (notable for featuring many popular LA punk bands), there was enough interest in the film to earn a re-release in a single cinema in New York City, but only after becoming available on video and cable. Nevertheless, it ran for 18 months, and eventually earned $4,000,000.

Continuing his fascination with punk music, Cox's next film was an independent feature shot in London and Los Angeles, following the career and death of bassist Sid Vicious and his girlfriend Nancy Spungen, initially titled Love Kills and later renamed Sid and Nancy. It was met warmly by critics and fans, though heavily criticised by some, including Pistols' frontman John Lydon, for its inaccuracies. The production of this film also sparked a relationship with Joe Strummer of the Clash, who would continue to collaborate with the director on his next two films.

Cox had long been interested in Nicaragua and the Sandinistas (both Repo Man and Edge City made references to Nicaragua and/or Latin American revolution), and visited in 1984. The following year, he hoped to shoot a concert film there featuring the Clash, the Pogues and Elvis Costello. When he could not get backing, he decided instead to write a film that they would all act in. The film became Straight to Hell. Collaborating with Dick Rude (who also co-starred beside Strummer, Sy Richardson and Courtney Love), he imagined the film as a spoof of the Spaghetti Western genre, filmed in Almería, Spain, where many classic Italian westerns were shot. Straight to Hell was widely panned critically, but successful in Japan and retains a cult following. On 1 June 2012, Cox wrote an article in The New York Times about his long-standing interest in spaghetti westerns.

Continuing his interest in Nicaragua, Cox took on a more overtly political project, with the intention of filming it there. He asked Rudy Wurlitzer to pen the screenplay, which followed the life of William Walker, set against a backdrop of anachronisms that drew parallels between the story and modern American intervention in the area. The $6,000,000 production was backed by Universal, but the completed film, released in 1987, was too political and too violent for the studio's tastes, and the film went without promotion. When Walker failed to perform at the box office, it ended the director's involvement with Hollywood studios, and led to a period of several years in which Cox would not direct a single film. Despite this, Cox and some critics maintain that it is his best film.

=== Mexican period (1988–1996) ===
In 1988, The Writers Guild of America West barred Cox from any future membership because he had worked on scripts during the writers' strike. Effectively blacklisted, Alex Cox struggled to find feature work. He finally got financial backing for a feature from investors in Japan, where his films had been successful on video. Cox had scouted locations in Mexico during the pre-production of Walker and decided he wanted to shoot a film there, with a local cast and crew, in Spanish. Producer Lorenzo O'Brien penned the script. Inspired by the style of Mexican directors including Arturo Ripstein, he shot most of the film in plano secuencia; long, continuous takes shot with a hand-held camera. El Patrullero was completed and released in 1991, but struggled to find its way into cinemas.

Shortly after this, Cox was invited to adapt a Jorge Luis Borges story of his choice for the BBC. He chose Death and the Compass. Despite being a British production and an English language film, he convinced his producers to let him shoot in Mexico City. This film, like his previous Mexican production, made extensive use of long-takes. The completed 55-minute film aired on the BBC in 1992.

Cox had hoped to expand this into a feature-length film, but the BBC was uninterested. Japanese investors gave him $100,000 to expand the film in 1993, but the production ran over-budget, allowing no funds for post-production. To secure funds, Cox directed a "work for hire" project called The Winner. The film was edited extensively without Cox's knowledge, and he tried to have his name removed from the credits as a result but was denied, but the money was enough for Cox to fund the completion of Death and the Compass. The finished, 82-minute feature received a limited cinema release in the US, where the TV version had not aired, in 1996.

Damián Alcázar, who had a small role in El Patrullero, went on to collaborate on many occasions with Mexican director Luis Estrada, in two of whose films, Herod's Law (1999) and A Wonderful World (2006), Cox appears. However, in A Wonderful World, Cox's role is reduced to a cameo at the end of the film.

=== Liverpool period (1997–2006) ===
In 1996, producer Stephen Nemeth employed Alex Cox to write and direct an adaptation of Hunter S. Thompson's Fear and Loathing in Las Vegas. After creative disagreements with the producer and Thompson, he was sacked from the project, and his script rewritten when Terry Gilliam took over the film. (Cox later sued successfully for a writing credit, as it was ruled that there were enough similarities between the drafts to suggest that Gilliam's was derivative of Cox's. Gilliam countered that the screenplays were based on the source book and similarities between them were a consequence of this.)

In 1997, Alex Cox made a deal with Dutch producer Wim Kayzer to produce another dual TV/feature production, Three Businessmen. Initially, Cox had hoped to shoot in Mexico but later decided to set his story in Liverpool, Rotterdam, Tokyo and Almería. The story follows businessmen in Liverpool who leave their hotel in search of food and slowly drift further from their starting point, all the while believing they are still in Liverpool. The film was completed for a small budget of $250,000. Following this, Cox moved back to Liverpool and became interested in creating films there.

Cox had long been interested in the Jacobean play, The Revenger's Tragedy, and upon moving back to Britain, decided to pursue adapting it to a film. Collaborating with fellow Liverpudlian screenwriter Frank Cottrell Boyce, the story was recast in the near future, following an unseen war. This adaptation, titled Revengers Tragedy, consisted primarily of the original play's dialogue, with some additional bits written in a more modern tone. The film is also notable for its soundtrack, composed by Chumbawamba.

Following this, Cox directed a short film set in Liverpool for the BBC titled I'm a Juvenile Delinquent – Jail Me! (2004). The 30-minute film satirised reality television as well as the high volume of petty crime in Liverpool which, according to Cox, is largely recreational.

=== Microfeature period (2007–present) ===
In 2006, Alex Cox tried to get funding for a series of eight very low budget features set in Liverpool and produced by locals. The project was not completed, but the director grew interested in pursuing the idea of a film made for less than £100,000. He had originally hoped to shoot Repo Man on a comparable budget, and hoped that the lower overhead would mean greater creative freedom.

Searchers 2.0, named after but not based on The Searchers, became Cox's first film for which he has sole writing credit since Repo Man, and marked his return to the comedy genre. A road movie and a revenge story, it tells of two actors, loosely based on and played by Del Zamora and Ed Pansullo, who travel from Los Angeles to a desert film screening in Monument Valley in the hopes of avenging abuse inflicted on them by a cruel screenwriter, Fritz Frobisher (Sy Richardson). It was scored by longtime collaborator Dan Wool a.k.a. Pray for Rain (Sid & Nancy, Straight to Hell, Death & the Compass, The Winner, Three Businessmen, Repo Chick among others). Although the film was unable to achieve a cinema release in America or Europe, Cox claimed the experience of making a film with a smaller crew and less restrictions was energising. It is available on DVD in Japan, and was released in October 2010 in North America.

Alex Cox had attempted to get a Repo Man sequel, titled Waldo's Hawaiian Holiday, produced in the mid-'90s, but the project fell apart, with the script adapted into a graphic novel of the same name. For his next micro-feature, he wrote a fresh attempt at a Repo follow-up, although it contained no recurring characters, so as to preserve Universal's rights to the original. Repo Chick was filmed entirely against a green screen, with backgrounds of digital composites, live action shots, and miniatures matted in afterwards, to produce an artificial look. It premiered at the Venice Film Festival on 9 September 2009.

As of July 2012, Cox was teaching film production and screenwriting at the University of Colorado at Boulder.

In 2013 Cox directed Bill, the Galactic Hero, developed from a science fiction book by Harry Harrison. It was funded by a successful Kickstarter funding campaign, raising $114,957 of the original $100,000 goal. The film was to be made, created and acted by his film students in monochrome with supervision from professional film makers who would be giving their time on the film for free.

Cox's 2013 book The President and the Provocateur examines events in the lives of John F. Kennedy and Lee Harvey Oswald leading up to Kennedy's assassination, with reference to the various conspiracy theories.

In 2017 Cox directed another crowdfunded film, Tombstone Rashomon, which tells the tale of the Gunfight at the O.K. Corral from multiple perspectives in the style of Akira Kurosawa's 1950 film Rashomon.

In September 2019, Cox started the podcast Conversations with Cox and Kjølseth with his friend and colleague Pablo Kjølseth. In October 2022, Cox announced the end of the podcast, citing its small audience and the comparative success of podcasts by Joe Dante, Quentin Tarantino and Cox's one-time collaborator Roger Deakins.

In June 2024 Cox began crowdfunding a film adaptation of Nikolai Gogol's novel Dead Souls, which he says will be his last film.

== Moviedrome ==
In May 1988 Cox began presenting the long-running and influential BBC series Moviedrome. The weekly strand was a showcase for cult films. Though most of the films shown were chosen by series creator and producer Nick Jones, each film was introduced by Cox. By the time he left the show in September 1994, Cox had introduced 141 films. Various film directors have cited Moviedrome as an influence, including Ben Wheatley and Edgar Wright. The series was later presented by film director and critic Mark Cousins.

== Influences and style ==
Cox has cited Luis Buñuel and Akira Kurosawa as influences, as well as the Western film directors Sergio Leone, Sergio Corbucci, Sam Peckinpah, John Ford and Giulio Questi. Cox also wrote a book on the history of the genre called 10,000 Ways to Die. While he once directed films for Universal Pictures, such as Repo Man and Walker, since the late 1980s, he has found himself on a self-described blacklist, and turned to producing independent films. Cox is an atheist and is decidedly left-wing in his political views. Many of his films have an explicit anti-capitalist theme or message.

Cox is a fan of the Japanese Godzilla films and appeared in a 1998 BBC documentary highlighting the series. He also narrated the documentary Bringing Godzilla Down to Size and wrote the Godzilla in Time comics for Dark Horse. He tried to direct an American Godzilla film at one point, but unsuccessfully submitted his outline to TriStar Pictures.

== Personal life ==
As of 2011, Cox resided in Colestin, Oregon, United States, with his wife, writer Todelina Babish Davies.

== List of works ==
=== Feature films ===
| Year | Title | Director | Writer | Producer | Notes |
|---|---|---|---|---|---|
| 1980 | Edge City | Yes | Yes | No | Short film |
| 1984 | Repo Man | Yes | Yes | No | |
| 1986 | Sid & Nancy | Yes | Yes | No | |
| 1987 | Straight to Hell | Yes | Yes | No | |
| 1987 | Walker | Yes | No | No | Also editor |
| 1991 | El Patrullero (Highway Patrolman) | Yes | No | No | |
| 1992 | Death and the Compass | Yes | Yes | No | |
| 1996 | The Winner | Yes | No | No | |
| 1998 | Fear and Loathing in Las Vegas | No | Yes | No | Replaced as director by Terry Gilliam |
| 1998 | Three Businessmen | Yes | No | No | |
| 2002 | Revengers Tragedy | Yes | No | No | |
| 2007 | Searchers 2.0 | Yes | Yes | No | Also editor |
| 2009 | Repo Chick | Yes | Yes | Yes | Also editor |
| 2014 | Bill, the Galactic Hero | Yes | Yes | No | |
| 2017 | Tombstone Rashomon | Yes | Yes | Yes | |
| 2018 | 27: El club de los malditos | No | Yes | No | |
| 2023 | Eventos En El Campo | Yes | Yes | No | Short film |
| 2025 | Dead Souls | Yes | Yes | No | |

=== Documentaries directed ===
| Year | Title |
|---|---|
| 1999 | Kurosawa: The Last Emperor |
| 2000 | Emmanuelle: A Hard Look |
| 2012 | Scene Missing |

=== Television directed ===
| Year | Title | Notes |
|---|---|---|
| 2002 | The Private Detective Mike | Episode: "Mie Hama Must Die!"; also writer |
| 2004 | I'm a Juvenile Delinquent – Jail Me! | Mockumentary |

=== Books ===
| Year | Title | ISBN | Notes |
|---|---|---|---|
| 2008 | 10,000 Ways to Die: A Director's Take on the Spaghetti Western | 184-2433040 | |
| 2008 | X Films: True Confessions of a Radical Filmmaker | 978-0857730398 | |
| 2008 | Waldo's Hawaiian Holiday | 097-7562824 | Graphic novel; writer only |
| 2010 | Three Dead Princes | 978-1935259060 | Picture book; illustrator only |
| 2013 | The President and the Provocateur: The Parallel Lives of JFK and Lee Harvey Oswald | 978-1842439425 | |
| 2016 | Alex Cox's Introduction to Film: A Director's Perspective | 978-1843447474 | |
| 2017 | I Am (Not) A Number: Decoding The Prisoner | 978-0857301772 | |

=== Acting roles and documentary appearances ===
| Year | Title | Role | Notes |
|---|---|---|---|
| 1980 | Edge City | Roy Rawlings | Short film |
| 1984 | Scarred | Porno Stud | |
| 1984 | Repo Man | Car Wash Attendant | Uncredited |
| 1986 | Sid & Nancy | Man Sitting in Mr. Head's Room | Uncredited |
| 1987 | Straight to Hell | A Thug in the Amazulu Band | Uncredited |
| 1988–1994 | Moviedrome | Himself (presenter) | 81 episodes |
| 1990 | Catchfire | D.H. Lawrence | Uncredited |
| 1991 | El Patrullero | Gringo No. 2 | |
| 1992 | Death and the Compass | Commander Borges | |
| 1994 | Floundering | Photograher | |
| 1994 | Deadbeat | English Teacher | |
| 1994 | The Queen of the Night | Klaus Eder | |
| 1996 | The Winner | Gaston | |
| 1997 | Perdita Durango | Doyle | |
| 1998 | Three Businessmen | Frank King | |
| 1998 | Godzilla, King of the Monsters | Himself | Television documentary |
| 1999 | Herod's Law | Gringo | |
| 2000 | Todo el poder | Corrupt Cop | |
| 2000 | In His Life: The John Lennon Story | Bruno Koschmider | Television film |
| 2002 | Revengers Tragedy | Duke's Driver | |
| 2002 | The Complaint | Dr. Fanshaw | Short film |
| 2003 | Dominator | Bishop | Voice |
| 2005 | Rosario Tijeras | Donovan | |
| 2006 | Un mundo maravilloso | Masters of Ceremonies | |
| 2007 | Bringing Godzilla Down to Size | Narrator | Documentary |
| 2007 | Searchers 2.0 | Entrepreneur | |
| 2008 | The Oxford Murders | Kalman | |
| 2009 | Repo Chick | Professor | |
| 2014 | Doc of the Dead | Himself | Documentary |
| 2015 | Moon Studios | The Colonel | Short film |
| 2015 | The Return of the Dragon Sword | Thug #1 | Voice; short film |
| 2017 | The Curse of the Dragon Sword | Blacksmith | Also executive producer |
| 2017 | Tombstone Rashomon | Hamlet performer | |
| 2018–2022 | An Unknown Enemy | Winston Scott | 11 episodes |
| 2021 | Mad God | Last Man | |
| 2022 | Quantum Cowboys | Father John Kino | |
| 2023 | Eventos En El Campo | Man | Short film |
| 2024 | Illuminatus! | Narrator | Voice; short film |
