= Catchfire =

1990 film by Dennis Hopper

- Theatrical release poster
- Directed by: Dennis Hopper (Note: Credited as Alan Smithee.)
- Screenplay by: Rachel Kronstadt Mann; Ann Louise Bardach; Uncredited: Alex Cox; Tod Davies
- Story by: Rachel Kronstadt Mann
- Produced by: Dick Clark; Dan Paulson
- Starring: Dennis Hopper; Jodie Foster; Dean Stockwell; Vincent Price; John Turturro; Fred Ward
- Cinematography: Edward Lachman
- Edited by: David Rawlins
- Music by: Curt Sobel; Michel Colombier
- Production companies: Vestron Pictures; Precision Films; Mack-Taylor Productions; Dick Clark Cinema
- Distributed by: Vestron Pictures
- Release date: April 3, 1990
- Running time: 99 minutes (theatrical cut); 116 minutes (director's cut)
- Country: United States
- Language: English
- Budget: $10 million
- Box office: $5 million

Catchfire is a 1990 American romantic action-thriller film directed by Dennis Hopper and starring Hopper, Jodie Foster, Dean Stockwell, Vincent Price, John Turturro, and Fred Ward, with cameo appearances by several notable actors, including Charlie Sheen, Joe Pesci, Catherine Keener, and Bob Dylan. The film is about an artist on the run from the mob (Foster), who is pursued by a relentless hitman (Hopper) who begins to fall in love with her.

The film was disowned by Hopper before its release, after it was edited without his involvement by the producers. He is therefore credited under the pseudonym Alan Smithee. Released by Vestron Pictures on April 3, 1990, Catchfire underperformed at the box office and received overwhelmingly negative reviews by film critics.

In 1992, an extended director's cut of the film was released under the new title Backtrack. It runs 18 minutes longer than the theatrical version and restores Hopper's directorial credit. In additional to cable TV airings it has been released on VHS, DVD and Blu-ray.

== Plot ==
Conceptual artist Anne Benton creates electronic pieces that flash evocative statements, and her work has begun to attract major media attention. One night, while driving home, Anne suffers a blowout on a road near some isolated industrial factories. While looking for help, she witnesses a mafia hit supervised by Leo Carelli, who kills another mobster and his bodyguard. Leo spots Anne, but she manages to escape and goes to the police.

Two of the mobsters, Greek and Pinella, go to Anne's house to silence her but end up killing her boyfriend, Bob. FBI agent Pauling, who has been after Carelli for some time, offers Anne a place in the Witness Protection Program. However, when she sees another mobster, Carelli's lawyer John Luponi, at the police station, she disguises herself with another woman's wig and raincoat and flees. Meanwhile, mob boss Lino Avoca, Carelli's boss, summons top-of-the-line hitman Milo to silence Anne. Milo purchases one of Anne's artworks and ransacks her house, discovering intimate Polaroids taken of her.

Months pass, and Anne has severed all ties with her past, re-establishing herself in Seattle as an advertising copywriter. Milo, relentless in his pursuit, recognizes the tagline of a lipstick ad as one of Anne's catchphrases and tracks her down. Pauling and the police also track Anne down, but she manages to once again elude all the men pursuing her. Milo eventually tracks Anne to New Mexico, where he is followed by Pinella, who is tracking Milo's whereabouts for Carelli. Milo quickly kills Pinella, corners Anne, and offers her a deal: he'll let her live if she does anything and everything he asks. Milo's interest in Anne goes beyond professional, but not exactly as she thinks; he doesn't want her to be his sex slave, although sex is part of the equation.

Obsessed, Milo has fallen in love with Anne, and he has no idea how to cope with the unfamiliar emotion. Surprisingly, after a rocky start, Anne realizes that she has also fallen for him. At the same time, failing to kill Anne as hired, Milo has marked himself for death. Anne and Milo flee together to an isolated farm that Milo owns. Avoca's men track them there, and they narrowly escape.

Anne and Milo realize that to be free, they must return and confront their pursuers. They concoct a plan, leaving Avoca, Carelli, and all of their men dead. Anne and Milo escape together to a new life, presumably in France.

=== Alternative ending ===
Dennis Hopper's director's cut, entitled Backtrack, features an extended alternate ending:

Milo and Anne return together to the refinery by the side of the road where Anne witnessed the mob hit that made her run. The refinery, in fact, belongs to Mr. Avoca and bears its name. Milo contacts Leo Carelli, tells him that he has killed Anne, and wants to "make peace" with Carelli, asking to meet in the Avoca factory. Pauling, who has a wiretap on Carelli's house, spies on the conversation and travels there with the police.

Avoca and his men wait near the factory, while Pauling and the police wait in another sector of the same zone. Carelli, his henchman Greek, and Luponi go inside and find Milo waiting for them. When Luponi tries to shoot Milo in the back, Anne shoots from far away and wounds him with a scoped rifle. She reveals to be clothed in a special fire proximity suit, as well as Milo. They seem to let Carelli and Greek get away to run and trip on a wire connected to explosives. The refinery is blown to pieces, and Carelli, Greek, and Luponi die while Anne and Milo escape. Avoca sends his men after Anne and Milo, but the police surround and arrest them. Nevertheless, Avoca escapes in a helicopter, and Pauling goes after Anne and Milo in his car but misses them as they move in the sewer system nearby.

Milo and Anne move away and start a new life, presumably in France. The end credits show one of Anne's electronic signs spelling THE END in several fonts.

== Cast ==
- Jodie Foster as Anne Benton
- Dennis Hopper as Milo
- Dean Stockwell as John Luponi
- John Turturro as Pinella
- Fred Ward as Pauling
- Vincent Price as Mr. Avoca
- Joe Pesci as Leo Carelli (uncredited)
- Julie Adams as Martha
- Tony Sirico as Greek
- Sy Richardson as Captain Walker
- Frank Gio as Frankie
- Helena Kallianiotes as Grace Carelli
- Grand L. Bush as Bank Teller
- Katherine LaNasa as The Waitress
- Anthony Pena as Taos Sheriff
- Michael Yama as Technician
- John Zenda as Trucker

=== Cameo appearances ===
- Charlie Sheen as Bob
- Burke Byrnes as Federal Agent
- Catherine Keener as Trucker's Girl
- Tod Davies as Hit Woman
- Bob Dylan as Charles Arnoldi (uncredited)
- Alex Cox as D.H. Lawrence (uncredited)
- Toni Basil (uncredited)

== Production ==
=== Writing ===
The original screenplay was written by Rachel Kronstadt Mann, then re-written by Ann Louise Bardach, who was hired by Hopper and producer Steven Reuther. During the 1988 Writers Guild of America strike, Hopper hired Alex Cox to do another polish on the script while the film was shooting. Tod Davies also performed uncredited rewrites.

Anne Benton's text-based art in the film is the work of conceptual artist Jenny Holzer.

=== Filming ===
The production was marred with difficulties between Foster and Hopper. The differences began on the first day of filming of Foster in the shower scene. Foster, dissatisfied with the scene, yelled "cut", which angered Hopper, who told her never to do that again. Later, according to Hopper in an interview with Charlie Rose, Foster warned Meryl Streep by phone several times to avoid Hopper, who was very keen on working with her. Streep never returned his calls. Hopper stated:

"It blew what I thought at the time was a go project a few years ago. Cause Meryl suddenly said no. She [Foster] thought that I had this AA mentality where I was really just doing this sober drunk or something, and I just couldn't possibly understand women. But she didn't say that, confront me with that on the set, so I didn't know where that was coming from, 'cause I thought I treated her rather well." ^{-Dennis Hopper, March 28, 1996 appearance on The Charlie Rose Show.}

=== Post-production ===
In a 1990 interview, Hopper referred to the film's post-production as "...a vortex of a Vestron cesspool. It was a victim of bankruptcy and greed." Hopper, who was used to having final cut privilege, was removed from editing by the producers. Approximately a half-hour of footage was cut, and most of Michel Colombier's original music was replaced with new score by Curt Sobel. Hopper disowned the theatrical cut and was took the "Alan Smithee" pseudonym for his directing credit.

== Critical reception ==
The film was not well received by critics. Variety wrote: "Somewhere in here is a dark, sassy picture, but the final product is more like a jigsaw with half the pieces. Apart from Foster who's strong, shrewd and sexy, thesping is vaudeville all the way. Pesci rants and raves, Stockwell shows a nice line in a low-key comedy, Ward looks like he hasn't been shown the whole script, and Hopper has a go at Humphrey Bogart in shades". Greg Wroblewski wrote: "It's a mediocre film, with often illogical, even incomprehensible plot twists and poor character development."

== Director's cut ==
Hopper released a director's cut of the film in the United States on cable television titled Backtrack, which runs 18 minutes longer than the theatrical version and restores Colombier's original score. This version has since been released on VHS, DVD and Blu-ray. He referred to the restored version as "one of my finer films."
