= I'm a Juvenile Delinquent – Jail Me! =

Film directed by Alex Cox

I'm a Juvenile Delinquent – Jail Me! is a BBC film for young people, directed by Alex Cox, written by Tod Davies, produced by Sol Papadopoulos and starring Carla Henry. It was shot in Liverpool in 2004 and its soundtrack was written by Pete Wylie. It was nominated in the "Best Educational Drama" category at the British Academy Film Awards (BAFTAs) in 2004.

== Synopsis ==
The film parodies reality TV shows such as I'm a Celebrity...Get Me Out of Here!, being presented as a similar reality show in which a group of juvenile delinquents are given "tasks" of crime and vandalism to perform, as chosen by viewers.

== Production ==
The film is best known for launching the career of Andrea Duggan, Hollywood costume designer.
