= Repo Chick =

- DVD cover
- Directed by: Alex Cox
- Written by: Alex Cox
- Produced by: Chris Papavasiliou; Tod Davies; Ken Meyer
- Starring: Jaclyn Jonet; Miguel Sandoval; Del Zamora; Chloe Webb; Xander Berkeley; Rosanna Arquette; Angela Sarafyan
- Cinematography: Steven Fierberg
- Music by: Dan Wool; Kid Carpet
- Release dates: 8 September 2009 (Venice); 9 September 2009 (United States)
- Running time: 88 minutes
- Country: United States
- Language: English
- Budget: $200,000

Repo Chick is a 2009 American comedy film written and directed by Alex Cox. Like Cox's first feature, Repo Man, it centers on the repossession trade and a mysterious vehicle with a large reward. It is the second of Cox's "microfeatures", produced for a very low budget and given very little theatrical distribution. It was released on DVD in North America and the United Kingdom in February 2011.

== Plot ==
Pixxi De La Chasse is a spoiled, self-centered celebutante heiress of a wealthy Los Angeles family. After countless tabloid scandals, her parents disinherit her, and tell her she must find a real job in order to regain her part of the fortune. When her car is repossessed, a member of her entourage suggests she get a job as a repossessor, a booming industry among widespread credit collapse.

She is immediately successful at her new job, to such an extent that the veterans are threatened. Gainfully employed, she tries to reconcile with her family, only to find they have given her part of the inheritance to charity. Out of revenge, she asks co-worker Lola to hack their credit and leave her family destitute and homeless.

Pixxi notices a wanted poster promising a $1,000,000 reward for the successful return of an antique train. She finds the train as it is departing with several prominent figures on a supposed tour of a proposed energy pipeline. Pixxi talks her way onto the train, and the hosts, intrigued by Pixxi's celebrity stature, oblige.

As the tour proceeds, the hosts reveal themselves to be eco-terrorists. The caboose of the train contains six nuclear bombs left over from the Cold War, which the terrorists threaten to use to destroy Los Angeles unless the sport of golf is banned nationwide and all members of the federal government become vegan. Pixxi, at various points, manages to escape for long enough to place calls to her co-workers and members of the military. She is asked to put the train on another track, but cannot from within the train. She calls her co-worker Arizona Gray and asks him to reach the switch. He arrives just in time, but collapses before throwing the lever.

Pixxi's call to Gray is picked up by Rogers, her father's manservant. Rogers, now homeless with Pixxi's family, insists that Pixxi must agree to reconcile with her family before throwing the switch. He does, and the train is redirected to Arizona, where Predator drones are deployed to take the train out. The drones crash as the train enters the tunnel, as Pixxi dupes her captor into freeing her, allowing her to free the other hostages and bring the train to safety.

== Cast ==
- Jaclyn Jonet as Pixxi De La Chasse
- Miguel Sandoval as Arizona Gray
- Del Zamora as Lorenzo
- Alex Feldman as Marco
- Chloe Webb as Sister Duncan
- Danny Arroyo as 666
- Bennet Guillory as Rogers
- Rosanna Arquette as Lola
- Frances Bay as Grandma De La Chasse
- Xander Berkeley as Aldrich De La Chasse
- Karen Black as Aunt De La Chasse
- Jenna Zablocki as Eggi
- Zahn McClarnon as Savage Dave
- Cy Carter as Lawyer
- Robert Beltran as Aguas
- Olivia Barash as Railroad Employee

== Production ==
Originally written with a $7,000,000 budget in mind, Alex Cox, after successfully completing Searchers 2.0 for $180,000, elected to produce the movie as a "microfeature", below the minimum line governed by the Screen Actors Guild of $200,000. To accomplish this, he shot almost the entire movie in front of a green screen on a sound stage in 10 days. Backgrounds, consisting largely of miniatures and composites, were added in afterward to give the film a deliberately artificial look, suggesting the entire movie is set in a scale model world.

== Connection to Repo Man ==
Although billed as a "non-sequel", Repo Chick has invariably been associated with Cox's earlier cult classic Repo Man. Cox shares the rights to Repo Man with Universal Pictures, such that neither can produce a true sequel without the other's consent. Because of this, all connections are indirect, without referencing any specific characters from the previous film.

Several actors from Repo Man, including Olivia Barash, Zander Schloss, Jennifer Balgobin, Del Zamora, Tom Finnegan, Eddie Velez, Biff Yeager, and Miguel Sandoval return in Repo Chick, but in completely different roles. Both films feature plots centering on the repossession of a vehicle with a high reward, which is suspected to contain weapons of mass destruction, and both are set primarily in and around Los Angeles. Beyond this, there is very little connection.

Despite this, Universal Pictures threatened Cox with a cease and desist order, and released the film Repo Men, which Cox suggested was deliberately retitled to exploit interest in his film and confuse audiences into believing it was a sequel. No litigation has followed on either side.

== Reception ==
Review blog Quiet Earth rated the film 7 out of 10. The Village Voice also reviewed the film, holding a mixed opinion.
