= Revengers Tragedy =

2002 film by Alex Cox

- Directed by: Alex Cox
- Written by: Frank Cottrell Boyce
- Produced by: Margaret Matheson; Tod Davies
- Starring: Christopher Eccleston; Eddie Izzard; Derek Jacobi; Andrew Schofield; Tony Booth
- Cinematography: Len Gowing
- Edited by: Ray Fowlis
- Music by: Chumbawamba
- Distributed by: World Cinema Ltd.
- Release date: 6 August 2002 (Locarno Film Festival)
- Running time: 106 minutes
- Country: England
- Language: English

Revengers Tragedy is a 2002 film adaptation of the 1606 play The Revenger's Tragedy (attributed to Thomas Middleton in the credits, following the scholarly consensus). It was directed by Alex Cox and adapted for the screen by Cox's fellow Liverpudlian, Frank Cottrell-Boyce. The film stars Christopher Eccleston as the revenge-obsessed Vindici, with Derek Jacobi as the evil Duke, Eddie Izzard as his lecherous son Lussurioso, Diana Quick as the Duchess, Andrew Schofield as Vindice's brother Carlo (a version of the play's Hippolito), Carla Henry as his virtuous sister Castiza, and Marc Warren and Justin Salinger as the Duchess's sons Supervacuo and Ambitioso.

== Synopsis ==
The original play is set in a depraved Italian court, but Cottrell Boyce's screenplay relocates it to a futuristic version of Liverpool in the year 2011, following the aftermath of a natural disaster which has destroyed the southern half of Great Britain. The city is a dystopia in which society is collapsing and where vendettas and the crude exercise of power are the norm. Jacobi's Duke is the most powerful crime lord in the city. Cottrell Boyce's script rearranges the play heavily and mixes the original Jacobean language with modern language.

== Cast ==
- Christopher Eccleston as Vindici
- Kevin Knapman as Firework
- Michael Ryan as 1st Thug
- Andrew Schofield as Carlo
- Paul Reynolds as Junior
- Justin Salinger as Ambitioso
- Eddie Izzard as Lussurioso
- Marc Warren as Supervacuo
- Carla Henry as Castiza
- Shaun Mason as Hippolito
- Sophie Dahl as Imogen
- Anthony Booth as Antonio
- Derek Jacobi as Duke
- Diana Quick as Duchess
- Alex Cox as Duke's Driver
- Margi Clarke as Hannah
- Tony Maudsley as Executioner
- Charles De'Ath as Sordido

== Production ==
Revengers Tragedy was shot and edited in Liverpool with an almost entirely local crew, including cinematographer Len Gowing, costumer Monica Aslanian, makeup designer Lesley Brennan and assistant director Kim Ryan. Cox's usual production designer, Cecilia Montiel prepared a visual strategy which was executed by her co-designer Remi Vaughan-Richards. The producers were Margaret Matheson (who executive produced Cox's Sid and Nancy for Zenith) and Tod Davies (Cox's wife, who also wrote and produced Cox's Three Businessmen).

The soundtrack of the same name was written and performed by Chumbawamba. In 2003, it was released by the band on their independent record label, MUTT.

The film was originally intended to end with a montage of the World Trade Center exploding as Vindici whispered "revenge", but this was removed at the request of the film's stakeholders.

== Reception ==
The BBC's Jamie Russell gave the film 3/5 stars, stating "it exaggerates the play's confused identities, deliberate miscommunications, and sarcastic asides into an overblown exercise in outright camp." The review further states that the film's messages are "ultimately let down by the film's rough edges", and contains "moments that are painfully amateurish", stating that the film "ultimately annoys as much as it exhilarates." Variety's Deborah Young described the film as "ambitious, sometimes exhilarating but ultimately not very new attempt to unleash the power of great literature past by punking it up." The Time Out Film Guide commented: "The stylistic intention, presumably, was old meets new with a Luhrmann-like flourish, but the modest resources on display result in a look somewhere between threadbare Jarman and school play. One struggles to be impressed."
