= Waldo's Hawaiian Holiday =

2008 graphic novel written by Alex Cox

- Date: March 2008
- Page count: 176 pages
- Publisher: Gestalt Comics

Creative team
- Writers: Alex Cox; Christopher Bones (adaptation)
- Artists: Christopher Bones
- Colourists: Justin Randall
- ISBN: 0977562824

Waldo's Hawaiian Holiday is a graphic novel from Gestalt Publishing written by Alex Cox and illustrated by Christopher Bones and Justin Randall. It is a sequel to the 1984 cult film Repo Man.

== Publication history ==
The sequel to Repo Man was planned as far back as 1997 and filming started but was never completed. The making of it is featured in the documentary A Texas Tale of Treason. Cox afterward made another semi-sequel called Repo Chick but the original sequel remained as a script on Cox's website. Christopher Bones stumbled across it while working on another project and contacted Cox about adapting it, which Cox agreed to.

== Plot ==
Otto, now using the name Waldo, has returned to Earth from Mars after ten years. Now nearly 30, he adjusts to life in mid-1990s, and gets a boring job as a telemarketer. When Waldo receives a call offering a free Hawaiian vacation, he makes taking the trip his goal, but his efforts are repeatedly thwarted by bureaucracy. It is eventually revealed that these difficulties are intentional, and that Los Angeles is actually an experimental self-maintaining prison constructed by Martians to contain humans. Waldo returns to his job and never goes on vacation.
