= Dead Souls (2025 film) =

2025 film by Alex Cox

- Theatrical release poster by Jamie Jamieson
- Directed by: Alex Cox
- Screenplay by: Alex Cox; Gianni Garko
- Based on: Dead Souls by Nikolai Gogol
- Produced by: Merritt Crocker; Guillermo de Oliveira
- Starring: Alex Cox; Zander Schloss; Dick Rude; Amariah Dionne; Brendan Guy Murphy; Sarah Vista; Shayn Herndon; Levee Duplay; Karen E. Wright; Eric Schumacher; Ted Falagan; Maria Robles; Javier Arnal; Geoff Marslett; Melanie Browning; Jeffrey Baden; Merritt Crocker; Ed Pansull; Jesse Lee Pacheco; Edward Tudor-Pole
- Cinematography: Ignacio Aguilar; Chance Falkner
- Edited by: Merritt Crocker
- Music by: Dan Wool
- Production companies: Exterminating Angel; Zapruder Pictures
- Distributed by: Kino Lorber
- Release dates: October 9, 2025 (Almería Western Film Festival); June 20, 2026 (United States)
- Running time: 89 minutes
- Countries: United States; Spain
- Languages: English; Spanish

Dead Souls is a 2025 Western film directed by and starring Alex Cox and co-written with actor Gianni Garko. It is loosely based on Nikolai Gogol's novel Dead Souls, changing the setting from early 19th-century Russia to the United States in 1890.

== Plot ==
A man (Alex Cox) arrives in a small Arizona town in search of the names of dead Mexican laborers.

== Cast ==
- Alex Cox as Strindler
- Zander Schloss as Borracho
- Dick Rude as Doctor Stanton
- Amariah Dionne as Rose Chandler
- Brendan Guy Murphy as Sheriff Purdy
- Sarah Vista as The Widower
- Shayn Herndon as The Kid
- Levee Duplay as Prosecutor Samuel S. Vistov
- Karen E. Wright as Rebecca Stanton
- Eric Schumacher as Mayor Avery Senator
- Ted Falagan as Oso
- Maria Robles as Nuira
- Javier Arnal as Juarez Official
- Geoff Marslett as Chandler
- Melanie Browning as Colonel X
- Jeffrey Baden as Colonel Y
- Merritt Crocker as Crocker
- Ed Pansull as the Undertaker
- Jesse Lee Pacheco as Johnny Behan
- Edward Tudor-Pole as Dad

== Production ==
In 2024, Cox announced he was seeking funding for his possible final feature film on Kickstarter. Based on Nikolai Gogol's Russian novel Dead Souls, a satire of 19th-century Russian bureaucracy, Cox saw the structure and themes of the story lending themselves to be reimagined as an American Western. Cox considered entitling the film Dead Mexicans or Government Work before settling on using the novel's title.

Filming began in late 2024 in the Almería in Spain, at the same location many Italian Westerns were filmed, including Sergio Leone's For a Few Dollars More (1965). Production wrapped in Arizona in November, 2024.

Phil Tippett signed on to animate a flashback sequence using stop-motion animation.

== Release ==
Dead Souls premiered at the 2025 Almería Western Film Festival. The film was given a touring theatrical release by Kino Lorber in the United States starting on June 20, 2026.

== Reception ==
Reviewing the film for The Guardian, Peter Bradshaw wrote positively of Dead Souls as a "love letter to the spaghetti west of the movies" and complimented its satire of "Trumpian politics". Similarly, Jenny Paola Ortega Castillo, writing for Film International, called the film's anti-Right-wing statements an "ideal closing to [Cox's] career, a final step in a vibrant, career-long engagement with the Western" and complimented the reimagining of Gogol's novel.
