= Tombstone Rashomon =

- Theatrical release poster
- Directed by: Alex Cox
- Written by: Alex Cox
- Produced by: Max Arvelaiz; Ward Churchill; Alex Cox; Merritt Crocker; Kyle Curry; Travis Mills; John M. Oswald; Fernando Sulichin; Robert S. Wilson
- Starring: Adam Newberry; Eric Schumacher
- Cinematography: Alana Murphy
- Edited by: Merritt Crocker
- Music by: Dan Wool
- Production company: Tombstone Limited
- Release date: April 8, 2017
- Running time: 83 minutes
- Country: United States
- Language: English

Tombstone Rashomon is a 2017 Western film directed by Alex Cox and starring Adam Newberry and Eric Schumacher. It tells the story of the Gunfight at the O.K. Corral in Tombstone, Arizona Territory, from multiple differing perspectives in the style of Akira Kurosawa's 1950 film Rashomon.

== Plot synopsis ==
A film crew travels back in time to film the Gunfight at the O.K. Corral. They arrive after the gunfight, however, and can only interview those involved. They interview Wyatt Earp, Doc Holliday, Kate, Ike Clanton, Colonel Roderick Hafford, and Johnny Behan, each of whom has a different take on the events.

== Cast ==
- Adam Newberry as Wyatt Earp
- Jesse Lee Pacheco as Johnny Behan
- Christine Doidge as Kate
- Eric Schumacher as Doc Holliday
- Benny Lee Kennedy as Ike Clanton
- Richard Anderson as Hafford
- Jason Graham as Virgil Earp
- Shayn Herndon as Morgan Earp
- Michele Bauer as Allie Earp
- Haydn Winston as Frank McLaury
- Bradford Trojan as Tom McLaury
- James Miller as Billy Clanton
- Callie Hutchison as Mattie Earp
- Rogelio Camarillo as Billy Claiborne
- Brenda Jean Foley as Mollie Fly
- Frank Gonzalez as Ned Boyle
- Wade Everett as William B. Murray
- Pablo Kjolseth as C.S. Fly
- Geoff Marslett as Charles Shibell
- Merritt Crocker as Bill Leonard
- Carlos Abdalla as Albert Behan
- Oz as William Baron (barber)
- Frank Baden as Keefe
- Jeremy Hamley as Sheriff's Deputy
- Susan Sebanc as Interviewer
- William Long as Bartender
- Khameiah Williamson as Butcher
- Steve Burton as Blacksmith
- Charles Scanlon as Ed Schieffelin

== Production ==
As with his previous film Bill, the Galactic Hero (2014), Alex Cox used crowdfunding to finance the production of the film. This time he used an Indiegogo campaign.

In an interview with IndieWire, Cox stated, "I was thinking it would be a conventional western, but Rudy (Wurlitzer) wants to give it a science fiction angle — from the perspective of time-traveling women historians from the future. They’ll time-travel back in time to film at the OK Corral, but they get the day wrong and they miss it by a day, so they have to interview the survivors." Wurlitzer was involved in early stages, but not credited as a writer on the final film, the screenplay is solely credited to Cox.

In an interview with The Huffington Post, Cox stated that he had originally planned to film in Boulder, Colorado, but then decided to shoot in Tucson instead.

Filming took place at the Old Tucson Studios west of Tucson. In an interview with Tucson Weekly, Cox stated that the producers of Snowden matched the funds already accumulated, helping Cox to complete the film.

== Release ==
The film screened as a work in progress at the Ashland Independent Film Festival at 6:40 p.m. on Saturday, April 8, 2017, at the Cinedelphia Film Festival at 7:00 p.m. on April 15, 2017, and at the Loft Film Fest on May 27, 2017.
