= Biff Yeager =

American actor

- Born: October 24, 1942 (age 84); Frazier Park, California, U.S.
- Occupations: Actor, producer
- Years active: 1957–present

Biff Yeager (born October 24, 1942) is an American actor. He has appeared in a number of TV series including Star Trek: The Next Generation, Seinfeld, and Gilmore Girls.

== Career ==
Yeager has appeared in such TV shows as Star Trek: The Next Generation, The Wonder Years, and Scrubs. He played Chief Engineer Argyle in Star Trek: The Next Generation, the gym teacher in Seinfeld, maintenance worker George in Parks and Recreation, Bob in Bunheads and Tom, the local contractor in Gilmore Girls.

His film credits include Black Samurai (1977), Repo Man (1984), Prime Risk (1985), Girls Just Want to Have Fun (1985), Savage Dawn (1985), Sid and Nancy (1986), Straight to Hell (1987), Walker (1987), Banzai Runner (1987), Edward Scissorhands (1990), Another You (1991), Headless Body in Topless Bar (1995), Best Men (1997), Paris (2003) and White Oleander (2002).

== Filmography ==
=== Film ===
Year	Title	Role	Notes
1957	Jet Pilot	Bit Part	Uncredited
1974	Dynamite Brothers	Moustached Thug	
1974	So Evil, My Sister	Bill	
1975	Jessi's Girls	Link	
1976	Black Samurai	D.R.A.G.O.N. Agent Pines	
1977	Uncle Tom's Cabin	Legree's Man	
1982	Frances	Motorcycle Cop	
1983	Stryker	Biff	Uncredited
1984	Repo Man	Agent B	
1985	Girls Just Want to Have Fun	Mr. Malene	
1985	Prime Risk	Policeman #1	
1985	Echo Park	Jailer	
1985	Jagged Edge	Reporter	
1985	School Spirit	Cop in Station	
1985	Savage Dawn	Biff	
1986	The Ladies Club	Bailiff	
1986	Sid and Nancy	Detective	
1987	Banzai Runner	Graham	
1987	Straight to Hell	Frank McMahon	
1987	Walker	Rudler	
1988	Dead Man Walking	Security Man	
1988	Hollow Gate	Andy	
1989	Night Life	Paramedic #1	
1989	Ghost Writer	Officer #1	
1990	The Gumshoe Kid	Captain Billings	
1990	Another 48 Hrs.	County Sheriff	
1990	American Born	Ryan	
1990	Edward Scissorhands	George	
1991	F/X2	Police Sergeant	
1991	Another You	Benziger	
1992	Roadside Prophets	Bartender	
1992	Batman Returns	Security #2	
1993	Ed and His Dead Mother	Cop #2	
1994	Floundering	Dad	
1994	Dirty Money	Tommy	
1994	The Glass Shield	Investigating Officer	
1994	Ed Wood	Rude Boss	
1995	Headless Body in Topless Bar	Joe	
1996	The Winner	Philip's Father	
1997	Best Men	Mayor Boar	
2001	Boys Klub	Coach Baxter	
2002	White Oleander	Judge	
2003	Paris	Detective Bill Baker	
2004	Em & Me	Deputy Roth	
2008	Winged Creatures	Neighbor #2	
2009	Repo Chick	Golf Course Guard	
2010	Hesher	Counselor	Uncredited
2010	Mob Rules	Strip Club Patron	
2017	Suburbicon	Mr. Karger	

=== Television ===
Year	Title	Role	Notes
1977	Nowhere to Hide	Co-Pilot	Television film
1977	The Girl Called Hatter Fox	Cabbie	Television film
1978	The President's Mistress	Cabbie	Television film
1982	Two of a Kind	Gas Attendant	Television film
1982–1987	Cagney & Lacey	Artie Lamotta / Buffet Customer	3 episodes
1982, 1990	Dallas	Politician #1	2 episodes
1983	CHiPs	Delivery Man	Episode: "Day of the Robot"
1983	The Fall Guy	Sheriff	Episode: "Happy Trails"
1983	Blood Feud	Teamster #1	Television film
1983	T. J. Hooker	Factory Worker	Episode: "Payday Pirates"
1983	Buffalo Bill	Fire Chief Schmidke	Episode: "Buffalo Bill and the Movies"
1983	Emergency Room	Mr. Hawkins	Television film
1983–1985	Hill Street Blues	Bascomb / Cop Referee	4 episodes
1983–1990	Knots Landing	Various roles	5 episodes
1984	The Jerk, Too	Security Guard #1	Television film
1984	Hardcastle and McCormick	Artie the Doorman	Episode: "Mr. Hardcastle Goes to Washington"
1984	AfterMASH	Patient	Episode: "Calling Doctor Habibi"
1984, 1992	Night Court	Bartender / Bailiff	2 episodes
1985	Street Hawk	Supermarket Driver	Episode: "Pilot"
1985	Not My Kid	Parent	Television film
1985	Riptide	Workman	Episode: "Boz Busters"
1985	Highway to Heaven	Coach	2 episodes
1985	Knight Rider	Capt. Tom O'Mally	Episode: "Knight Strike"
1985	The Steel Collar Man	Truck Driver #1	Television film
1985	Hunter	Wilcher	Episode: "Million Dollar Misunderstanding"
1985	The Twilight Zone	Adult Jack Wheeldon	Episode: "One Life, Furnished in Early Poverty"
1985, 1995	Murder, She Wrote	Todd Hawkins / Cop	2 episodes
1986	Annihilator	FBI Agent #1	Television film
1986	The Last Precinct	The Man	Episode: "I Want My Mummy"
1987, 1988	Star Trek: The Next Generation	Argyle	2 episodes
1988	Matlock	Ted	Episode: "The Fisherman"
1988	CBS Schoolbreak Special	Walt Sheren	Episode: "Gambler"
1989	Alien Nation	Man	Television film
1989, 1990	The Wonder Years	Ned / Man	2 episodes
1990	Drug Wars: The Camarena Story	FBI Forensics Man	3 episodes
1990	Freddy's Nightmares	Jake Johnson	Episode: "Prisoner of Love"
1990	Just Life	Rally Cop	Television film
1990	The Man Who Invented Edward Scissorhands	Dad	Television film
1990	Close Encounters	Man in his Fifties	Television film
1991	Sins of the Mother	Market Manager	Television film
1991	Aftermath: A Test of Love	Nelson Zenner	Television film
1991	Father Dowling Mysteries	Security Guard	Episode: "The Consulting Detective Mystery"
1991	The New Lassie	Worker	Episode: "No Pets Allowed"
1991	Life Goes On	Fire Inspector	Episode: "Toast"
1991	Reasonable Doubts	Hartung	Episode: "Hard Bargains"
1991	Seinfeld	Mr. Heyman	Episode: "The Library"
1991	Empty Nest	Businessman	Episode: "My Nurse Is Back and There's Gonna Be Trouble"
1991–1993	The Young and the Restless	Mel / Doorman	3 episodes
1992	The Golden Girls	Bellboy	Episode: "The Commitments"
1992	Sisters	Fireman	Episode: "The Four Elements"
1992	Bodies of Evidence	Mitch Fallon / Red Tie	2 episodes
1992	Room for Two	Security Guard	2 episodes
1992	Saved by the Bell: Hawaiian Style	Vincent Jensen	Television film
1992	Homefront	Buyer	Episode: "First Comes Love, Then Comes Marriage"
1993	Shaky Ground	Customer #2	Episode: "The Scarlet Letter"
1993	Bloodlines: Murder in the Family	Marshall	Television film
1993	Parker Lewis Can't Lose	Wrecking Ball Operator	Episode: "The Last Summer"
1994	Melrose Place	Auctioneer	Episode: "Love, Mancini Style"
1994	Married... with Children	Man	Episode: "Assault and Batteries"
1996	ABC Afterschool Special	Mr. Calder	Episode: "Too Soon for Jeff"
1996	Martin	Policeman	Episode: "Boo's in the House"
1999	Tracey Takes On...	Building Super	Episode: "Erotica"
2000	Little Richard	Farm Hand	Television film
2000	Judging Amy	Hal Chernoff	Episode: "The Wee Hours"
2000	Rude Awakening	Burt	Episode: "Judging Billie"
2001–2005	Gilmore Girls	Tom	13 episodes
2002, 2004	Scrubs	Pathologist / Dr. Walch	2 episodes
2011	Shameless	Billy	Episode: "Three Boys"
2011	Parks and Recreation	George / Lenny	3 episodes
2012	Scandal	Norm	Episode: "White Hats Off"
2012	The Mindy Project	Rink Employee	Episode: "Josh and Mindy's Christmas Party"
2012, 2013	Bunheads	Bob	2 episodes
2014	Hart of Dixie	Animal Wrangler	Episode: "Ring of Fire"
2014	Sequestered	Port Security	Episode: "Proof of Life"
2016	Preacher	Pappy	2 episodes
2016	Gilmore Girls: A Year in the Life	Tom	Episode: "Summer"
2017–2018	Walk the Prank	Mr. Borkman	9 episodes
2018	Legion	Thinking Man #2	Episode: "Chapter 14"
2019	Baskets	Duane	Episode: "Affirmations"
2021	Rutherford Falls	Cal	Episode: "Pilot"
