= Immigration Tango =

- Theatrical release poster
- Directed by: David Burton Morris
- Screenplay by: Martin L. Kelley; Robert J. Lee; Todd Norwood; Elika Portnoy
- Story by: Martin L. Kelley; Robert J. Lee
- Produced by: Elika Portnoy
- Starring: Elika Portnoy; McCaleb Burnett; Carlos Leon; Ashley Wolfe; Avery Sommers; Beth Glover
- Cinematography: Angel Barroeta; Taylor Gentry
- Edited by: Lee Cipolla; Misha Tenenbaum
- Music by: Dan Wool
- Production company: Mutressa Movies
- Distributed by: Roadside Attractions
- Release dates: April 17, 2010 (BIFF); February 18, 2011 (United States)
- Running time: 90 minutes
- Country: United States
- Language: English
- Box office: $24,554

Immigration Tango is a 2010 American comedy film directed by David Burton Morris and written by Martin L. Kelley, Robert J. Lee, Todd Norwood and Elika Portnoy. The film stars Elika Portnoy, McCaleb Burnett, Carlos Leon, Ashley Wolfe, Avery Sommers, and Beth Glover. The film was released on February 18, 2011, by Roadside Attractions.

== Cast ==
- Elika Portnoy as Elena Dubrovnik
- McCaleb Burnett as Mike White
- Carlos Leon as Carlos Sanchez
- Ashley Wolfe as Betty Bristol
- Avery Sommers as Ms. Ravencourt
- Beth Glover as Jill White
- Steve DuMouchel as Harold White
- Kristen Dawn McCorkell as Sarah White
- Brett Golov as Mr. Geneva

== Release ==
The film was released on February 18, 2011, by Roadside Attractions.
