= Mad God =

2021 American stop motion animated film

- Release poster
- Directed by: Phil Tippett
- Written by: Phil Tippett
- Produced by: Phil Tippett
- Starring: Alex Cox
- Cinematography: Chris Morley; Phil Tippett
- Edited by: Michael Cavanaugh; Ken Rogerson
- Music by: Dan Wool
- Production company: Tippett Studio
- Distributed by: Shudder; IFC Midnight
- Release dates: August 5, 2021 (Locarno); June 16, 2022 (United States)
- Running time: 83 minutes
- Country: United States
- Language: English
- Budget: $124,156
- Box office: $325,042

Mad God is a 2021 American adult stop-motion-animated horror film written, produced, and directed by Phil Tippett. Completed in 2021, it was produced over a period of 30 years.

Mad God premiered at the Locarno Festival on August 5, 2021, and was released in the United States by Shudder on June 16, 2022.

== Plot ==
Various people build and climb their way up a tall tower reaching toward a red, stormy sky before the tower is struck down.

A tall figure shrouded in a jacket and gas mask, credited as the Assassin, descends into a ruined, dystopian world via a diving bell. In his possession are a map and a briefcase. Traveling through the underworld, he encounters monstrous creatures mercilessly preyed upon by larger beasts and elaborate torture machines. Eventually, he reaches a city inhabited by an army of faceless drones constructed from feces, who mindlessly tend to physically laborious tasks, often dying in the process. When they begin to hear the cries and babbles of a baby, they abandon their tasks and wander towards the source – a tower containing screens displaying closeups of the being's eyes and bloody mouth. The Assassin joins them and briefly stares at a lone drone, but retreats into a trap door when a bipedal monstrosity beats and stomps on the drone. Deeper within the city, the Assassin discovers a mountain of briefcases just like his own. He opens his briefcase and takes out a time bomb, which he places and prepares to set off. He fails to notice a creeping monster behind him, which then attacks and drags him away as the bomb's ticking hand appears unable to complete its circuit.

The Assassin is shackled to a table and skinned in front of a mass of spectators, who watch his silhouette in a theater and laugh. He is revealed to be one of many fully skinned and bandaged figures laying on an operating table in a hospital. His exposed, bloodshot eye glances around, noticing the shadows of people in the hallway. A surgeon enters the Assassin's room with a nurse, cuts open his abdomen, and begins rummaging inside, pulling out jewelry and papers and throwing them to the floor. Eventually, the surgeon finds a wailing, infant larva-like creature, which he hands to the nurse, who carries it away.

The surgeon bores a hole in the Assassin's head and connects his brain to a television set. The surgeon watches the television, which depicts the world above, where a man known as the Last Man puts on a yarmulke and black slippers and looks under a table, where three gnarled witches cut a string before handing the Last Man a map. The Last Man enters a large room filled with figures dressed like the Assassin standing to attention. He gives his map to an Assassin who is waiting in the diving bell in the center of the room. The new Assassin takes it and descends to a ruined city where he checks his map. He grabs a nearby motorcycle which he rides until it breaks down, only then driving what is seemingly a rusted light utility vehicle. The Assassin follows the map descending through thousands of years of carnage and filth created by war, through a munitions depot, a graveyard and a war zone before descending a spiral roadway.

Back in the underworld, the nurse brings the infant to a ghostly, floating plague doctor, who escorts the child to an alchemist's lair. The alchemist grinds the infant into a powder, alchemically transforms the powder into gold, and uses the gold to create a new cosmos which undergoes the same cycle of evolution, civilization and self-destruction as the previous one. In doing so, the bomb's countdown concludes, and time rapidly progresses, with all kinds of clocks, hourglasses, and candles suddenly shifting forward.

== Production ==
While working on RoboCop 2, Tippett began filming what would become Mad God. His work on Jurassic Park led him to believe the days of stop-motion were over, and the film was shelved.

Twenty years later, with the encouragement of members of his studio, Tippett began working on the project again, utilizing crews of volunteers to assist him.

"So on the weekends I would get as many as 15 and 20 people coming round. They didn't all have the talent or skill, but I'd figure out the processes during the week. I had them do all the heavy lifting."

With aid from Kickstarter donations, Tippett created the first three sections, which make up about half of the film. He released a behind-the-scenes footage on YouTube during production.

=== Sound design ===
In 2013, Academy Award-winning sound designer Richard Beggs agreed to do the project's sound design and mixing.

=== VR-short ===
In 2016, a two-minute short VR-version (Virtual Reality-version) of the movie was released. All characters were animated and shot separately in front of a green screen using Dragon software; then Nuke was used to compose all the characters together in front of a background.

=== Music ===
The original score was composed by Dan Wool, who started work on the project in 2010 and developed the score in chapters until the release in 2021. The soundtrack album, released by Waxwork Records, was released June 21, 2022 on double-vinyl and CD.

In 2023, Wool released an alternative digital-only version of the soundtrack album, incorporating more of Richard Beggs' sound design for MAD GOD.

== Release ==
Mad God premiered at the 74th Locarno Film Festival on August 5, 2021. Shudder acquired its distribution rights, planning a limited release in theaters and on AMC+ on June 16, 2022.

== Reception ==
=== Box office ===
In the United States and Canada, the film earned $8,416 from two theaters in its opening weekend. It expanded to 26 theaters in its second weekend and made $36,588. It added $24,451 in its third weekend, $37,617 in its fourth, and $16,280 in its fifth, ultimately grossing more than double its $150,000 budget in its limited theatrical release.

=== Critical response ===
On review aggregator Rotten Tomatoes, Mad God holds an approval rating of 92%, based on 91 reviews, and an average rating of 7.9/10. Its consensus reads, "A rich visual treat for film fans, Mad God proves that even in the age of CGI, the cinematic allure of stop-motion animation remains strong." On Metacritic, the film has a weighted average score of 80 out of 100, based on 14 critics, indicating "generally favorable" reviews.

Jeannette Catsoulis of The New York Times described the film as "a vivid and valuable showcase for disappearing skills". Carlos Aguilar wrote a profile of Tippett and the production of Mad God – "the most complete expression of his erudite image-making expertise" – in the same publication.

John Defore of The Hollywood Reporter praised the film's animation, bleak atmosphere and design, calling it "a tech achievement FX geeks will need to see", and "among the bleakest dystopias [of] science fiction". Sight and Sound's John Bleasdale offered similar praise while also criticizing its bleak setting, summarizing that the film "has all the makings of an instant cult classic". Scoring the film four out of five stars, Drew Tinnin from Dread Central praised the design, atmosphere and animation, as well as the film's soundtrack, calling it "sheer artistry coming to life".

Rafael Motamayor of IndieWire rated the film a B, writing "Mad God, a cacophony of savagery and cruelty– [offering] no hope, no respite from the awe-inspiring terror." Nerdist's Kyle Anderson rated the film a score of 4.5 out of 5, offering similar praise to the film's atmosphere, visuals, bleak setting, and production design while noting the film's simplistic narrative. Reviewing for Tilt Magazine, critic Thomas O'Connor called the film "a deeply unsettling spectacle", highlighting the film as a technical achievement in stop-motion animation, as well as praising the film's bleak atmosphere and disturbing imagery.

Christopher Stewardson from Our Culture Magazine rated the film four out of five stars, commending the animation, visual design, hellish atmosphere, and dream-like quality, writing "Mad God almost has an anti-war ring to it. In its abstract madness, it presents the nightmare of what war does. Nobody is human. Only monsters exist".

=== Accolades ===
Award	Date of ceremony	Category	Recipient(s)	Result	Ref.
L'Étrange Festival	September 19, 2021	Audience Award	Mad God	Won	
The Ray Harryhausen Awards	June 29, 2022	Best Feature Film Animation	Mad God	Won	
Chicago Film Critics Association	December 14, 2022	Best Animated Film	Mad God	Nominated	
Austin Film Critics Association	January 10, 2023	Best Animated Film	Mad God	Nominated	
Seattle Film Critics Society	January 17, 2023	Best Animated Feature	Phil Tippett	Nominated	
Visual Effects Society Awards	February 15, 2023	Outstanding Visual Effects in an Animated Feature	Chris Morley, Phil Tippett, Ken Rogerson, Tom Gibbons	Nominated	
Visual Effects Society Awards	February 15, 2023	Outstanding Special (Practical) Effects in a Photoreal Project	Phil Tippett, Chris Morley, Webster Colcord, Johnny McLeod	Nominated	
Annie Awards	February 25, 2023	Outstanding Achievement for Music in an Animated Feature Production	Dan Wool	Nominated	
Annie Awards	February 25, 2023	Outstanding Achievement for Production Design in an Animated Feature Production	Phil Tippett	Nominated	
Fangoria Chainsaw Awards	May 21, 2023	Best Limited Release	Mad God	Nominated	
