= Sy Richardson =

American film and television actor (born 1941)

- Born: June 4, 1941 (age 85); Cincinnati, Ohio, U.S.
- Education: Kennedy–King College (AA); University of Colorado Boulder (BS)
- Occupation: Actor
- Military career
- Branch: United States Navy

Symon Lionel Richardson (born June 4, 1941) is an American film and television actor. Also a two-time screenwriter, Richardson wrote the screenplay for the 1993 film Posse.

== Early life and education ==
He was born in Cincinnati and grew up in Chicago. He attended Farragut Career Academy. He served two years in the United States Navy. He received an associate of arts in black history and music from Kennedy–King College in 1972 and received a Bachelor of Science in journalism, specializing in advertising, from the University of Colorado Boulder in 1975.

== Career ==
Richardson made his film debut as the Fairy Godmother, in the 1977 American erotic musical comedy Cinderella. He is perhaps best known as a regular in the films of Alex Cox, having appeared in Repo Man, Sid and Nancy, Straight to Hell, Walker, The Winner and Searchers 2.0. He played "Turbo" in the 1990 film Tripwire. He recently had a recurring role as the coroner on the TV series Pushing Daisies. He also appeared in They Live and Colors.

== Filmography ==
=== Film ===
Year	Title	Role	Notes
1977	Cinderella	Fairy godmother	
1977	Petey Wheatstraw	Petey's father	
1978	Fairy Tales	Sirus	
1979	Nocturna: Granddaughter of Dracula	RH Factor	
1983	My Brother's Wedding	Mr. Dubois	
1984	Repo Man	Lite	
1986	Sid and Nancy	Methadone Caseworker	
1987	Straight to Hell	Norwood	
1987	Walker	Capt. Hornsby	
1987	Cold Steel	Rashid	
1987	Medium Rare	Marv	
1988	Tapeheads	Bartender	
1988	Dead Man Walking	Snake	
1988	Bad Dreams	Detective Wasserman	
1988	Colors	Bailey	
1988	They Live	Black Revolutionary	
1989	Three Fugitives	Tucker	
1989	Kinjite: Forbidden Subjects	Lavonne	
1989	Mystery Train	Newsvendor	Segment: "A Ghost"
1989	Tripwire	Turbo	
1990	To Sleep with Anger	Marsh	
1990	Catchfire	Capt. Walker	
1990	Street Asylum	Sgt. 'Joker' Tatum	
1990	Men at Work	Walt Richardson	
1990	The Grifters	Cab driver	Uncredited
1993	Ring of Fire II: Blood and Steel	Ernest	
1993	Eye of the Stranger	Jeb	
1993	Posse	Shepherd	Also screenwriter
1994	Floundering	Commander K	
1994	The Glass Shield	Mr. Taylor	
1996	Killin' Me Softly	Mr. Richardson	
1996	The Winner	Bartender	
1996	Evil Obsession	Jim	
1998	Shattered Illusions	Gene	
1998	Erasable You	Miliatant	
1998	Mr. P's Dancing Sushi Bar	Harry	
2000	The Playaz Court	Ike	
2001	Human Nature	Police detective	
2001	Extreme Honor	Schultz	
2004	Surviving Christmas	Doo-Dah Understudy	
2007	Lord Help Us	Church member	Direct-to-video
2007	The Dukes of Hazzard: The Beginning	Shiner #2	
2007	Sister's Keeper	Cornelious	
2007	All About Us	Willie Earl	
2007	Searchers 2.0	Fritz Frobisher	
2008	South of Heaven	Pawn Daddy	
2008	Shattered!	Art	
2010	Our Family Wedding	Sonny	
2010	A Numbers Game	Bernie	
2010	Straight to Hell Returns	Norwood	
2011	Monkey Man	Mr. Greenwood	
2011	Larry Crowne	Avery	
2012	House Arrest	Paster P	
2013	The Pain Killers	Reverend Samuel	
2015	Faith of Our Fathers	Dan	
2016	The Reluctant Polyglot	Harris Liepo	
2016	Can I Get a Witness Protection?	Eddie	
2017	Message from a Mistress	Mr. Hall	
2016	The God of Death	Tony Red	
2019	5th of July	Pops	

=== Television ===
Year	Title	Role	Notes
1985	Hill Street Blues	Baggage Attendant	Episode: "In the Belly of the Bus"
1989	Falcon Crest	Detective Olen	Episode: "Doctor Dollars"
1990	Wings	Luther	Episode: "Return to Nantucket: Part 1"
1990	Gabriel's Fire	Miles Parker	Episode: "I'm Nobody"
1990	The New Adam 12	Mr. Simms	Episode: "Framed"
1991	Clippers	Customer	Television film
1991	China Beach	Franklin	Episode: "Through and Through"
1992	Cheers	Gordon	Episode: "No Rest for the Woody"
1993	Hangin' with Mr. Cooper	Mr. Gooding	Episode: "How to Succeed in Business Without Really Trying"
1993	Crime & Punishment	Willie Carson	Episode: "Best Laid Plans"
1995	Martin	Boss man	Episode: "The Romantic Weekend"
1997	Malcolm & Eddie	Mr. Brooks	Episode: "Jugglin'"
1997	Players	Slider	Episode: "Con Law"
1998	Profiler	Gus	Episode: "Double Vision"
1999	Becker	Mr. Duncan	Episode: "Limits & Boundaries"
1999	Any Day Now		Episode: "Don't Say Anything"
1999	Heat Vision and Jack	Doctor	Television film
2000	After Diff'rent Strokes: When the Laughter Stopped	Mr. Coleman	Television film
2002	The Division	Bus driver	Episode: "Long Day's Journey"
2003	L.A. County 187	Leotis Brown	Television film
2003	ER	Coleman	Episode: "Out of Africa"
2003	Dragnet	Manassas PD Capt. Leonard	Episode: "Slice of Life"
2004	Charmed	Father Wilkins	Episode: "A Wrong Day's Journey Into Right"
2005	The Shield	Brother William	Episode: "Insurgents"
2006, 2007	Monk	Janitor / Sanitation Worker	2 episodes
2007	Cold Case	Byron '07	Episode: "It Takes a Village"
2007–2009	Pushing Daisies	Coroner	12 episodes
2008	Lincoln Heights	Family Member #3	Episode: "The Day Before Tomorrow"
2008	Chocolate News	Clarence Baldwin	Episode #1.10
2010	Medium Rare	Marv	Episode #1.1
2012	Prime Suspect	Man	Episode: "Stuck in the Middle with You"
2012	Rizzoli & Isles	Sour Grapes	Episode: "This Is How a Heart Breaks"
2013	NCIS	Lester	Episode: "Hit and Run"
2013	FutureStates	Luther	Episode: "The Living"
2014	Benched	Moon Rock	Episode: "Shark, Actually"
2015	Documentary Now!	David	Episode: "Sandy Passage"
2017	Like Family	Greg	3 episodes
2020	Family Reunion	Brother Franklin	Episode: "Remember Our Parents' Wedding?"
2020	Broke	Henry	Episode: "The Test"
