= Pray for Rain (band) =

American instrumental musical group

Pray for Rain is a San Francisco, California-based music production company and recording group specialising in film soundtracks, led by St. Louis, Missouri musician Dan Wool. Past members of Pray for Rain include Gary Brown, Paul Trupin, and James Woody. Originally a performing post-punk band active in San Francisco in the 1980s and 1990s, Pray for Rain transitioned to being a soundtrack-collective after scoring the film Sid and Nancy.

Among their many soundtracks are the scores to several Alex Cox films, including Sid and Nancy, Straight to Hell, The Winner, Death and the Compass, and Three Businessmen. They also worked on the music for the 1998 David Schwimmer film Since You've Been Gone, the 1998 film Standoff, and the Fox TV series Key West.

In 1992, Pray for Rain threatened a lawsuit against Christian rock group Pray for Rain, who then shortened their name to PFR, allowing Pray for Rain to retain the name.
