= Walker (film) =

1987 Alex Cox film

- Video release poster
- Directed by: Alex Cox
- Written by: Rudy Wurlitzer
- Produced by: Lorenzo O'Brien; Angel Flores Marini
- Starring: Ed Harris; Richard Masur; René Auberjonois; Peter Boyle; Miguel Sandoval; Marlee Matlin
- Cinematography: David Bridges; Steven Fierberg; Tom Richmond
- Edited by: Alex Cox; Carlos Puente
- Music by: Joe Strummer
- Production companies: In-Cine Compañía Industrial Cinematográfica; Northern; Walker Films Ltd.
- Distributed by: Universal Pictures (U.S.); United International Pictures (international)
- Release dates: December 4, 1987 (U.S.); January 13, 1989 (Mexico)
- Running time: 94 minutes
- Countries: United States; Mexico
- Languages: English; Spanish
- Budget: $6 million
- Box office: $257,043 (US)

Walker is a 1987 historical Weird Western film directed by Alex Cox and written by Rudy Wurlitzer. It stars Ed Harris as William Walker, the American filibuster who invaded and made himself president of Nicaragua. The cast also features Richard Masur, René Auberjonois, Peter Boyle, Miguel Sandoval and Marlee Matlin.

An American-Mexican co-production, Walker was filmed on-location in Nicaragua, during the Contra War. The film is intentionally full of postmodern anachronisms, such as helicopters, Zippo lighters, automatic rifles, Diet Coke, magazines and cars. Joe Strummer, formerly of the Clash, scored the film.

Walker was released by Universal Pictures on December 4, 1987 to generally polarized reviews and grossed nearly $300,000 against a production budget of $6 million, becoming a box-office bomb. Retrospective reviews have been much more positive, and the film has developed a cult following.

== Plot ==
In 1853, American soldier-of-fortune William Walker flees Mexico, after a failed attempt to incite an armed insurrection. He is placed on trial by a U.S. official for breaking the Neutrality Act, but wins an acquittal after giving a rousing speech to the jury. Afterwards, multimillionaire Cornelius Vanderbilt offers a job to Walker to bring stability to Nicaragua by assisting the Democratic Party in its civil war against the Legitimists. Doing so would secure Vanderbilt's rights over an overland shipping route between the Atlantic Ocean and the Pacific Ocean. Walker initially declines, planning instead to settle down and start a newspaper. However, when his fiancée Ellen Martin suddenly dies of cholera, he accepts and hires 60 mercenaries to join him on his mission.

Despite significant losses, Walker and his company score a bloody victory in Nicaragua, first in Rivas and then in the Conservative capital of Granada. In the midst of battle, Walker calmly strolls through the battlefield, seemingly unconcerned by the gunfire and death surrounding him. When the capital falls, Walker allows the President to stay in charge while the president's mistress, Doña Yrena, seduces Walker. After discovering that the President is attempting to rally other countries in Central America to unite and repel the Americans, Walker orders the President executed for treason and assumes the presidency for himself via a rigged election.

From 1855 to 1857, Walker's actions as president become increasingly manic and delusional, antagonizing his financial backer by revoking Vanderbilt's license to the overland trade route and seizing his ships. When one of Walker's brothers challenges his authority, Walker kills him without hesitation. Cut off from supplies and reinforcements, he decides to introduce slavery to Nicaragua in an attempt to gain support among the Southern U.S. states, causing the African American members of his legion to quit in protest. The situation continues to deteriorate as neighboring countries invade Nicaragua. Yrena returns and attempts to convince Walker to stop the carnage - when he refuses, she attempts to kill him, but fails and is forced to run away. Incensed, Walker instructs his men to burn down the town.

Taking refuge in the church, Walker gives one final speech to his few remaining men and the Nicaraguan prisoners, stating that the day will never come where America will leave Nicaragua alone, as "it is America's destiny" to be there.

As Walker and his men exit the church, singing "Onward, Christian Soldiers", a helicopter arrives filled with American troops clad in modern-day military gear. A man from the helicopter explains that he has been ordered by the State Department to return all American citizens to their homeland. When he asks Walker what his nationality is, Walker replies "I'm William Walker, President of the Republic of Nicaragua," so he is left behind. Walker is executed on the beach by Honduran soldiers.

As the credits roll, a television screen displays various clips of President Ronald Reagan discussing the presence of U.S. troops in Nicaragua, the U.S. military conducting "training exercises" off the coast of Nicaragua, and a woman washing the dead bodies of Contras victims.

== Cast ==
- Ed Harris as William Walker
- Richard Masur as E. G. Squier
- René Auberjonois as Major Siegfried Henningson
- Keith Szarabajka as Timothy Crocker
- Sy Richardson as Captain Hornsby
- Xander Berkeley as Byron Cole
- John Diehl as Stebbins
- Peter Boyle as Cornelius Vanderbilt
- Marlee Matlin as Ellen Martin
- Alfonso Arau as Gaston de Raousset-Boulbon
- Pedro Armendáriz, Jr. as Muñoz
- Gerrit Graham as Norvell Walker
- William O'Leary as James Walker
- Blanca Guerra as Doña Yrena
- Miguel Sandoval as Parker French
- Rick Barker as Breckenridge
- Karl Braun as Bruno von Natzmer
- Kathy Burke as Annie Mae
- Richard Edson as Turley
- Bennet Guillory as Achilles Kewen
- David Hayman as Father Rossiter
- Dick Rude as Washburn
- Zander Schloss as Huey
- Milton Selzer as Judge
- Edward Tudor-Pole as Doubleday
- Norbert Weisser as Prange
- Biff Yeager as Max / Carpetbagger
- Del Zamora as Padre Vigil
- Richard Zobel as Lemuel
- Joe Strummer as Faucet
- Fox Harris as District Attorney

== Production ==
Alex Cox first visited Nicaragua in 1984, during the national election campaign for which Daniel Ortega became president, to see if conditions were as bad as the American media had reported. He discovered that this was not the case. The filmmaker was persuaded to return by two wounded soldiers from the Sandinista army. He later learned of the historical Walker from an article in Mother Jones that was largely about US foreign policy in Central America and decided to bring his story to the screen. A history professor at the University of California lent Cox a library card so he could do more research on Walker. "The more I read about him the more bizarre this seemed", Cox remembers. He hired Rudy Wurlitzer to write the screenplay because, according to Cox: "He understands American guys and the mad impulse that drives certain Americans to be great men." Cox was not interested in making what he called a long, respectful historical drama that would be shown on Masterpiece Theatre because Walker "leads a disastrous misadventure. He's a pretty bad guy. I didn't think it was possible to approach it in this normal, historical, respectful style."

The budget was set at six million dollars with most of the film being shot in Granada, Nicaragua. To get into character, Ed Harris led the entire cast in a 10-mile (16.1-km) forced march through the Nicaraguan countryside. The actor was drawn to the challenge of playing someone "who has incredible moral convictions but turns into such an evil person in the name of spreading democracy." He was also drawn to the script's politics, claiming to be anti-Contra and anti-intervention in Nicaragua and saw making a film there as a way to possibly stop the bloodshed.

Cox got the cooperation of the Sandinista government and the Roman Catholic Church because he wanted his production to be a "force for peace and reconciliation." The Guatemalan government, apparently in a desire to please America, held up Cox at the Nicaraguan border for a week with his entire cast and crew, obliterating his budget. Cox, producer Edward R. Pressman, and leading actor Ed Harris all donated from their own wages in order to bring the film back on track. After a report that Cox was shooting in Nicaragua appeared in The New York Times, the film bond company sent an inspector and threatened to pull the bond multiple times, requiring Cox to respond with legal threats while filming continued. The delays also meant there was limited time for reshooting. One scene where both of Walker's brothers were supposed to be present only had one appear on set. On another day, Ed Harris ad-libbed an entire speech about how America will "be back" and will never "leave Nicaragua alone". This was filmed "just in case" and ended up appearing in the final film.

The dying economy of Granada received a significant boost by the production with 300 local carpenters hired to build sets, 6,000 people hired as extras and army supplied security guards and a Soviet-built MI-18 transport helicopter used in the film. Electricity poles in the town plaza were torn down leaving homes without light. Some families were left temporarily without a telephone because the production needed their lines and the government could not afford to install new ones. The central square was covered with several inches of dirt to recreate 1850s conditions. The screenplay was edited by the country's Vice-President Sergio Ramirez and Minister of Culture Ernesto Cardenal, who were also a novelist and a poet respectively. Both men, along with the Minister of Education, the country's Interior Minister, and a military commander, would occasionally visit the set. Two people were accidentally killed during principal photography, both in separate vehicular-related incidents. For one of the deaths, the movie company paid for the funeral and compensated the family. The shooting conditions were difficult because of all of the fires the locals were building, making the air thick and hard to breathe.

Even after filming was over, Cox stayed in Granada, editing the film. He said: "I think we have kind of a duty not to just be the rich gringos and come down here and spend eight weeks and then disappear."

== Historical accuracy ==
As described by Roger Ebert in his review for the Chicago Sun-Times: "... anachronisms, guest stars, quixotic poker-faced heroes and utterly pointless scripts", were the hallmark of films helmed by Cox. There are a number of intentional anachronisms placed to draw comparison between 1850s and 1980s Nicaragua. For example, the characters are shown reading Newsweek and Time, and a computer monitor is visible in Vanderbilt's study. As the movie progresses, the inaccuracies become more and more extreme and it is evident that Cox was using the device to accentuate modern-day events with the Walker era.

Historical accuracy is done away with in a dramatic retelling of Walker's coup d'état. There is no evidence that Walker ever met Vanderbilt or received his support, as the movie suggests. Rather, Walker was supported by Vanderbilt's competitors, Charles Morgan and Cornelius Garrison, owners of the Nicaragua Transit Company in his time. James Buchanan is incorrectly mentioned as being the President of the United States after Walker's trial, prior to his Nicaraguan expedition. Franklin Pierce was actually the president at the time. Ellen Martin, Walker's fiancée, died in 1850. In the movie, she is present at his 1854 trial for violating US neutrality laws, after he invaded Baja California and Sonora Mexico, dying shortly thereafter.

Minor inconsistencies include use of bolt-action rifles, weapons from the World War I era, and Navy Colts in Walker's army, not in general use, until midway through the American Civil War, almost a decade later, but it was obvious that Cox was little concerned with historical accuracy.

== Soundtrack ==
Joe Strummer had worked previously with Cox on Sid and Nancy and Straight to Hell, contributing songs to their respective soundtracks. He wanted to compose an entire score for a film and Walker afforded him such an opportunity. After filming his small part in the film, he would go back to his room and record bits of music onto a four-track cassette using an acoustic guitar and a little plastic synthesizer with guitarist Zander Schloss. They drew inspiration from local music played in bars – a mix of reggae, calypso and Brazilian music.

== Reception ==
Walker originally garnered polarized reviews. Rita Kempley wrote that "it's gross as it is muddled as it is absurd" in her review for The Washington Post. Fellow Washington Post reviewer Desson Howe criticized the "perplexing fusion of cartoon and docudrama..." In his review for Newsweek, David Ansen wrote that "[Cox's] scenes have no shape, his characters are stick figures, the wit is undergraduate and his soggy set pieces of slow-motion carnage are third-rate Peckinpah imitations." Gene Siskel gave the film zero stars and called it "unquestionably one of the worst films of the year, made even more shocking because it was directed by the often inventive Alex Cox." Gene Siskel's cohost Roger Ebert also gave the film a rare zero-star rating and each critic gave it a thumbs down. Ebert's print review in The Chicago Sun-Times said Walker was so bad Harris and Matlin should find new agents, and the film overall was "pointless and increasingly obnoxious" and betrayed the promise of Cox's early films Repo Man and Sid & Nancy which Ebert admired.

However Jay Scott gave the film a positive review in The Globe and Mail, arguing that "Cox exposes the limitations of historical drama in Walker with a calculated disregard of its conventions." Vincent Canby also praised Cox's film in The New York Times writing that "Walker is witty, rather than laugh-out-loud funny. Without being solemn, it's deadly serious... Walker is something very rare in American movies these days. It has some nerve." Jonathan Rosenbaum wrote in The Chicago Reader that the film was "all over the place and excessive, but as a radical statement about the U.S.’s involvement in [Nicaragua] it packs a very welcome wallop...One can certainly quarrel with some aspects of the film’s treatment of history, but with political cowardice in commercial filmmaking so prevalent, one can only admire this movie’s gusto in calling a spade a spade, and the exhilaration of its anger and wit." Jim Hoberman praised it in The Village Voice as "a superbly scurrilous and daringly self-destructive attack on the Reagan regime’s Central American policies (and the Monroe Doctrine as well). In his burlesque retelling the story of William Walker, 19th century “freebooter” who ruled Nicaragua, Cox refuses to recreate the past — or even dignify it." Ben Sachs in The Chicago Reader would later observe that the film's reputation had grown steadily since its release and was now regarded as "one of the key films of its era."

Director Alex Cox was never employed again by a major Hollywood studio, and his subsequent films have received only limited distribution in the United States. In a 2008 interview with The A.V. Club, Cox said: "Distribution is controlled by the studios, and I've been on the blacklist of the studios for the last 20 years... The last movie I was asked to direct was The Running Man... which was actually quite a good film, I thought. I would have liked to have done The Running Man. It was just that Walker happened at the same time."

On Rotten Tomatoes, Walker presently holds a rating of 44% from 16 reviews.

=== Awards ===
Walker was nominated for the Golden Bear at the 38th Berlin International Film Festival.

== Home media releases ==
The Criterion Collection released a Region 1 DVD on February 19, 2008 with features that include: an audio commentary by Cox and screenwriter Wurlitzer; Dispatches from Nicaragua, an original documentary about the filming of Walker; On Moviemaking and the Revolution, reminiscences 20 years later from an extra on the film; behind-the-scenes photographs; and a booklet featuring writings by film critic Graham Fuller, Wurlitzer and Linda Sandoval.

On January 18, 2022, Criterion announced that Walker will be receiving a Region A Blu-ray upgrade on April 12, 2022. The upgraded release will include all of the 2008 DVD's special features along with a "restored high-definition digital transfer, [and an] uncompressed monaural soundtrack," approved by the film's director. Also included are two short films by Cox, Walker 2008 and On the Origins of “Walker,” and a trailer for the film.

== See also ==
- Cult film
- Postmodernist film
- List of films featuring the deaf and hard of hearing
