= Searchers 2.0 =

- Directed by: Alex Cox
- Written by: Alex Cox
- Produced by: Jon Davison
- Starring: Del Zamora; Ed Pansullo; Jaclyn Jonet; Sy Richardson
- Cinematography: Stephen Fierberg
- Edited by: Alex Cox
- Music by: Dan Wool
- Release dates: August 31, 2007 (Venice); October 26, 2010 (United States)
- Running time: 96 minutes
- Country: United States
- Language: English
- Budget: $180,000

Searchers 2.0 is a 2007 Western road film directed by Alex Cox. It stars Del Zamora and Ed Pansullo. Described by Cox as a "microfeature," it was shot on digital video in 10 days for a budget of $180,000. Lacking distribution, it featured a very limited theatrical run of one-night showings at various theaters throughout 2007 and 2008, followed by its premiere on BBC in the UK, and eventual DVD release in Japan and North America. The film marks Cox's return to the comedy genre, his first since Straight to Hell, 20 years prior.

In the film, two former child actors seek revenge against a screenwriter who had violently abused them during their childhood.

== Plot ==
The story follows two out of work actors, Mel and Fred. Mel works part-time as a day laborer. They learn that screenwriter Fritz Frobisher, who had violently abused the two actors with a whip during a childhood acting job, will be appearing at a screening of one of his films that will take place in Monument Valley. The two decide to travel from Los Angeles to the screening, but neither owns a car, so they convince Mel's daughter, Delilah, to drive them on their revenge journey.

== Cast ==
- Del Zamora as Mel Torres
- Ed Pansull as Fred Fletcher
- Jaclyn Jonet as Delilah Torres
- Sy Richardson as Fritz Frobisher
- Leonard Maltin as Film critic
- Zahn McClarnon as Rusty Frobisher
- Cy Carter as Director
- Andres Carranza as Mexican Guy
- Jason Norquist as Driver
- Roger Corman as Producer
- Brandon Carlos as Young Mel
- Steven Fierberg as Proprietor
- Alex Cox as Entrepreneur
- Esther Williams as Goulding's Employee #1
- Linda Litsui as Goulding's Employee #2
- Larry Holiday as Golfer #1
- Lorenz Holiday as Golfer #2
- Tim League as Roustabout #1
- Simon Tams as Cameraman

== Production ==
Portions of the film were shot in the Coachella Valley, California.
