= Three Businessmen =

1998 film by Alex Cox

- Directed by: Alex Cox
- Written by: Tod Davies
- Produced by: Tod Davies
- Starring: Alex Cox; Miguel Sandoval; Robert Wisdom
- Cinematography: Rob Tregenza
- Edited by: Bob Robertson
- Music by: Pray for Rain
- Release date: October 1998 (HIFF)
- Running time: 82 minutes
- Countries: United Kingdom; Netherlands; United States
- Language: English

Three Businessmen is a 1998 comedy film directed by Alex Cox and written by Tod Davies, who was also the producer. It is an international co-production between the United Kingdom, Netherlands, and United States. Two businessmen, played by Miguel Sandoval and Cox, wander Liverpool in search of a meal. After wandering through Liverpool, they end up at various locations throughout the world and are eventually joined by a third businessman, played by Robert Wisdom.

== Plot ==
Art dealers Benny (Miguel Sandoval) and Frank (Alex Cox) set out in Liverpool in search of a meal, and end up in a whirlwind trip around the Earth in search of food. After meeting businessman Leroy (Robert Wisdom) in the desert, they discover they are present at the birth of the new female Messiah... and promptly forget again.

== Production ==
In 1996, Dutch television producer Wim Kayzer contacted director Alex Cox and said he was looking for a project that fit the themes of "beauty and consolation". After discussing various ideas with Kayzer, including thunderstorms, Cox turned to writer-producer Tod Davies, who had an existing idea about two couples who roam the world in search of a meal over the course of one night. The lead characters were written for Sandoval and Cox, though James Gandolfini was considered for the role of Benny. The story was inspired by The Discreet Charm of the Bourgeoisie and My Dinner with Andre. The film's original title was Dad Has Left the Building, a reference to the film's ending, in which a new messiah is born.

After securing around $250,000 in funding from Japanese investors, the Netherlands Film Fund, and Kayzer, they began shooting in March 1998. Locations included Liverpool, Rotterdam, Hong Kong, Tokyo, and Almería, Spain. The scenes set in the desert were initially planned to be shot in Mexico, but Cox wanted to keep costs down by not traveling to a third continent; he also cited the Biblical look of Almería.

The score by Dan Wool and Pray for Rain features Deborah Harry singing a techno version "Ghost Riders in the Sky".

== Release ==
The film premiered at the Hamptons International Film Festival in October 1998. The international premiere was in 1999. Kayzer wanted the international premiere on Dutch television station VPRO, where he worked, and urged Cox to decline a spot at the Rotterdam Film Festival. The Rotterdam Film Fund, in turn, wanted Cox to take a position at the festival as a judge and to premiere his film there. Cox, caught between opposing obligations, chose to hold the international premiere at the festival. Upset, Kayzer lost interest in screening the film. The Rotterdam screening went poorly, which Cox attributed to audiences wanting a fast-paced, entertaining film like Repo Man, rather than a slower, philosophical film. Like most of Cox's films, it received a limited theatrical release.

== Reception ==
Writing for Variety, Oliver Jones called it "a dramatically turgid concept piece" that nonetheless has a satisfying ending and good acting from Cox. Although criticizing the writing, Jones complimented Davies' producing. Brendan Boyle of PopMatters rated it 7/10 stars and compared it to city-symphony films, saying the focus is on abstraction. He cited the play Waiting for Godot and the film The Exterminating Angel as influences, calling Three Businessmen more humanistic. In Screening Early Modern Drama: Beyond Shakespeare, academic Pascale Aebischer described it as a critique of consumerism that was influenced by the Latin American film movement Third Cinema.

== Bibliography ==
- Cox, Alex (2008). X Films: True Confessions of a Radical Filmmaker. I.B. Tauris. ISBN 9781593761936 – via Internet Archive.
