= Straight to Hell (film) =

1987 film by Alex Cox

- Theatrical release poster
- Directed by: Alex Cox
- Written by: Dick Rude; Alex Cox
- Based on: Django Kill... If You Live, Shoot! by Giulio Questi
- Produced by: Eric Fellner
- Starring: Sy Richardson; Joe Strummer; Dick Rude; Courtney Love; The Pogues; Elvis Costello; Dennis Hopper; Grace Jones; Edward Tudor-Pole; Jim Jarmusch
- Cinematography: Tom Richmond
- Edited by: David Martin
- Music by: The Pogues; Pray for Rain; Joe Strummer
- Production companies: Initial Pictures; Commies from Mars
- Distributed by: Miracle Films (United Kingdom); Island Pictures (United States)
- Release dates: 12 June 1987 (United Kingdom); 26 June 1987 (United States)
- Running time: 86 minutes
- Countries: United Kingdom; United States
- Language: English
- Budget: US$1 million
- Box office: $210,200

Straight to Hell is a 1987 spaghetti Western parody film directed by Alex Cox and starring Sy Richardson, Joe Strummer, Dick Rude, and Courtney Love. Loosely based on Django Kill... If You Live, Shoot! (1967), the film follows three male bank robbers and their gun moll who become stranded in the desert, where they stumble upon a surreal Western town inhabited by coffee-addicted killers. Dennis Hopper, Grace Jones, Miguel Sandoval, Elvis Costello, Xander Berkeley, Edward Tudor-Pole, Kathy Burke, and Jim Jarmusch are also featured in the film, along with band members of the Pogues, Amazulu, and the Circle Jerks. The film borrows its title from the Clash's 1982 song of the same name.

Director Cox and star Dick Rude wrote the screenplay for Straight to Hell over three days, rapidly developing the project after the cancellation of a planned concert tour in Nicaragua. Cox invited several members of the bands involved—including Strummer (of The Clash), as well as The Pogues—to appear in the film. Principal photography took place over four weeks in the summer of 1986 in Almería, Spain.

Straight to Hell received few positive reviews upon release, and was not a commercial success, although it later gained a cult film status. A soundtrack, including music by some of the musician/actors who starred in the film, was also released. On 14 December 2010, an extended cut of the film, titled Straight to Hell Returns, was released on DVD, featuring additional footage and digitally enhanced picture quality. This version of the film, under the collaboration of Alex Cox, was also screened at several cinemas as part of a midnight movie theatrical run.

== Plot ==
Three hitmen, Willy, Norwood, and Simms, are staying in a Los Angeles hotel. After failing a job, they take off in a car with Velma, Norwood's pregnant wife. They flee to Mexico to escape the wrath of their boss, Amos Dade, robbing a bank along the way. While driving through the desert, their car breaks down, having accidentally filled the tank with diesel. They bury their suitcase of money and begin to walk.

Night falls, and they come upon a nearly deserted town, where they enter an empty bar and the three men get drunk while Velma pesters them to leave. The group camps out for the night on the edge of town, and the following morning Velma witnesses several trucks of cowboys enter the town, carrying espresso machines with them. Much to the dismay of Velma, who insists they keep a low profile and leave, the three men enter the town, which is now full of townspeople, and go back to the bar.

There they are confronted by Bruno and Angel-Eyes, two members of the gang that runs the town, the McMahon clan. A stand-off ensues, but before guns are drawn, another group, led by a man named Rusty Zimmerman, arrives to arrest Bruno and Angel-Eyes for previous (minor) crimes. However the three hitmen kill Zimmerman and his cadre, saving the McMahon brothers. They are ultimately welcomed by the townspeople for this action. The bizarre townspeople include George and Fabienne, a couple who own a general store, Karl, a man running a hot dog stand, and countless cowboys and other unusual characters. The head honcho of the town, Frank McMahon, invites the gang to a party that evening. The following day, Frank's elderly father is pushed off of a building by his relative Sabrina. The entire town has a funeral procession for him, and at the funeral another employee of Mr. Dade, named Whitey, shows up looking for the hitmen and Velma.

The town seizes Whitey for being a "stranger", and accuses him of the murder of the McMahon grandfather. On the gallows, Whitey begins to tell the town about a bounty on the hitmen, but is hanged before he can tell his story. Meanwhile, Simms and Fabienne have an affair, while Willy falls for Louise, one of the few women in the McMahon clan, who spurns his advances and is clearly only interested in learning where they have hidden their money. A man named I.G. Farben, who claims to be a house developer, enters town with his wife Sonia and introduces himself, but quickly disappears, leaving a suitcase of machine guns for Norwood, Simms, and Willy. The next morning, Simms sees Mr. Dade's car enter the town, and tries to get a drunken Willy and Norwood to leave with Velma.

George, already angry over Fabienne being unfaithful, kills Angel-Eyes for making sexual advances her, and the three hitmen are blamed. A series of shootouts begin between the townspeople, Mr. Dade's crew, and the hitmen. Frank joins Mr. Dade's team, and everyone begins to turn against each other. Willy seeks Louise, hoping she'll join his side, but instead she shoots him, though he manages to crawl away, badly wounded. As Simms and Willy run into the desert, a shootout ensues with the town priest. They reach the spot where they buried the money, and, after recovering it, Simms shoots the wounded Willy. Simms in turn is shot by Velma. Frank and Velma then take off arm-in-arm with the suitcase of money, while Simms and Willy die.

Meanwhile, in town, chaos has ensued, and the store is set on fire, with Norwood and Fabienne inside. They miraculously survive and shoot Mr. Dade and his cronies. Eventually virtually everyone is killed, aside from Norwood and several female characters. Frank and Velma leave the town in a truck with the suitcase full of money, but accidentally drive off of a cliff when their brakes go out, killing both in a fiery explosion. Norwood leaves town with the women, and Farben Oil Company trucks enter the town to drill for oil.

== Cast ==
- Dick Rude as Willy
- Sy Richardson as Norwood
- Courtney Love as Velma
- Joe Strummer as Simms
- Miguel Sandoval as George
- Jennifer Balgobin as Fabienne
- Sara Sugarman as Chuch
- Biff Yeager as Frank McMahon
- Shane MacGowan as Bruno McMahon
- Spider Stacy as Angel Eyes McMahon
- Terry Woods as Tom McMahon
- Xander Berkeley as Preacher McMahon
- Cait O'Riordan as Slim McMahon
- Kathy Burke as Sabrina
- Elvis Costello as Hives, The Butler
- Del Zamora as Poncho
- Edward Tudor-Pole as Rusty Zimmerman
- Dennis Hopper as IG Farben
- Jim Jarmusch as Amos Dade
- Grace Jones as Sonya
- Graham Fletcher-Cook as Whitey and His Twin Brother Jeeves
- Anne-Marie Ruddock as Molly
- Zander Schloss as Karl
- Fox Harris as Kim Blousson

== Production ==
=== Development ===
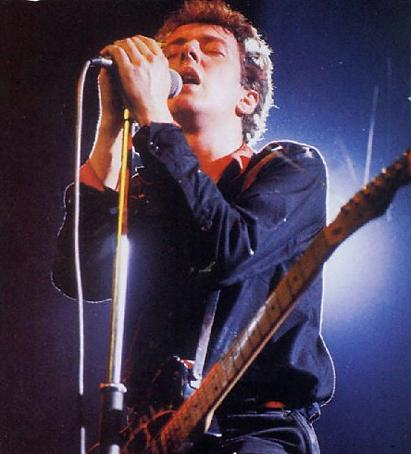
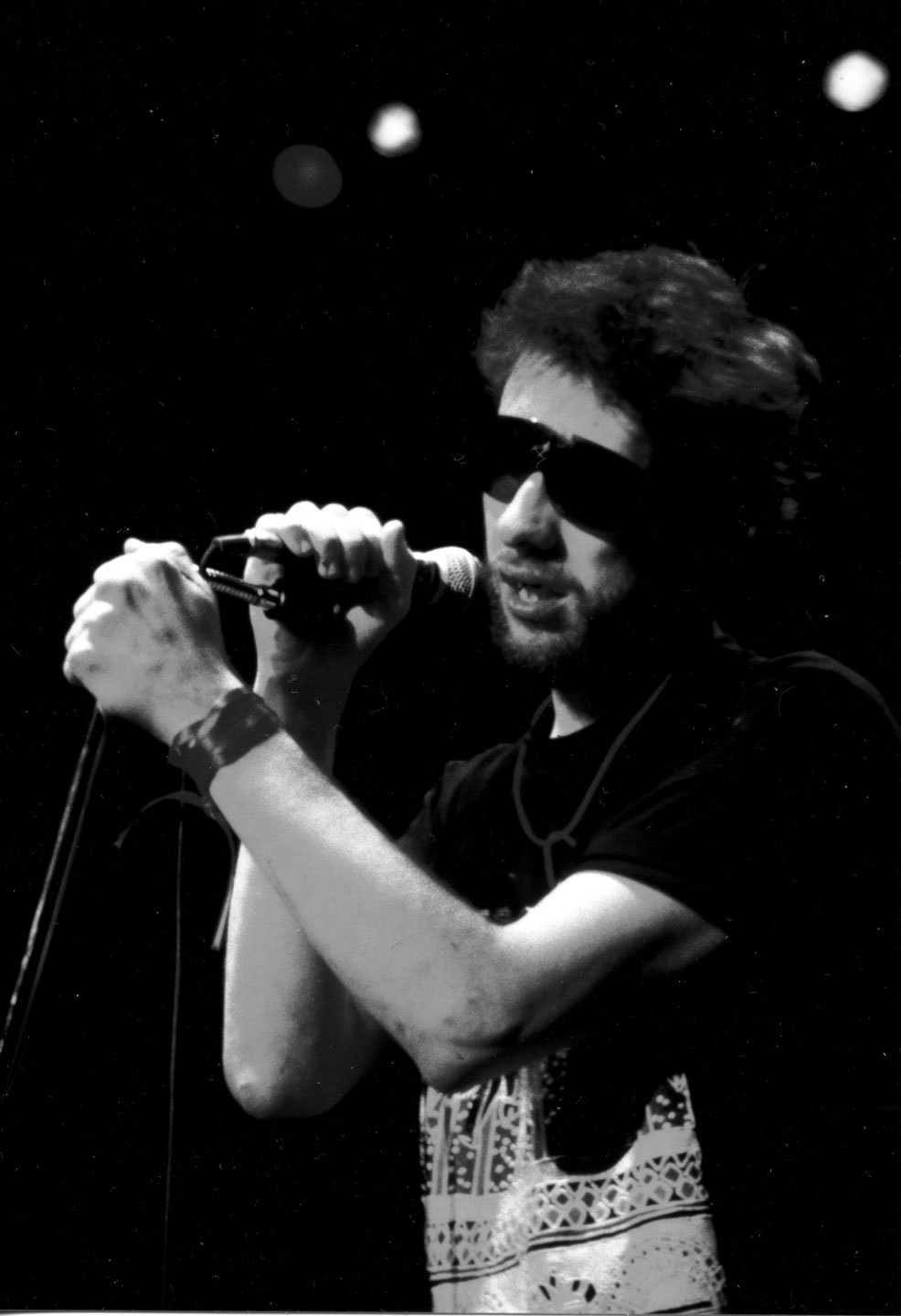
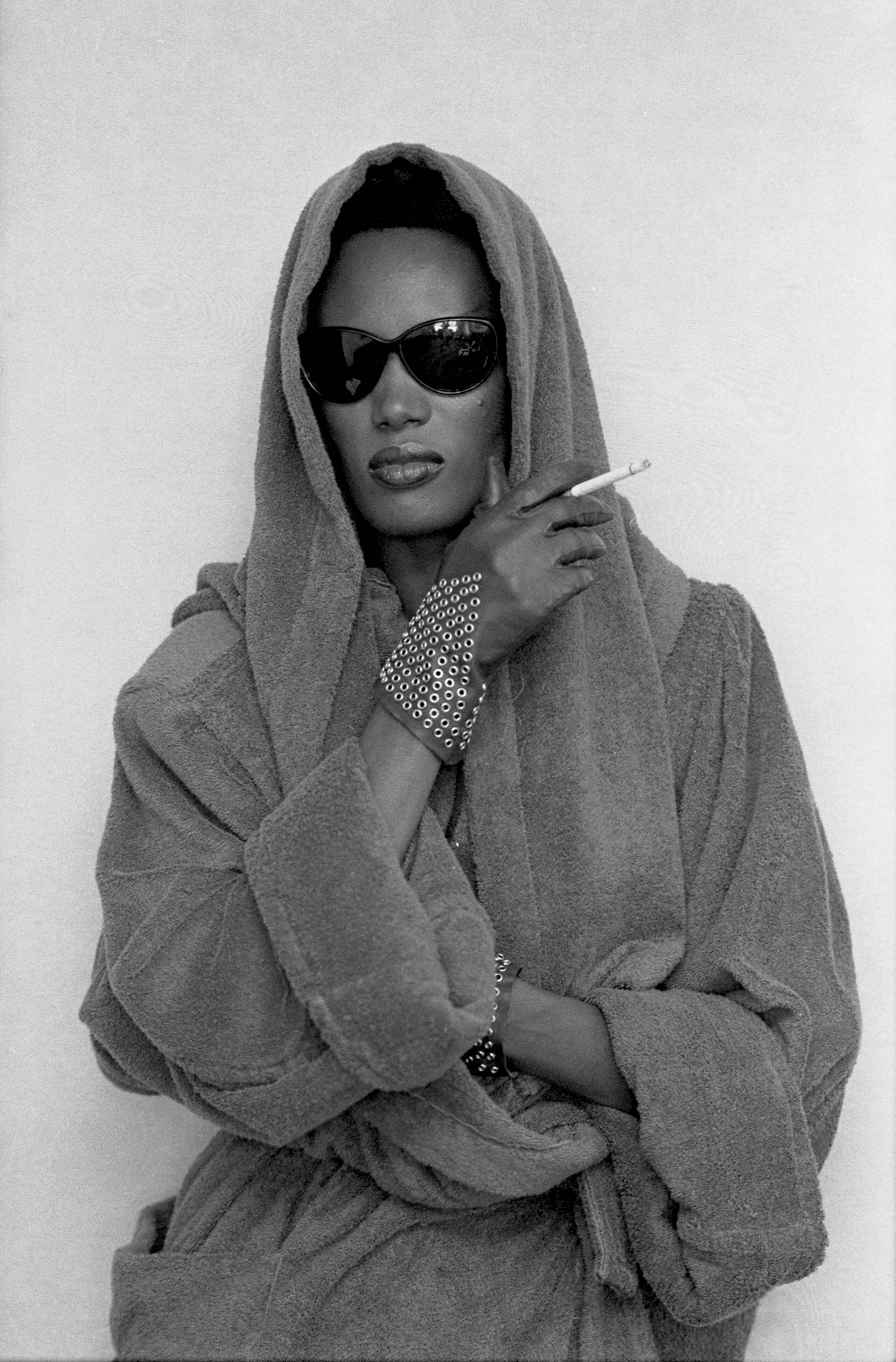
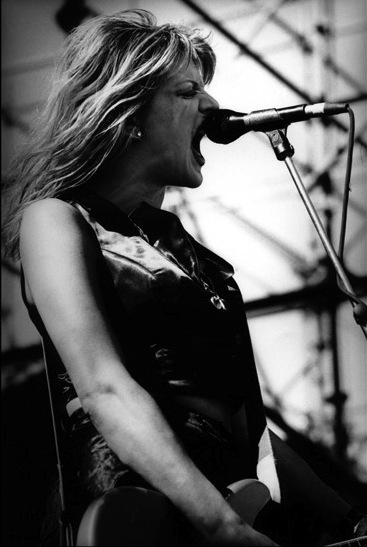
The film features multiple musicians, including (clockwise, left to right): Joe Strummer, Shane MacGowan, Courtney Love, and Grace Jones

Straight to Hell was developed by writer-director Alex Cox after a preponderance of musicians and bands—among them Joe Strummer, The Pogues—had gathered to perform a concert tour of Nicaragua. Political problems arose concerning the support of the left-wing government of Nicaragua, and the tour was cancelled. As an alternative, Cox invited the bands, and several actors he could assemble, to make a movie in Spain. Cox and co-star Dick Rude wrote a script over three days in December 1986, loosely basing it on the spaghetti Western Django Kill... If You Live, Shoot! (1967), directed by Giulio Questi. Cox described it as an "homage" to Questi's film. Cox turned down the chance to direct Three Amigos in order to make Straight to Hell.

Cox wrote the part of Velma specifically for Courtney Love, who had appeared in a supporting role in his previous film, Sid and Nancy (1986). Love modeled the character after Carroll Baker's performance in the 1956 film Baby Doll.

=== Filming ===
A co-production between the United Kingdom and the United States, Straight to Hell was filmed over four weeks on location in Almería, Andalusia, Spain, beginning on 4 August 1986. The production budget was approximately $1 million. Principal photography began at the Gran Hotel Almería, before moving to Benahadux and the Pueblos Blancos.

The Western town featured in the film was located in the Tabernas Desert, and had originally been used for the 1973 film Chino starring Charles Bronson.

Production of the film was troubled, as funds provided by Eric Fellner of Island Pictures ran out approximately midway through filming. As a result, the remainder of the film was financed using traveller's cheques and credit cards.

On an episode of comicbook on IG, both John Cusack and Tim Robbins claimed they had been cast in the film, went to Spain to shoot, but were fired because they refused to shave their heads because of upcoming work.

== Soundtrack ==
The soundtrack for the film was composed of all new, original music composed and performed mostly by the musicians who acted in the film, with contributions from The Pogues and Pray for Rain. However, the original 1987 soundtrack release contained only some of the music from the film. The complete soundtrack was not released until 2004, under the new title Straight to Hell Returns.

Straight to Hell

Soundtrack album
- Released: 1987
- Genre: Soundtrack
- Length: 34:45
- Label: Off the Track

=== Track listing (original) ===
No.	Title	Writer(s)	Performed by	Length
1.	"The Good, the Bad and the Ugly"	Ennio Morricone	The Pogues	3:45
2.	"Rake at the Gates of Hell"	Shane MacGowan	The Pogues	2:22
3.	"If I Should Fall from Grace with God"	Shane MacGowan	The Pogues	2:41
4.	"Rabinga"	Shane MacGowan	The Pogues	2:21
5.	"Evil Darling"	Joe Strummer	Joe Strummer	5:07
6.	"Big Nothing"	Elvis Costello	The Macmanus Gang	5:47
7.	"Money, Guns and Coffee"	Dan Wool	Pray for Rain	4:08
8.	"Ambush at the Mystery Rock"	Joe Strummer	Joe Strummer	3:32
9.	"Salsa y Ketchup"	Zander Schloss, Joe Strummer, Miguel Sandoval	Zander Schloss	2:23
10.	"The Killers (Main Title Theme)"	Dan Wool	Pray for Rain	2:56
11.	"Danny Boy"	Fred Weatherly	The Pogues feat. Cait O'Riordan and the cast	1:43
Total length:				34:45

Straight to Hell Returns

Soundtrack album
- Released: 2004
- Genre: Soundtrack
- Label: Big Beat Records

=== Track listing (expanded release) ===
No.	Title	Writer(s)	Performed by	Length
1.	"Evil Darling"	Joe Strummer	Joe Strummer	5:02
2.	"Long Cool Day in Hell"	Jem Finer	The Pogues	1:26
3.	"The Killers [Main Title]"	Dan Wool	Pray For Rain	2:00
4.	"Three Deadly Cars"	Dan Wool	Pray For Rain	1:12
5.	"Spoils"	Dan Wool	Pray For Rain	1:54
6.	"Bolero Del Perro Listo [aka Bolero]"	James Fearnley	The Pogues	2:53
7.	"Fabienne"		Miguel Sandoval; Dialogue Track – Courtney Love	0:32
8.	"Night on Bald Mountain"	Modest Mussorgsky, arranged by James Fearnley	The Pogues	1:51
9.	"Blood Sausage"	Dan Wool	Zander Schloss	0:44
10.	"Ambush at Mystery Rock"	Joe Strummer	Joe Strummer	3:32
11.	"Harmonicas"	The Pogues	The Pogues	2:20
12.	"Widdle Binky Boo"	Dan Wool, Zander Schloss	Zander Schloss	1:03
13.	"Rabinga"	Philip Chevron	The Pogues, feat. Del Zamora	2:17
14.	"Big Question Mark"	Jem Finer	The Pogues	1:35
15.	"L'Amoria"	Philip Chevron	The Pogues	2:09
16.	"Obsession"	Jem Finer	The Pogues	1:18
17.	"Salsa y Ketchup"	Joe Strummer, Miguel Sandoval, Zander Schloss	Zander Schloss; Dialogue Track – Ed Pansullo	2:43
18.	"Quiet Day in Blanco Town"	Jem Finer	The Pogues	1:48
19.	"Sadistic Sausage"	Dan Wool	Zander Schloss	0:31
20.	"If I Should Fall From Grace With God"	Shane MacGowan	The Pogues	2:37
21.	"Danny Boy"	Fred Weatherly	The Pogues feat. Cait O'Riordan	1:43
22.	"Insipid Sausage"	Dan Wool, Zander Schloss, with Lauren Carter (oboe)	Zander Schloss and Pray For Rain	0:35
23.	"Shoot Out"	Dan Wool	Pray For Rain	1:25
24.	"Fan Out"	Dan Wool	Pray For Rain	1:04
25.	"Big Nothing"	Declan MacManus	The MacManus Gang	5:46
26.	"Taranta Del Fuente"	James Fearnley, Jem Finer	The Pogues, dialogue Track – Biff Yeager, Courtney Love	1:14
27.	"High Fives"	Dan Wool	Zander Schloss	0:51
28.	"Rake at the Gates of Hell [End Titles]"	Shane MacGowan	The Pogues	2:25

== Release ==
Straight to Hell was theatrically released in the United Kingdom on 12 June 1987. In the United States, the film opened in New York City on 26 June 1987, followed by a California premiere at the Pickwick Drive-In in Burbank on 1 July 1987. Invitees to the Pickwick screening were asked to come dressed in "post-apocalyptic fiesta garb," and guests in attendance were given complementary water pistols. Star Hopper was in attendance, along with Emilio Estevez, Buck Henry, Shelley Duvall, and Ed Harris.

The film's premiere was a fiasco, and several people at the drive-in left midway into the movie. Courtney Love was reportedly visibly upset at the premiere.

In the US Straight to Hell was rated "R" for violence and language. The latter reason caught the producers by surprise, as the writers deliberately refrained from including any sort of profanity in the dialogue. Even the word "hell" appears only in the title (at one point a character quite noticeably says "what the heck is going on here?"), and the insults that fly before a showdown are no worse than "go boil yer head!"

=== Home media ===
Anchor Bay Entertainment released Straight to Hell on DVD in 2001.

==== 2010 director's cut ====
In 2010, Microcinema DVD announced a new director's cut, dubbed Straight to Hell Returns. The new version features a new HD transfer, color correction that changes the look of the film, new effects, and new footage. Blood and additional violence during the shootout scenes was digitally implemented into the film which had not been there prior. Cox stated that he was inspired to revisit the film by Francis Ford Coppola's Apocalypse Now Redux. The DVD was released on 14 December 2010.

Leading up to the DVD release, Straight to Hell Returns was screened at several arthouse theaters across the United States and Canada in October and November 2010. In 2018, Kino Lorber re-released the director's cut on DVD and Blu-ray.

== Reception ==
=== Box office ===
Straight to Hell grossed $210,200 at the box office.

=== Critical response ===
The film was not well received by critics, drawing mostly negative reviews. In her review for The New York Times, Janet Maslin wrote, "The result is a mildly engrossing, instantly forgettable midnight movie." Hal Hinson, in his review for The Washington Post, wrote, "The action is so gratuitous, and so indifferently presented, that it's impossible to think that Cox ever truly intended it to be seen by anyone outside of the cast and crew and their immediate families."

Roger Ebert of the Chicago Sun-Times gave the film 1.5 stars out of a possible 4. He wrote: "After "Repo Man" and "Sid and Nancy," I believed that [Cox] could scarcely do wrong, and that there was a streak of obsession in his genius that might well carry him into the pantheon. Since then I have seen Cox's "Straight to Hell," and I must report that he is human after all. I still anticipate his next film. I still think he has a special gift. But "Straight to Hell" is an indulgent mess...'

On the review aggregator website Rotten Tomatoes, 27% of 11 critics' reviews are positive, with an average rating of 4.1/10.

=== Accolades ===
Straight to Hell received the Critics' Prize at the 1987 Madrid Film Festival, where Sergio Leone served as a jury member that year.

== Sources ==
- Davies, Steven Paul (2000). Alex Cox: Film Anarchist. London, England: Batsford. ISBN 978-0-713-48670-4.
