= Colestin, Oregon =

Unincorporated community in the state of Oregon, United States

- Unincorporated community
- Location within Oregon Location within the United States
- Coordinates: 42°03′11″N 122°39′04″W
- Country: United States
- State: Oregon
- County: Jackson
- Elevation: 3,720 ft (1,130 m)
- Time zone: UTC-8 (Pacific (PST))
  - Summer (DST): UTC-7 (PDT)
- GNIS feature ID: 1639299
- Coordinates and elevation from Geographic Names Information System

Colestin is an unincorporated community in Jackson County, Oregon, United States. It is 2.5 miles (4.0 km) west of Siskiyou Pass and 10 miles (16 km) south-southeast of Ashland along Colestin Road, which connects to Interstate 5 via Mount Ashland Road. Colestin is adjacent to part of the Klamath National Forest in the Siskiyou Mountains.

The community is named after Byron Cole, who with his brother settled a donation land claim straddling the Oregon–California border and established a stagecoach station called Cole's. After selling his interest in the station in 1859, Byron Cole acquired land and a mineral spring further north. In 1883, anticipating completion of a railroad between the two states, he built a hotel at the site. In August that year, a post office was established there and named White Point. Ed J. Farlow was the first postmaster and Cole the second. In 1892, the post office name was changed to Colestin, and it operated under that name until closing in 1943.

The change in the post office name was preceded by construction of a Southern Pacific (SP) railway station at this location. In 1887, the SP had leased the Oregon and California Railroad line, which had extended as far south as Ashland by 1884. The SP then completed the line, connecting it to existing SP tracks in northern California. A railway timetable from that era lists Hornbrook as the next station south of Cole's on the SP's Mt. Shasta Route between Portland and San Francisco.
