= Tod Davies =

American screenwriter

Tod Davies (born 1955) is an American writer, publisher and producer.

== Biography ==
Davies was born and grew up in San Francisco, where she attended Convent of the Sacred Heart High School (California). She graduated from the University of California.

Davies's screenplay credits include Three Businessmen, in which she also appears briefly as an actress; and as a co-writer for the screenplay of the adaptation of Hunter S. Thompson's novel Fear and Loathing in Las Vegas. Although Davies's husband Alex Cox did not direct the project, the Writers Guild of America twice determined that their script be credited.

She is the producer of Three Businessmen and Revengers Tragedy, the founder of Toxteth TV, an educational/media studio for young people, based in Liverpool, and the editor/publisher of the online magazine, Exterminating Angel Press. In 2005, she was Artist in Residence at St John's College, Oxford, and is a member of the Senior Common Room there. In 2009, Exterminating Angel Press became an independent press and published three books including The Supergirls by Mike Madrid, and Jam Today, a cooking memoir & the first book by Davies.

Davies published her first book of fiction, Snotty Saves the Day: The History of Arcadia in 2011. The second book of her History of Arcadia series, Lily the Silent, was released in 2012, both through Exterminating Angel Press. Publishers Weekly described Lily the Silent as an "absorbing salute to the necessity and power of storytelling".

In 2014 she published her second book on cookery, Jam Today Too: The Revolution Will Not Be Catered, with 70 recipes and personal stories.

Davies is the wife of film director Alex Cox. She lives in Colestin, Oregon and Boulder, Colorado.

== Exterminating Angel Press ==
Davies founded the independent book publisher, Exterminating Angel Press (EAP), which grew from an online art project started in 2005. EAP set out "to challenge the received cultural narrative". They also include stories that bring out values of partnership, nurturing and finding a consensus rather than having one dominant point of view. By the Fall of 2013 EAP had published 13 books. Davies launched an Indiegogo fundraising campaign to raise $7,500 to continue her publishing venture.

== Books by Davies ==
- Jam Today: A Diary of Cooking With What You’ve Got by Tod Davies (September 2009).
- Snotty Saves the Day: The History of Arcadia by Tod Davies (April 2011).
- Lily the Silent: The History of Arcadia by Tod Davies and illustrated by Mike Madrid (October 2012).
- Jam Today Too: The Revolution Will Not Be Catered by Tod Davies (June 2014).
