= Russia's War: Blood upon the Snow =

Television documentary series

Russia's War: Blood upon the Snow is a ten-part British-Russian television documentary series that explores the involvement of the Soviet Union in World War 2 while under Joseph Stalin's reign of terror, highlighting the suffering of the general population, members of the Red Army and anyone that Stalin thought might pose a threat to his power.

The series was released in 1995, not long after the collapse of the Soviet Union in 1991, an event that allowed Western and Russian historians access to formerly secret Soviet archives for the first time so that the events on the Eastern Front could be better explained to Western audiences.

The series is narrated by English actor Nigel Hawthorne and the credits name "Professor Richard Overy", "Professor Dmitri Volkogonov" and "Professor Mikhail Semyryaga" as Historical Consultants. Although Volkogonov did publish books on Soviet history and had extensive access to the archives, it appears that the title "Professor" is honorary as it appears he did not work at a university.

== Episodes ==
No.	Title
1	"The Darkness Descends"
After the death of Vladimir Lenin in 1924, the leading characters among the Bolsheviks were Leon Trotsky and Joseph Stalin. Before he died, Lenin wrote a review of the key party figures and in a postscript made a "damning condemnation of Stalin's character" and suggested that he be removed from the post of General Secretary of the Communist Party. Most of the delegates at the 13th Party Congress were unaware of Lenin's assessment and so no action was taken and from there he set about to consolidate his power. Immediately after Lenin's death, there is optimism among the population for the "new dawn of Socialism" but the reality will be very different. Over the course of his 30 years in power, Stalin will annihilate 20 million Soviet citizens by shooting, starvation and slave labor. Stalin's biographer, Volkogonov, says that he craved power and fame, "but he liked power the most" so he eliminated possible rivals. Trotsky is deported while Nikolai Bukharin is forced to make a public confession of his errors. Meanwhile, Italy is already Fascist, Japan is expanding its control in East Asia and the Nazis are a national party. The collectivization of agriculture began in 1928 and over subsequent years, resulted in famines that killed millions while millions more were deported to labor camps with hundreds of thousands kulaks, or land-owning peasants, executed for resisting. In the Ukraine alone, perhaps 5 million died in the famine known as the Holodomor. Stalin distrusted Jews and created a Jewish autonomous zone in the far east but most elected to stay in Ukraine and Byelorussia instead, little knowing that would be their downfall when the Nazis invade. The first Five-Year Plan which demands a massive expansion of industry, is published in 1928. It is assumed that failure to meet targets must be the result of sabotage by internal enemies so the Shakhty Trial was a warning. One of the grand projects in the plan built by slave labor was the White Sea Canal. The forced-labor camps expand all over the Soviet Union and become the Gulag. In 1931, the Japanese invade Manchuria, arguably opening World War II and placing Japanese forces on the Soviet border. In 1933, the Nazis come to power in Germany. Their leader, Adolf Hitler says that German destiny lies in taking Lebensraum, or "living space", to the east, much of it within the Soviet Union and yet the Soviets continued training German pilots and tank commanders, something that was prohibited at home under the Treaty of Versailles. At the 1934 Party Congress, Stalin apparently commands complete loyalty but in a secret vote for who will lead the party, there are 3 votes against Sergei Kirov but 300 against Stalin. Stalin's paranoia leads him to a Great Purge of anyone whose loyalty is in doubt and a majority of the delegates will later be murdered, including Kirov. Grigory Zinoviev, Lev Kamenev and Nikolai Bukharin were tried in show trials and executed. Stalin orders that the symbolic Cathedral of Christ the Saviour be demolished. Despite Germany's open rearmament and designs on the lands to the east, Stalin initiates a purge in the Soviet armed forces that leads to the assassination of Mikhail Tukhachevsky, Marshal of the Red Army and nearly half of the military command staff including Vitaly Primakov in 1937.
2	"The Hour Before Midnight"
In 1936, German forces occupied the Rhineland in defiance of the Treaty of Versailles. In the same year, Germany and Japan signed an anti-communist pact. Stalin now fears Western powers and any influence they might have on Soviet citizens so a visit by the American cruiser Augusta and four destroyers in 1937 was followed by mass arrests of Soviet naval personnel who were accused of becoming spies. All sectors of Soviet life now had to meet Stalin's approval, even non-political scientists and geneticist Nikolai Vavilov was arrested and sentenced to death. In 1938, Molotov proposes a list of new ministers to the Supreme Soviet. "Within 2 years of their appointments, they are all under arrest, executed, or disappeared." After the Spanish Civil War breaks out, the Soviets send military aid to the Republicans while Germany augments Italy's substantial aid to the forces of General Franco. The war is used to test new weaponry and Soviet support for the Republicans encourages some Westerner's such as Kim Philby to join the cause. Soviet diplomats attempt to form an alliance with the British and French but Stalin mistrusts the west and there are no results. Germany annexes Austria in March 1938 with local public support. Hitler then demands that the Sudetenland, the German-speaking parts of Czechoslovakia, be allowed to join Germany. With the Munich Agreement in September, Britain and France avoid war by giving Hitler what he says he wants but then in early 1939, German forces occupy the rest of the country. Days later, Germany demands the Memel territory from Lithuania and lacking outside assistance, they were in no position to refuse. It was then apparent that Germany's next move was the invasion of Poland and with the Treaty of Versailles now irrelevant, there was little incentive for Russia to help Poland defend its borders. Stalin instead considers a division of Poland. However, there was good news from the east as General Zhukov, in his first major command, defeated Japanese forces in the Battles of Khalkhin Gol in Auuest 1939 on the disputed border with Japanese-controlled Manchuria. With the cease-fire signed in September, Stalin was free to move troops west. Molotov becomes Foreign Minister in May 1939, and in a move that will stun the world, signs the Molotov–Ribbentrop Pact with his German counterpart on 23 August that publicly promises non-aggression between the two countries. Secretly however, it divides Poland in a coming invasion from both sides and Germany indicates it will recognize Russian rule over the Baltic states. In response to this and Hitler's violation of the Munich Agreements, Britain signs a military alliance with Poland two days later promising to go to war if it is attacked. It was hoped that this would signal to Hitler that he would no longer be appeased. German forces invaded Poland on 1 September, the first instance of a "Blitzkrieg" attack. On the 3rd Britain declares war on Germany, followed within hours by France. Soviet forces then begin their attack from the east. In the months that follow, anti-communists, priests and army officers are arrested. In particular, the Soviet secret police, the NKVD, massacre thousands at Katyn Forest, a massacre that was denied throughout the Soviet era but recently revealed Soviet archives make it undeniable. In November 1939, Soviet forces invade Finland but initially the much smaller Finish forces repel the attacks exposing the effect of Stalin's purges of army leadership and leading Hitler to conclude that the Soviet Union is vulnerable. Soviet cooperation with Germany extends to sending grain and oil and Stalin returns German communists that fled to Moscow. Although Britain and France had declare war on Germany, there was little actual fighting - a Phoney War. Then in May 1940 German forces bypassed France's defensive Maginot Line by attacking through the Ardennes to capture Luxemburg, Belgium and The Netherlands before invading France. Winston Churchill becomes Prime Minister as German forces prove unstoppable. 330,00 British and French soldiers are evacuated from Dunkirk. When France fell, Hitler insisted on signing the armistice agreement in the same car in which Germany had surrendered at the end of World War I. With the annexation of Estonia, Latvia and Lithuania, plus a large portion of Poland, the Soviet Union now controls 175,000 square miles of territory and 20 million people, thousands of whom are shot and tens of thousands more sent to forced labor camps. Although Germany had attempted to get Japan to commit to joining its fight with the western powers, Japan preferred to avoid direct engagement and signed a neutrality pact with the Soviets in April 1941. Stalin knows that his credibility will be lost if Germany attacks but he now has no allies, internal or external, and he refuses to accept the possibility. Germany is forging ahead with preparations and Britain sends intercepted intelligence to Moscow warning of attack. Soviet spies confirm this information with the network in Switzerland even giving the date of 22 June. Richard Sorge in Japan confirms it. Even when members of the Soviet forces at the border report a German build-up, Beria, the head of the NKVD, has them arrested for spreading false information. On the eve of the invasion, Stalin rejects requests from Zhukov and Timoshenko to relocated Soviet forces at the border to more defensible positions. A German defector, Alfred Liskow swims across the river to warn the Soviets that the invasion will start in 5 hours time but like the others, his information ignored. Stalin will not acknowledge that he has "disastrously miscalculated".
3	"The Goths Ride East"
After 6 months of Blitzkrieg warfare, German troops are now within 20 miles (32km) of Moscow. Hundreds of thousands of Red Army soldiers have already died and another million are wounded and many more are now prisoners of war. On 21 June 1941, 3 million German troops along a front stretching from the Baltic to the Black Sea are moved into final position while Soviet citizens are completely ignorant of what is to come. At midday, Zhukov and Timoshenko request an emergency meeting with Stalin and plead for permission to issue an alert to troops on the border but Stalin refuses, still disbelieving that Hitler will betray him. Early the following morning, German forces invade along the full length of the western frontier. Zhukov telephones Stalin but it is 3 minutes before an aide answers. When Stalin eventually comes to the phone, Zhukov tells Stalin of the invasion and requests permission to return fire but is initially met with silence. Wasting further time, he tells Zhukov to meet him at the Kremlin but refuses to authorize defensive fire. At the meeting, Stalin says the reports must be wrong or if they are true, then it must be a German provocation organized without Hitler's consent and so still does not authorize the Red Army to return fire. Stalin orders Molotov to determine if the war is real; Molotov sees foreign press reports and it is only when that he reports back to Stalin that he finally gives the order to return fire. Too embarrassed by his failure, Stalin directs Molotov to tell the Soviet people of the unfolding catastrophe, 8 hours after it began. On the first day, 1,200 Soviet aircraft are destroyed. Red Army units and civilians make retreat in panic. Rather than stay at the Kremlin to direct the response, Stalin isolates himself at his dacha outside Moscow. Molotov and other members of the Politburo came to the dacha, pleading with him to take control. Years later, Stalin confides that he thought they had come to demand his resignation. On 3 July, 11 days after the invasion began, Stalin addresses the nation. Despite the disasters of collectivization, the purges the military leadership and the country's intelligencia, the shooting or internment in forced labor camps of hundreds of thousands of citizens, he now calls on the people to fight a Great Patriotic War. He claims that many German elite units have already been destroyed giving the impression that the struggle will last only a month or so. In Ukraine, German forces are greeted by many as liberators, a natural reaction to the millions of deaths that Stalin's policies had caused since he came to power. Posters and statues of Stalin are destroyed. Back at the Kremlin, Stalin now seeks scapegoats for his failures. First is General Pavlov, a Hero of the Soviet Union and commander of the western front. He had impending danger and pleaded for permission to reposition his forces to more defensible positions but was refused. At trial, he defends his actions but is sentenced to death, then shot. The Red Army garrison at Brest, in Byelorussia, puts up a fierce resistance for a month until finally being compelled to surrender. Hitler is so impressed by their determination that he has only a single survivor shot and he visits the site with Mussolini holding it up as an example for their own troops. To Stalin though, they are not heroes and after the repatriation of prisoners after the war, the survivors are sent to the Gulag. With German forces advancing up to 50 miles (80km) per day with no sign of slowing down, the Soviets consider seeking peace and called in Bulgarian ambassador, Ivan Stamenov to make contact with Berlin. He reacts with incredulity saying, "Even if you have to retreat all the way to the Urals, you will still beat Hitler". To discourage surrender, Stalin issues Order 270 which says that all officers and political officials taken prisoner will be executed if they return to the Soviet Union. Further, their families are also subject to arrest and deportation to the Gulag. When Moscow comes within range of German bombers, defences are set up in the city but Luftwaffe gets through and bombs the city, sending its residents into the subway for shelter. German Army Group North heads towards Leningrad (now Saint Petersburg) while Army Group Center encircles Smolensk and Army Group South heads for Kiev. Stalin repeatedly overrules expert advice from his generals resulting in the unnecessary sacrifice of countless Soviet troops. At the beginning of August, German forces are poised to surround Kiev. General Kirponos wants to retreat to avoid capture, a move supported by Zhukov. Stalin instead orders that the city be saved at any cost. In the ensuing battle for Kiev, four Soviet armies are destroyed - Kirponos is killed, hundreds of thousands are taken prisoner and a vast amount of equipment is seized. The city falls on 18 September. As the Germans push north toward Leningrad, Tallinn in Estonia falls after a strong fight. The remaining Soviet forces evacuate by sea but without air cover, lose 16 warships, 34 transports and thousands of men. The Luftwaffe start bombing the city and by the end of September, Leningrad is under siege, cut off with no land link to the rest of the country. Stalin orders Zhukov to take direct command of the city's defense. At this time, Hitler launches Operation Typhoon, the battle for Moscow which involves 1.8 million men on the German side. With disaster looming, Zhukov is summoned again and asked to provide a full assessment. On 10 October, Zhukov reports back to Stalin with news that Moscow was essentially defenseless but that the main part of the German army was pinned down dealing with Red Army forces to the northwest of Vyazma (between Smolensk and Moscow). Stalin blames General Konev as commander of the western front and orders Zhukov to take over. Zhukov defends Konev, saving him from execution. Zhukov has just 90,000 troops at his disposal to defend the western front, down from 800,000 just weeks earlier - by now the Germans have taken 3 million captive. The city's population will have to take part in its own defense so they dig trenches, fill sandbags and form a civilian militia of 450,000 made up of those too young, too old or too feeble to be drafted into the regular army. They are ill-prepared. Certain that it is about to fall, the Soviet government flees the capital on 16 October to Kuibyshev (now Samara) causing panic in the civilian population. Stalin elects to stay. German forces advancing toward Moscow encounter unexpected resistance as 28 men led by General Panfilov make a last stand that blocked the advance of 50 tanks giving extra time for the defenders to prepare. It is later revealed that Zhukov told Panfilov that he would be shot if he surrendered. By late October, the front is along the Moscow-Volga Canal. The weather now turns against the Germans with the first snows melting and turning unpaved ground to mud. On 2 December, German units reach the anti-tank defenses set up by Moscow citizens, 17 miles (27km) from the center of Moscow at which point the city is within range of their heavy artillery but bitter cold sets in for which the Germans are not equipped. They now have only days left if they are to capture Moscow.
4	"Between Life and Death"
By late autumn, the Soviet Union appears on the brink of collapse. Stalin calls Marshal Rokossovsky whose army was just to the west of the city and orders him to retake Krasnaya Polyana from where German artillery is able to strike all of Moscow. That counterattack is successful and two 300mm guns are captured. On 6 November, the 25th anniversary of the revolution, Stalin gives a speech to the military and Party elite in the Mayakovskaya subway station. The following day at the military parade in Red Square, Stalin gives a speech to troops claiming that Germany cannot sustain its advances and will collapse within 6 months to a year. Troops march directly to the front as the Germans are about to start what they believe will be the final offensive to take Moscow though some commanders worry that they are unprepared for a winter campaign that was no foreseen. Meanwhile, Leningrad is still holding out despite being surrounded on land, bombed from the air and attacked with heavy artillery. Stalin is not committed to saving the city and so residents are part of the city's defense. Heavy snow and bitter cold cause transport systems to shut down and water pipes to burst. The lack of fuel results in residents burning their furniture and anything else they can find to stay alive. By November and December, many were dying of starvation. Cemeteries were overwhelmed through the winter and so on 7 March 1942, a decision was made to cremate bodies at the brick factory and 223,000 bodies were burned there. By August (1942), 1.2 million deaths were officially registered but one interview says that the true figure was more like 2 million. Unsurprisingly, there was some cannibalism, most often by women desperate to continue caring for their surviving children. Despite the suffering, the intense cold makes the ice on Lake Ladoga so thick that limited supplies can be brought in by truck from the eastern shore, which was still in Soviet hands, while evacuating some women and children - the Road of Life. At the beginning of 1942, the situation is desperate. The Party calls in historian Dmitry Likhachov to write a book to inspire those left and the result is "Defense of the Old Russian Cities". Architect Alexander Nikolsky (see Constructivist architecture) set to work on a triumphal arch. Dmitri Shostakovich completes the Leningrad Symphony that will first be performed in the city. Musicians are recalled from the front but conductor Karl Eliasberg has to cope with some of them dying, or approaching death, during rehearsals. The Leningrad premiere is a great success in boosting morale. Thousands of children are killed in the siege. Schoolgirl Tanya Savicheva keeps a diary documenting the horrors she sees that is later read at the Nuremberg trials. The city returns to life in the spring but since nearly all the men are away fighting, almost all the work is done by women. The tram network is revived and crops are grown on every piece of available land. When the ice melts on Lake Ladoga, a pipeline is laid under the lake to supply fuel and the trucks bringing supplies are replaced by boats. More women and children are evacuated but many fall victim to air attack before reaching they can disembark. Leningrad will not surrender now. Meanwhile outside Moscow, resistance continues into the winter and the German offensive is halted. A counter-offensive is planned. Spy Richard Sorje, in Tokyo, gets a message back to Moscow saying that the Japanese will not attack from Manchuria, allowing half of Soviet forces there - 17 fully-armed and equipped divisions - to be rushed west. For the first time, Stalin allows his generals under Zhukov full control to properly prepare. On 5 December 1941, the counter-offensive begins. Hitler has underestimated Soviet reserves and resolve so now it is the Germans on the defensive. The Soviets now have control of the air, the new, powerful T-34 tank is deployed in force and is designed to work in the worst weather; Infantry advance swiftly on skis. Although German generals attempt an orderly retreat - On 20 December, General Guderian informs Hitler that his troops can no longer fight - Hitler overrules them and demands that their positions must be defended. After 6 months of fighting, the German Army Group Center is smashed. With this victory, Soviet morale soars and now Stalin orders continuous attacks along the whole front, throwing all reserves into battle. By now though, Soviet troops are exhausted and dispersed so the advance falters. However, it is now clear that the Red Army is not beaten and the Germans are not invincible. Moscow celebrates the New Year, out of immediate danger but the cost has been terrible: by February, the Red Army has lost almost a million troops, information that is kept secret for half a century. The retreating Germans destroy everything of value, especially symbols of Slavic culture. Tchaikovsky's house in Klin is wrecked and the score of his 6th Symphony burned. The Germans used the house of Tolstoy as a barracks but burned it down as they left. Russian Orthodox churches, and the icons inside them, are destroyed. Many churches are the sites of mass-murders where Germans assembled local people before killing them. As the Red Army pushes the Nazis back from territories they have occupied, the atrocities they committed are visible for the world to see. Large numbers of Germans are taken prisoner and their equipment is abandoned. British Foreign Minister Eden comes to the former battlefield to see for himself. America has now entered the war and neither they, nor the British, thought that Moscow could hold out. However, although the Germans have lost this battle, the German armed forces overall remain strong. Both Hitler and Stalin demand attacks.
5	"The Fight from Within"
With the German invasion and then partition of Poland in September 1939, thousands of Poles with reason to fear the Nazis - Jews, Communists - flee east. However, with the German invasion of the Soviet Union, they are in danger again as are the populations in the areas they capture - Poles, Ukrainians, Byelorussians and those in the former Baltic republics. Initially the Germans present themselves as liberators, espousing the brutality of Stalin's regime. In their hasty retreat, the NKVD has executed tens of thousands of prisoners and the Germans dig up the mass graves. Some of these are filmed for German audiences. Ukrainians tear down images of Stalin without realizing that they are welcoming a different dictator. Citizens are encouraged to turn in Jews, Communists and anyone that supported the old order. Street parades are held for the Germans with Hitler presented as a saviour and the Bolsheviks as murderers. The Germans encourage nationalist feelings in the areas they now control and without dwelling on Nazi ideology, recruit locals to the SS, a million collaborators in all who will at first fight the remnants of the Red Army. Hitler then changes direction and 70,000 are turned to a campaign of terror against the civilian population. Nazi theories of race were based in part on the pseudoscience of the shape of a person's skull and was the rationale to eliminate Jews, Gypsies and the incurably sick and to clear Slavic people from the lands they capture. Himmler, head of the SS, anticipates the death of 30 million non-Aryan people. SS units under the command of Erich von dem Bach-Zelewski are tasked with killing all the Jews in the occupied territories. Their own records indicate that they murder 700,000. In Kiev, the Einsatzgruppen death squads were active 2 days after German forces captured the city. Jews in the city were rounded up and taken to the ravine at Babi Yar, forced to strip naked, and then are shot. Over 30,000 are killed there, including children, in two days. When the Red Army eventually recaptures the area, they count 125,000 bodies. Himmler visits a concentration camp near Minsk and orders that 100 prisoners are to be shot while he is there. He sees that one of the unlucky people selected has blond hair and blue eyes, and so thinking there is a mistake, questions whether the man is really Jewish. He is and his fate is sealed. Jews not sent away immediately to their death are forced into ghettos in every major occupied city, with the largest being the Minsk ghetto. Few will survive the starvation or the arbitrary murders. None are meant to survive. In Minsk, where the ghetto is under control of Wilhelm Kube, 120,000 bodies were removed from the ghetto and dumped. Before the death camps at Auchwitz, Treblinka and Sobibor are operational, Jews from across Nazi-occupied territories are sent to Minsk. However, it is not just the Jews that are affected as everyone in the occupied territories is under a reign of terror. Children that are ethnically acceptable are taken from their families and sent to Germany for reeducation as "breeding stock". Many more will be held in concentration camps for children where some will be used for medical experiments, older children will be used as forced labor and many will be killed. Hundreds of thousands of Soviet adults are also sent to forced labor camps in Germany. Although prisoners of the Nazis, Stalin will regard those that survive until liberation as collaborators. After expelling or killing the people in territories they captured, German plans saw the creation of four administrative zones: Ostland under Wilhelm Kube, Ukraine under SS General Prützmann, the Kaukasus under Eric Frederiki(?) and Mocovy under General von Rock(?). The Germans seize livestock and grain while Byelorussians and Ukrainians in the cities go hungry. Cooperation with the Germans was, for many, the only way to survive. Although the German propaganda tried to convey friendship between Germans and local population, the truth was different. A woman is interviewed who says she was 16 when the war started and 20 when it ended. She says she and the other people, would hide from the Germans and, "we all tried to look as bad as possible", presumably to discourage rape. The result is that many set up camp deep in the forest where they are relatively safe and can wage a guerilla war against the Germans. Stalin is suspicious of these independent resistance groups and so they receive no assistance. They fight for their homes and land, not for Stalin. Instead, the NKVD sets up its own partisan groups but they act with no consideration of local interests and execute community leaders not under their control. With a renewed German offensive, Stalin agrees to use these units, the Atriadi(?) more extensively so supplies and advisors are air dropped to them. Military command structures are enforced and everyone must swear allegiance to Stalin. Byelorussian partisan leader Ponomarenko as their overall commander. Under him, Kovpak, Feoderov and Grutyenev(?) are to recruit civilians, or if necessary, conscript. By late summer 1942, 150,000 partisans are harassing German forces making it hard for Germany to reap the economic windfall it expected. Since the partisans are hard to catch, the Germans take reprisals on the civilian population with 600 villages being destroyed in Byelorussia alone, their inhabitants either murdered or forced to flee; women have been raped. Working for the resistance, Yelena Mazanik assassinates Wilhelm Kube by placing a bomb under his bed. In retaliation, 1,000 Minsk citizens are hanged. Supplies to partisan bands greatly increases in 1943 and by summer, they are holding down 300,000 German troops. Red Army offensives are co-ordinated with partisan units to blow up railway lines and cut communication lines. However, the official partisan units are also fighting a civil war against nationalist partisans that are trying to rid themselves of both Hitler and Stalin. In the Ukraine, there are 100,000 fighting under Stepan Bandera who are also targeting ethnic Poles. The independent partisans are treated as enemies by all sides and when the Red Army retakes territory, they are executed. The same fate awaits German collaborators and captured Germans.
6	"The Cauldron Boils"
In May 1942, Soviet victories over the winter are reversed at Kharkov and hundreds of thousands of troops are captured in a German counter-offensive. The German victory clears the path for a coming assault on the Caucasus through the mountains where the aim is to take the oil producing centers of Grozny and Baku. Red Army reserves are concentrated around Moscow leaving this area lightly defended so oil fields are sabotaged as the Soviets retreat. However, there is only one good road east to Baku and as Soviet forces fall back, they regroup and block the German advance. Meanwhile, two German armies move towards Stalingrad and Hitler now aims to take the city and cut the Soviets off from the Caucasus. The 6th Army leads the advance, forcing the Red Army back. The Soviet situation is rapidly deteriorating and even Stalin's son is captured (at Smolensk). Stalin will tolerate no further retreats and in July 1942, issues Order No. 227 which makes any unauthorized retreat punishable by execution. "Not one step back", is the motto. The NKVD sets up blocking units with machine guns just behind the troops and will shoot anyone that falls back. Soldiers found guilty of lesser crimes, such as upsetting an officer, are transferred to "penal units" for 3 months service which is often a death sentence as they are sent first into battle and on the most dangerous missions. They fight valiantly to clear their records and are released if wounded. Though ruthless on individuals, the terror does motivate Soviet resistance. However defiance alone does not win battles and by late August, the Germans have reached the Volga to the north and the city is nearly surrounded. Stalin's name is attached to the city and even women and children will be expected to take part in the defense. Those attempting to flee are sent back. The Soviet 62nd Army is not yet deployed in the city so initially, German advances on the edge of the city are resisted only by an NKVD division and largely unarmed workers of a tractor factory that now makes T-34 tanks. In the last week of August, the Luftwaffe systematically bombs city. As well as much of the city being reduced to rubble, fifty thousand are killed and three times as many are wounded. Much worse is to come as the German army enters the city and the Battle of Stalingrad begins on the ground. The Germans expect an easy victory but immediately encounter ferocious resistance with every ruined building being fought over. The Luftwaffe can no longer assist for risk of hitting their own troops. Every street is laid with mines to prevent tanks or artillery being brought in. Vasily Zaitsev describes a battle between snipers over a water source. One platoon of soldiers under Sergeant Pavlov are surrounded by Germans but hold a strategic building for two months before being relieved. A woman gives birth in the cellar during the ordeal. Soviet reinforcements crossing the Volga River to reach the city are vulnerable to attack and many are killed. A doctor, Boris Perepechaev, describes the shoreline covered in bodies and it is difficult to move about without stepping on them. Many are dead but some are wounded, the lucky among them are evacuated back across the river. Despite the tenacious resistance, German forces are still slowly advancing. General Chuikov, in command of the 62nd Army has been skilled in his deployment of his forces but they are outnumbered and by early November, German forces reach the river, cutting the Soviet army in two. Chuikov mounts desperate assaults on the Mamayev Mound, a strategic hill and it changes hands eight times. The Soviets need air support for their troops but the Luftwaffe largely controls the sky. In one incident, Kreeukan(?), the local Soviet Air Force command orders a squadron of fighter planes to battle but when they see the number of German bombers, they fly away. The captain is later shot and the other pilots sent to the penal units. Soviet air losses are horrific, made worse, as Afenal Genov(?) recounts, as half those graduating with him from pilot training are sent to join the infantry at Stalingrad. He had just 3 hours 40 minutes of flight time. As Stalingrad appears about to fall, Soviet citizens elsewhere support the war effort with money and jewelry in an effort to save their sons and brothers trapped in the battle. To ensure continued war production, whole factories are evacuated, out of harm's way, east of the Ural mountains. As every man is sent to the front, older children, as well as women, work in the factories, keep oil flowing and transport networks running. Stalin is completely focused on saving Stalingrad and uncharacteristically, urges caution on Marshal Zhukov as a counter-offensive is contemplated. Military aid from the allies arrives by Arctic convoy at the port of Murmansk and overland through Iran. American aircraft fly from Alaska into Siberia. Artillery chief Voronov leads planning of the counter-offensive with Vatutin, Rokossovsky and Yeryomenko along with political advisor Khrushchev. Overseeing everything are Stalin's most trusted commanders, Zhukov and Vasilevsky The counter-offensive, Operation Uranus, begins on 19 November with a massive artillery barrage. The tanks under Vatutin's command soon follow. Forces under Yeryomenko attack the next day. In three days on the south-west front, Kalach, 80km west of Stalingrad, is recaptured. On the 23rd the two Soviet armies meet, encircling the German 6th Army and 4th Panzer Army, a total of 300,000 men, inside Stalingrad. Hitler is shocked and orders Manstein and his shock troops to breach the Soviet line and secure the city but the Soviet 51st Army and the 2nd Guards block his approach despite the deployment of the new Tiger tank. The cost is high though with almost two thirds of the Guards sacrificed in the process. The German Army is now completely trapped and are ordered not to surrender. Göring promises that the Air Force will drop 500 tons of supplies but the transport planes are shot out of the sky. Not even 50 tons can be achieved. The bitter cold of winter sets in freezing corpses and causing frostbite. The Soviets offer an honorable surrender but Hitler rejects it demanding that his army fight to the end. Soviet bombardment continues and German troops are nearly out of ammunition. By late January (1943) whole regiments are surrendering, with the last German troops in Stalingrad giving up on 2 February. Sixth Army commander Paulus is not captured. Intelligence officer Lev Bezymensky overhears from prisoners that Paulus is still somewhere in the city and he is later captured in a basement and paraded for propaganda purposes. In all, the Soviets take 91,000 Germans prisoner.
7	"The Citadel"
In March 1943 with the victory at Stalingrad, Germany is now on the defensive and hope surged in the people of the Soviet Union. Children as young as 8 and 9 are enlisted in new military schools such as the academies named after 18th century general Alexander Suvorov though the war will be over before they graduate. Stalin orders offensives along the southern front through late winter, disregarding the lives of his exhausted troops but territory is regained. Author Bulat Okudzhava describes being sent to the front as part of a Soviet build-up for a coming offensive. Former paratrooper Konstantin Vanshenkin describes his experiences being drafted aged 17 and saying that with each new call up, the troops were younger. The transfer of industrial production to the east of the Urals is now paying off. Factories, now largely staffed by women, are producing ever greater quantities of armaments. The new weaponry was of high quality as demonstrated by the Shturmovik ground attack aircraft, Petlyakov bomber, T-34 tank and the KV tank. On the German side, the new Panther and Tiger tanks are being rushed into service. In the interests of increased production, more aircraft of existing types are produced rather than new designs and almost a million workers are transferred to the army. However, Germany is also waging a submarine campaign against the allies and sending troops to prop up allies. German plans then are to use overwhelming force for a quick victory in the east in the bulge around the city of Kursk. Reports from the region reaching Deputy Chief of Staff Antonov show a huge build-up of German forces. The Red Army plans a deep defense followed by counter-attacks. Stalin initially urges an immediate attack but Zhukov and Vasilevsky argue against it. Stalin now trusts his generals and accepts their advice so Soviet forces dig in to build a trap for the coming invaders. The northern German force is led by Field Marshal Kluge while Manstein is in charge of the forces to the south. Facing them are, respectively, forces led by Rokossovsky and Vatutin, with a reserve army led by Konev. Soviet forces get into position and wait. Weeks go by as the German offensive is delayed while waiting for the new tanks to arrive. A copy of the Kursk Madonna is brought to the troops. A German soldier is captured by a raiding party on 4 July and under interrogation, reveals that Operation Citadel is to begin that night. At midnight, a massive Soviet artillery barrage opens the Battle of Kursk, disrupting final German preparations for their attack. In the next week, thousands of tanks and tens of thousands of guns are brought to bear on each other as well as 3,000 Soviet aircraft and 2,000 of the Luftwaffe. On 12 July, the Soviet counter-attack begins forces coming in behind the two German armies from both the north and south and pounding them with Katyusha rockets. The ensuring battle is, above all, a battle between tanks and although the German tanks are more powerful, there are too few of them, so the Red Army tanks command the battlefield. The following day, the Germans abandon offensive operations and unable to hold their positions, start to retreat. Destroyed machinery and the bodies of hundreds of thousands of soldiers litter the battlefield. Soviet forces retake the cities of Orel and Belgorod on 5 August. Residents greet the liberators and in Moscow, there is an artillery salute to mark the victory. Although Stalin claims credit, it is a victory in which all Soviet citizens, including its women, had a part. There are the female fire fighters of Leningrad, female anti-aircraft gunners, Anya Kovaleva who disarmed 42 unexploded bombs, pilots such as Nadezhda Popova of the night bomber squadron formed by Marina Raskova flying outdated U-2 biplanes - they are known to the Germans as the Night Witches and Mariya Oktyabrskaya who raised money to buy a tank in which she is then killed. As the Red Army pushes west, it exposes more Nazi atrocities such as miners in Ukraine who were thrown down the shaft when they refused to cooperate. Broadcasts to Soviet citizens motivate them to revenge. The Red Army briefly stalls as it reaches the wide Dnieper river as troops crossing it are easy targets. The Battle of the Dnieper is fiercest north and south of Kiev where Germans hold the high ground on the west bank. The Red Army forces its way across but at a terrible price. During the war, 11,000 people are awarded the country's highest military honor, Hero of the Soviet Union; almost half of them as a result of this single battle. Stalin demands that Kiev be recaptured before 7 November anniversary of the Bolshevik revolution. It is but the liberation of Kiev kills more half a million residents of the city and troops on both sides, and leaves the city in ruins. Stalin then speaks of the victories and armies but not of victims. The Germans unearth the mass graves of Polish officers at Katyn Forest and invite foreign observes to bear witness to what they correctly claim are NKVD victims. Stalin denies involvement and when Churchill and Roosevelt meet him at the Tehran Conference they suppress their suspicions, ignoring the protests of exiled Poles. Rather than facing rebuke, Stalin is presented with a ceremonial sword from King George VI. Stalin gains a commitment from his allies to open a second front.
8	"False Dawn"
At the end of 1943, millions of Soviet citizens remain under Nazi rule. Stalin has Kalinin, the nominal head of state, read a New Year's message to the Soviet people, even though his wife was arrested some years earlier. In January 1944, the Red Army pushes west in the far north, finally lifting the siege of Leningrad, by which time nearly 2 million in the city have died of starvation, cold or German bombardment. The Red Army retake the Baltic states, Zhytomyr in Ukraine and surrounds 6 German divisions at Korsun. Those that are liberated face a new threat: since they have had contact with the enemy, Stalin suspects them all as possible collaborators and so they suffer collective punishment - even though they had no choice and the German occupation was largely a result of his failings. Vladimir Naumov explains that Stalin had used mass deportations of ethnic groups in the 1930s: in the west first with the forced transfer of Poles and in the east, the Koreans. Now in 1944, it is peoples from the Northern Caucasus - the Balkars, and the Chechens and Ingush. When the Germans are driven from the Crimea, 400,000 Tartars are deported. All these population transfers divert transportation resources from the military. Despite increasing domestic production, the Red Army still relies on the West for help - weapons of all kinds including tanks and the Liberty ships to bring them to Russia. However, British and American tanks are inferior to their Soviet counterparts; the highest priority is food and the trucks to distribute it. Valentina Ilkevich describes a German war crime in one village in Byelorussia and a second woman describes another, just two of many. Large fleets of British and American bombers, protected by long-distance fighters, conduct terror bombing attacks on German cities. However, Stalin considers these to be ineffective and demands that they open a second front in France. That second front, Operation Overlord, is opened on 6 June 1944, with the D-Day landings but German forces in France are only half those committed to the eastern front. Three years to they day after the German invasion, Zhukov launches a massive attack through Byelorussia, named after Bagration, a Georgian general from the Napoleonic era. One branch of the offensive which aims for Minsk starts north and south of Vitebsk and is led by Chernyakhovsky; a second is led by Rokossovsky and aims for Warsaw. A million Soviet partisans disrupt German supply lines and communications and secure bridges allowing regular troops to proceed unhindered. Minsk has already suffered though the German invasion and occupation, now suffers again as the Red Army fights its way in. 50,000 captured Germans are marched through Moscow before being sent to labor camps. In Berlin, already heavily damaged, Hitler loses his grip on reality refusing to recognize the dire military situation and still speaks of total victory. The officer class now deserts him and Claus von Stauffenberg leads an assassination attempt. Believing Hitler to be dead, the plotters move to seize control of Berlin but Hitler emerges virtually unharmed. As a result, the Gestapo arrest and torture hundreds. In the People's Court trials that followed, extreme Nazi judge Roland Freisler shouts at those before him for propaganda. Men such as Adam von Trott zu Solz and Count von Schulenburg are denounced and sentenced to death. Field Marshal Rommell, a national hero, is offered the choice: certain death following a trial, or a state funeral and protection for his family if he commits suicide. He chooses suicide. The Red Army pushes into Romania, Bulgaria, and Yugoslavia liberating Belgrade with the help of the partisans led by Tito. Professor Mikhail Semiryaga notes the importance of the Balkans over history and says that Churchill wanted to open the second front there. However, Poland is Stalin's priority. For the Poles themselves, the war has brought unrelenting suffering, especially for the Jewish population. Survivors in the Warsaw Ghetto mounted an uprising against extermination in 1943 but it was brutally crushed by the SS and the Ghetto is cleared. As the Red Army enters Poland, only a few dozen Jews are left hiding in Warsaw. Nazis built most of their extermination camps in Poland, where Jews, Gypsies and Soviet prisoners of war are gassed and their bodies burned. Poland no longer exists as a state but a resistance army remains along with an exile government in London. Majdanek in eastern Poland is the first death camp liberated by the Red Army when they arrive in late July 1944. Hitler's genocide is now exposed but there is worse to come at Sobibor, Treblinka and Auschwitz. Irina Kharina, a reconnaissance paratrooper, was captured in April 1943 and sent to Auschwitz. She recounts the fate of some French prisoners and is among those marched west as the Red Army approaches. She and a few others escapes by hiding in hay in a barn. Incredibly, when she makes contact with the Red Army, she is taken back to Auchwitz which is now being used as an interrogation center. As the Germans evacuate Poland, they massacre political prisoners. At Lublin Castle, the Soviets discover 600 bodies, mainly women, in the tailoring room, and many more in the courtyard. Despite his own crimes, Stalin is portrayed as the liberator of Poland but the Soviets establish the Lublin Committee, a puppet government, over the objections of the exile government in London. Stalin's true intent is made clear in Warsaw. The Red Army is just outside the city and on 29 July, Soviet radio urges the Polish Home Army to mount active resistance against the Germans and gives the impression, without actually saying so, that the Red Army is about to enter the city. On 1 August, the Warsaw Uprising begins and initially the rebels capture parts of the city but the Red Army does not move. Stalin even rejects Churchill's request for the R.A.F. to use Soviet airfields to drop supplies. SS units under General Bach-Zelewski arrive to put down the uprising with goes on through August and into September. Hopelessly outgunned, without resupply and without the Red Army joining the battle, the Home Army is crushed. The survivors surrender in October. The Red Army finally takes the city in January 1945 by which time 300,000 Poles have died since August. Any nationalist armed force in Poland is now completely destroyed - as Stalin intended. The British and Americans see the Soviet's deliberate inaction and now treat Stalin with suspicion. Churchill visits Moscow in October 1944 to discuss the shape of post-war Europe but he is a realist knows that he can do little. He concedes control over Hungary, Bulgaria and Romania in return for Stalin's pledge of non-intervention in Greece. The future of Yugoslavia is left undecided and Stalin refuses to discuss Poland. The future of Poland, the country over which Britain entered the war, dominates the next struggle with his current allies, at the conference in Yalta in February 1945. Roosevelt is now close to death. He wants Soviet help in the war against Japan and dismisses Churchill's fear of Soviet expansionism. While sidelining Churchill, Roosevelt gets Stalin's assurance that the Soviets will enter the war in the east after Germany is defeated and further efforts to deal with Poland's future are deflected.
9	"The Fall of the Swastika"
At the start of 1945, German cities are under heavy bombardment as the Luftwaffe is now outnumbered 6 to 1 and there is a desperate shortage of fuel. Yet defeat is arriving by land - the British, American and allied forces in the west, and the Soviets in the east. As the Red Army pushes through Poland, they free Soviet citizens in slave labor camps and the concentration camps. Red Army troops do not need to be motivated to seek revenge. Hitler orders the defense of Berlin to be fought to the last person. Old men, women and children are required to fight but at the same time, Hitler initiates a scorched earth policy, destroying infrastructure that will be required by survivors. Boys of the Hitler Youth prepare for battle. The Western allies cross the natural barrier of the Rhine by late March and press their way east. Resistance is collapsing and many Germans flee west to surrender to the Americans and British rather than the vengeful Red Army. Hitler is now completely delusional, still speaking of victory as the Battle of Berlin is about to begin. Zhukov will command the assault on the city. Nikolai Puchkov says that Zhukov was the only person that could argue against Stalin when he demands something unwise. Stalin knows that he needs Zhukov but Zhukov's independence enrages him and so Zhukov is monitored by NKVD agents. Vladimir Dymov says that Abakumov, Beria, Kobolov Mikhail Kovalyov and Mekalov started to collect evidence against Zhukov after Khalkhin Gol and surveillance increased as he was promoted. The Red Army begins the offensive to take Berlin at night on 15 April. Forces led by Konev attack from the south, meeting little resistance and so sweep around to the west of the city. Forces under Rokossovsky push towards the city from the north, while forces under Zhukov advance from the east. Meanwhile, the aerial bombardment of the city continues. By the 19th, Soviet forces are in the suburbs. In his bunker, Hitler is detached from the catastrophe unfolding outside, dwelling on past glories and celebrating the death of Roosevelt. He believes that the Allies will soon be at war with each other. On the 25th, Soviet and American forces meet at the Elbe, to the west of Berlin, and a celebratory lunch is held. Pilot Hanna Reitsch, the only woman to be awarded the Iron Cross in the war, flies a light plane into central Berlin on 29 April [actually the 26th], lands and makes her way to Hitler's bunker. She offers to take Hitler out of Berlin but he elects to stay. The following day, Hitler marries Eva Braun. Outside the bunker, many of the German defenders surrender but there are some that continue to mount ferocious resistance, including SS units at the Reichstag. However, they are overcome and the Red Army raises the Soviet flag over the Reichstag. Germany is defeated. Attention now turns to finding the Nazi leaders. The bodies of Goebbels and his wife are discovered. Before killing themselves, they had arranged for their doctor to poison their six children. Himmler commits suicide while in British custody. For committed Nazis, the end of the Reich meant the end of everything and an "epidemic of suicides sweeps Germany". Göring turns himself in. Keitel, Dönitz, Speer and Hess are captured within days but Hitler's whereabouts is, for the moment, unknown. The Soviets find Hitler's body along with that of Braun. Hitler had given orders that their bodies be burned in the garden outside the bunker. Zhokov informs Stalin of the discovery but Stalin refuses to believe it. Berier is sent to investigate. Three hundred thousand Soviet troops were killed in the battle. The situation for the residents of Berlin is desperate; most are starving and thousand of women are raped. Germany's unconditional surrender is made, by Keitel, to Zhukov, just after midnight on 9 May. Red Army soldiers and citizens across the Soviet Union celebrate. With the war won, the Stalin now turns on Zhukov. Abakumov is sent to Germany to arrest anyone that could discredit Zhukov but Zhukov finds out and threatens to have him arrested. Vladimir Dymov says that Air Marshal Novikov and Zhukov's personal aide Seomutchkin(?) were arrested, beaten and forced to denounce Zhukov. Novikov claims that Zhukov had organized a plot against Stalin while Seomutchkin says that he had been sent to establish a secret communication channel with Eisenhower. Zhokov was demoted to a lesser post in Odesa and demoted further when sent to the Urals. Other high-ranking officers fared worse. Novikov and 40 Soviet generals are arrested and will remain in prison until after Stalin's death. General Telegin reports looting by NKVD units and is punished with a 25-year prison term. Mikhail Semyryaga says that soldiers under the head of the NKVD in Berlin, General Sidnyev(?) found a portion of the remaining Nazi gold reserves and four bags of Reichsmarks. Sidnyev told his superior, Sirov(?), of the discovery but instead of reporting it, they shared the "booty" with their men, something that was not known until 50 years later. As Berlin is divided between the occupying powers, the Soviets see the need to appear generous to the desperate civilian population and some food is distributed even though there are shortages at home. Large numbers of children have been separated from their families so newsreels are created showing lost children in the hope of locating the parents. As well as German children, there are Soviet children that were abducted from Nazi-occupied Soviet territories and they are sent home but will be treated with suspicion. Also under suspicion are returning Soviet prisoners of war. They are sent to one of a 100 internment camps to be interrogated by the NKVD and many are imprisoned. The Allies also return Soviet citizens that escaped west, including General Krasnov, Ataman of the Don Cossacks, who fought against the Bolsheviks after the Revolution and then, with 70,000 men under his command, fought with Germany. At the end of the war, they surrender to the British on the understanding that they will not be sent back but the British break their promise. One incident in the repatriation of Cossacks is described where some returnees are shot immediately upon crossing the bridge into Soviet-controlled territory. Collaborator General Vlasov and his soldiers are captured. At the Potsdam Conference, Stalin meets Allied leaders Churchill and Truman to discuss the de-militarization of Germany, to confirm the zones of occupation, the transfer of 6 million ethnic Germans into Germany from Czechoslovakia, Hungary and Poland, recognition of the Lublin government in Poland, and Soviet 'de facto' control over eastern Europe. Stalin will not be drawn on the fate of Hitler. Post-war tensions and the Iron Curtain that will divide Europe, are foreshadowed. Initially, ordinary soldiers from the conquering armies enjoy each other's company but over the coming years, Soviet tanks will enforce the separation. The peoples of Eastern Europe do not yet know the tyranny that lies ahead under Soviet domination; prison camps such as one on the Kolyma River are hidden thousands of miles away. Twenty million people pass through the Gulag of which four million are shot and at least that many die of sickness and starvation. However, these atrocities are hidden from the world. By contrast, German atrocities are fully exposed. Ten million suffered in German death camps of which eight million died and of those, three million were Soviet citizens. Those responsible face the Nuremberg trials of 1946 and seven leading Nazis are executed, not including Göring who commits suicide. Details of Hitler's death, buried in Soviet archives, only come to light 50 years afterwards. As well as documents, there are "relics" such as Hitler's uniform and his personal library that includes a signed copy of "Pesthauch Der Welt" (Plague of the World) by anti-Semite Robert Ley. The bodies of Hitler and Braun are in secret tombs in Magdeburg until 1970 when Andropov and Brezhnev order the KGB to exhume the remains which are then crushed and scattered over German marshland. Only his teeth and part of his skull were kept - there is almost nothing left of Hitler but "in Stalin, the world has much to fear".
10	"The Cult of Personality"
With the war in Europe over, Stalin presides over a gigantic military parade in Moscow on 24 June. Stalin in personally victorious have swept aside all opposition and enforced his will on the Soviet people. Professor Vitaly Leltechuk says that Stalin is the greatest Tsar in Russian history and Stalin considered himself one. The only person that comes close in the people's affection is Zhukov who leads the parade. He is too popular to eliminate so he is sidelined. Although the term has not yet been coined, the Soviet Union is now a superpower. At the end of parade, Heroes of the Soviet Union hurl banners of the defeated Nazis at Stalin's feet. Vitaly Leltechuk claims that in the war's immediate aftermath, there were discussions amongst the leadership about "keep the tanks rolling to the English Channel". Marshal Budyonny was enthusiastic about this idea but Stalin interrupted him asking, "Who would feed them?", referring to the western Europeans. However, in Magadan on Russia's Pacific coast, there was an airborne army ready to attack Alaska. In keeping with promises made to the Allies, Stalin declares war on Japan. He has a plan to land troops on Hokkaido with subsequent annexation or political control of the island. However, the dropping of the atomic bomb by the Enola Gay on Hiroshima and then, a few days later, the bombing of Nagasaki, shocks the world and demonstrates that there is a new military world order. Soviet troops move into Manchuria and into Korea, where Japanese forces north of the 38th Parallel surrender to Soviet forces. Stalin realizes that further imperial conquests must wait until the Soviet Union builds its own atomic bomb and so the Hokkaido landings are canceled. Attention then turns to repairing the damage of war. Byelorussia, Ukraine and western Russia lie in ruins - twenty five million are without real homes. There are expectations of a brighter future and Soviet citizens start reconstruction. However, there is compulsion and punishment. Professor Mikhail Semiryaga says that millions of Ukrainian girls returning from German forced labor camps are sent to directly to mines in the Donbas in retaliation for working for the enemy. They were allowed home only after men were demobilized from the army two years later. Reports are sent to Stalin by Malenkov and Beria about what is happening all over the country, including items such as traffic tickets by the children of ministers. The return of the one million German prisoners of war is set at 1 January 1949, although in practice, the last will not be allowed to leave for another five years as their forced labor is valuable. They are treated better than Soviet citizens in the Gulag with the hope that they will take communist ideas back to Germany. However, there are public executions of Germans judged guilty of war crimes and Soviet collaborators. The Baltic states are forcibly annexed into the Soviet Union. Now rid of the Germans, partisans fight the new enemy but they are overwhelmed by NKVD troops. One report notes the deportation of 300 Lithuanian families, accused of resisting Soviet rule, to ? in Siberia. Resistance continues too in western Ukraine and in response, Soviet authorities kill over 2,000 and arrest another 3,000 in a single month. Folk dances and patriotic songs are the only remnants of the old Ukraine that are still permitted. Drought in 1946 in Ukraine and southern Russia brings crop failure and then famine. Farmers cannot eat what they produced until a quota is met. Nikolai Minushkin says that theft from the collective farm was the only way to survive but anyone caught went straight to prison, citing one woman that picked a few ears of wheat and was sent away for 5 or 6 years. At the end of the harvest, everything is taken away leaving them with nothing. Local bureaucrats are tasked with ensuring that quotas were met and they live well but if they fail to deliver then they too disappear. Propaganda films show a land of prosperity while most of the population lives in desperate poverty. Historian Galina Ivanova explains the lengths that the NKVD went to to extract confessions: Fake border posts were set up near the Chinese border with fake Manchurian guards on the "other side". Prisoners were offered freedom if they were willing to spy so they were sent over the "border" and were then captured. Under torture they would confess all they knew to people they thought were Chinese. Then they would agree to be double-agents and were sent back. With confessions in hand, the prisoner could now be sent to the GULAG or simply shot. Close associates of Stalin have no protection. Molotov's wife is under arrest; Marshal Voroshilov is accused of spying for the British; the brother of Kaganovich is arrested and shot. The sister of Stalin's wife, Anna Alliluyeva writes a memoir and is given a 10-year prison sentence and her husband Reddens is shot; the wife of Stalin's son is arrested; Kapler, the first boyfriend of Stalin's daughter is sent to forced labor. Leaders in the country's scientific and arts communities sign a declaration of praise for Stalin yet they too are at risk. Andrei Zhdanov and Beria conduct a witch-hunt to remove any western influence from Soviet media and the arts. One victim is poet Anna Akhmatova who is denounced as "part nun, part harlot"; another, Mikhail Zoshchenko. Some are taken to the notorious Butýrskaya prison in Moscow. Popular singer Ruslanova is sentence to 10 years; actress Fyodorova, a former favorite of Stalin, is given a 25 year sentence for having an affair with an American. Stalin believes that director Eisenstein's unflattering film about Ivan the Terrible is really about him and moves to punish him but Eisenstein dies of a heart attack before he can be punished. Churchill makes a speech in Fulton, Missouri in America in which the term Iron Curtain is first used, recognizing the start of the Cold War. Cartoonist Boris Yefimov, describes receiving a telephone call from Stalin saying that he should show Eisenhower "armed to his teeth". Yefmiov completed the drawing of the arctic and Stalin added a caption - "a rather quaint way of declaring the cold war". Stalin knows that there cannot be parity with the US until the Soviet Union also has the atomic bomb. On 25 September 1949, Soviet news agency TASS announce a successful test by the Soviet atomic bomb project, an effort in which scientists were aided by spies in the US and Britain. In December 1949, Stalin's birthday (actually his 71st, not 70th as stated) was celebrated on a grand scale. In attendance was Mao Zedong who led his communist forces to victory in the Chinese Civil War. Mao and Kim Il Sung, leader of North Korea, seek Soviet support for an attack on South Korea. With expansion to the west blocked by NATO, Stalin agrees and the Korean War starts six months later. To Stalin's surprise, America joins the war, leading forces sanctioned by the United Nations. Professor Volkogonov claims that although Stalin recognized it would be devastating to Koreans, he was happy to let the war drag on to exhaust the democracies, at least until the use of nuclear weapons was proposed as the Americans by then had much more powerful weapons than the Soviets possessed. At the 19th Party Congress, Stalin ridicules western countries but his criticisms more accurately apply to the Soviet state. Now nearing the end of his life, Stalin's suspicions turn to the Jews among the Kremlin's doctors. In the Doctors' plot, Vinogradov is arrested. He and others are accused of plotting to poison senior figures in the government. Professor Volkogonov says that many feared that this was the start of a new round of purges, even worse than those in the 1930s. Alexey Rybin, one of Stalin's bodyguards, describes the day that Stalin failed to rise during the day and how, in the early evening, one of the guards entered Stalin's private rooms and discovered him lying on the floor incapacitated. Chief guard Shtarostein(?) telephoned Malenkov who, with Beria, arrived at the dacha at 3am. Beria scolded Ligachov(?), one of the guards, saying Stalin was just sleeping and not to disturb him further. However, doctors were called and Beria told the lead doctor that failing to save him would result in the doctor being shot. Stalin died that night and a state funeral follows. The Soviet people survived the loss of more than twenty million citizens in the Great Patriotic War but also millions more as a direct result of actions by their own leader. Stalin's death therefore "embodied the hope of a better world for millions".

== Criticism ==
Dr. Nick Baron an associate professor at the Faculty of Arts, University of Nottingham writes:

The series presents what was, even in 1995, in the scholarly historiography, an outmoded view of Stalin's Soviet Union. It reinforces rather than seeks to challenge popular preconceptions about the dictator's rule.

He suggests it is simplistic to say Stalin was an evil genius and that the population not sent to the gulag or the front was held in thrall by propaganda.

For a full understanding of this history, it is as relevant and vital to study the sources of popular enthusiasm for Stalin and social participation in the system as it is to examine the origins and course of terror and repression.

He notes some errors where the visual footage does not match what is being described, imprecise chronology, quotes used out of context and some mistranslations.

However, he concludes

The documentary is compelling viewing, with some breathtaking footage and a powerful original musical score, and will be of greatest interest to those with a general interest in the Second World War. For students and scholars of Soviet political and social history, however, its commentary will be found lacking analytical sophistication and its principal value lies in its extensive use of hitherto mainly unseen archival film and interviews with participants in events.

== Books ==
After the television series was released, the book Russia's War: Blood Upon The Snow, was published in hardback but renamed as Russia's War: A History of the Soviet Effort: 1941-1945 in paperback.
