= Medium season 5 =

Medium
- Season 5
- DVD cover
- No. of episodes: 19

Release
- Original network: NBC
- Original release: February 2 – June 1, 2009

Season chronology
- ← Previous; Season 4 Next → Season 6 (on CBS)

The fifth season of Medium, an American television series, consisted of 19 episodes, premiering on February 2, 2009, and ending on June 1, 2009. This was the final season of the show to air on NBC. Although the show was initially renewed for a sixth season, NBC reversed course and cancelled it. CBS, whose studio produced the show, picked it up within 24 hours after NBC's cancellation.

== Production ==
With the ratings improvement Medium demonstrated in its fourth season after returning to Mondays, it was one of the first series to be renewed in an early announcement in April 2008 from NBC regarding its 2008–09 season. Similar to the previous season, Medium was initially scheduled to move to the Sunday night line-up; however, a December 2008 press release revealed that the fifth season would air in the series' original Monday night 10 p.m. time slot.

After some ratings erosion during its fifth season, NBC renewed Medium for an abridged sixth season in early May 2009. However, within a week negotiations stalled over episode count and subsequently NBC decided not to renew the series despite the fact that it outperformed some of the network's renewed shows. Within 24 hours of NBC's cancellation, CBS, whose production arm produces the series, renewed the show for a full 22-episode season.

== Plot ==
Season 5 gets off to a better start for the DuBois family. Allison gets her job back working for the DA, while Joe gets hired by a greedy entrepreneur who wants and expects Allison to dream up winning stock prices. Allison finds herself being stalked by a deranged fanatic and gets the job opportunity of a lifetime, but it's for the boss whose son is a serial killer so they can keep her quiet since she works for the DA. Meanwhile, Cynthia Keener makes one more appearance in this season trying to help a girl that was raped and kidnapped years earlier only to do exactly the same thing to the guy who kidnapped her turns the tables on him and gets his wife, but Ms. Keener while still in prison for killing her daughter's killer helps Allison save the young woman. Enzo Rossi, the real life son of Patricia Arquette, plays a character in the episode A Person of Interest. Unfortunately, the season ends on a bad turn, Allison discovers she has a brain tumor located in her brain stem, but puts off her surgery to catch two bad guys, one working for Devalos and the other in a drug cartel.

== Cast and characters ==
=== Main cast ===
- Patricia Arquette as Allison DuBois
- Miguel Sandoval as Manuel Devalos
- David Cubitt as Lee Scanlon
- Sofia Vassilieva as Ariel DuBois
- Maria Lark as Bridgette DuBois
- Jake Weber as Joe DuBois

=== Recurring cast ===
- Madison and Miranda Carabello as Marie DuBois
- Bruce Gray as Joe's Dad
- Tina DiJoseph as Lynn DiNovi
- Amanda Detmer Joe's Sister
- Anjelica Huston as Cynthia Keener

== Episodes ==
No. overall	No. in season	Title	Directed by	Written by	Original release date	U.S. viewers (millions)
77	1	"Soul Survivor"	Aaron Lipstadt	Craig Sweeny & Robert Doherty	February 2, 2009	8.56
Allison tries to help Devalos find the murderer of his friend's sister, however, her visions point toward the friend's husband who was killed in a car crash two years ago.
78	2	"Things to Do in Phoenix When You're Dead"	Aaron Lipstadt	Diane Ademu-John	February 9, 2009	7.89
Allison dreams of murder and blackmail, in which the only witness is a ghost. Pursuing the ghost to seek his help, she finds that he is alive. Meanwhile, Ariel has a weird reaction to her health assignment while working with her classmate and project partner, Adam (Lucas Till).
79	3	"A Person of Interest"	Patricia Arquette	Robert Doherty & Craig Sweeny	February 16, 2009	8.97
While working on a crime, Allison becomes obsessed with mechanical engineering. Meanwhile, Joe has his colleague over for dinner.
80	4	"…About Last Night"	Aaron Lipstadt	Ken Schefler	February 23, 2009	8.43
Allison wakes up under a highway overpass clutching a mysterious note in one hand and has no recollection of the last six hours of her life. She later finds a woman's hand in her purse and begins to think she may have killed someone during those six hours. Ariel applies for her learner's permit.
81	5	"A Taste of Her Own Medicine"	Ronald L. Schwary	Moira Kirland	March 2, 2009	7.26
Allison attempts to help find the daughter of Devalos' friends, who seemed to have simply left town. Meanwhile Joe finds out that he is suffering from sleep deprivation, and Scanlon and Lynn's relationship takes an unexpected turn.
82	6	"Apocalypse, Now?"	Larry Teng	Michael Narducci	March 9, 2009	7.13
Allison begins preparing for the end of the world, as exposed to her through her dreams. She soon realizes that the man she believed to be the only one to survive the apocalypse is involved in a family massacre.
83	7	"A Necessary Evil"	Vincent Misiano	Matt Witten	March 23, 2009	6.64
Allison teams up with the ghost of FBI Agent Cooper in order to catch a criminal, but she suspects Agent Cooper is once again up to no good. When Agent Cooper decides Allison is more trouble than she's worth he turns against her.
84	8	"Truth Be Told"	Ernest Dickerson	Travis Donnelly & Corey Reed	March 30, 2009	7.27
Allison gains the ability to know when people are lying and with this ability discovers that a couple murdered their friends; the only problem is there is no evidence to support her claim.
85	9	"All in the Family"	Peter Werner	Diane Ademu-John & Gary Tieche	April 6, 2009	7.17
Allison works on what seems to be an ordinary missing person's case; however, Allison suspects the victim's children may have something to do with her disappearance. Meanwhile Joe's sister shows up looking for a place to stay after discovering that her husband is cheating on her. Guest stars: James Van Der Beek and Morena Baccarin.
86	10	"Then... and Again"	Larry Teng	Travis Donnelly & Corey Reed	April 13, 2009	7.65
Allison wakes up five years in the past, at which point she has never met Devalos and is nine months pregnant. In the year 2004 she attempts to convince her future boss that he is currently convicting an innocent man.
87	11	"The Devil Inside (Part I)"	Peter Werner	Diane Ademu-John	April 20, 2009	7.34
Allison is being stalked by a man who believes that it is his duty to end her life in the name of God. This soon puts her entire family at risk and they are forced into a home lockdown.
88	12	"The Devil Inside (Part II)"	Peter Werner	Michael Narducci	April 27, 2009	6.71
Allison is no longer able to trust her dreams because the ghost of a madman has jumped into her mind and is turning all of her dreams into nightmares.
89	13	"How to Make a Killing in Big Business (Part I)"	Arlene Sanford & Robert Doherty	Michael Narducci & Craig Sweeny	May 4, 2009	7.24
Allison is recruited by a Fortune 500 company to predict business trends. However, she continues to dream about a case involving a serial killer that she was working on in the DA's office.
90	14	"How to Make a Killing in Big Business (Part II)"	Arlene Sanford & Robert Doherty	Michael Narducci & Craig Sweeny	May 4, 2009	7.24
Allison is recruited by a Fortune 500 company to predict business trends. However, she continues to dream about a case involving a serial killer that she was working on in the DA's office. The company founder Douglas Lydecker (David Morse) asks Allison to identify any suspicious employees, but the only person she has a bad feeling about is Douglas' son, Justin. After Allison alerts Scanlon about the police detective involved in the murders, Douglas threatens Allison with suing her to poverty if she reveals her dreams to the police again. Meanwhile, Ariel takes her friend's anti-anxiety pills because a ghost won't leave her alone while she studies for the PSATs.
91	15	"How to Make a Killing in Big Business (Part III)"	Miguel Sandoval	Davah Avena	May 11, 2009	6.40
Allison holds a dark secret and Ariel has dreams that indicate her teacher may be in grave danger.
92	16	"The Man in the Mirror"	Aaron Lipstadt	Travis Donnelly & Corey Reed	May 11, 2009	7.30
When Allison suddenly goes into a coma, her spirit ends up in the body of a middle-aged man (Jeffrey Tambor), who insists on living with Joe and the children.
93	17	"The First Bite Is the Deepest"	Patricia Arquette	Diane Ademu-John	May 18, 2009	6.56
Cynthia Keener returns, asking Allison to help find a missing friend of hers. Allison is also asked by a real estate mogul to help find his missing wife. In the meantime, Joe struggles with what to do when offered a position that would require a move to San Diego.
94	18	"The Talented Ms. Boddicker"	Aaron Lipstadt	Michael Narducci	May 25, 2009	7.86
Allison dreams about and then meets a quirky bank teller, Mrs. Boddicker who apparently predicted her bank's recent robbery. Meanwhile, Joe's new job in San Diego puts a strain on the family and Allison must learn to cope in his absence.
95	19	"Bring Me the Head of Oswaldo Castillo"	Arlene Sanford	Robert Doherty & Craig Sweeny	June 1, 2009	7.41
Allison dreams of a future where an unfamiliar man is comforting her after the loss of her entire family. She later meets the same unfamiliar man in her waking life while investigating a case and thus fears her awful dream will soon come true. After headaches and other symptoms, Allison is diagnosed with a brain tumor. She postpones her surgery to continue dreaming, getting information leading to the arrest her family's "killer" before they are killed. The surgery delay results in a stroke, which despite the successful surgery, leaves her comatose. The season ends with doubts about her survival.
