= Labor Pains =

Labor (or labour) pains may refer to:

- Pain experienced during the process of childbirth
- Labor Pains (film), a 2009 American romantic comedy film
- "Labor Pains" (The Simpsons), an episode of the American animated television series The Simpsons
- "Labor Pains" (Medium), an episode of the American television series Medium
