= Medium season 6 =

Medium
- Season 6
- DVD cover
- No. of episodes: 22

Release
- Original network: CBS
- Original release: September 25, 2009 – May 21, 2010

Season chronology
- ← Previous; Season 5 (on NBC) Next → Season 7

The sixth season of Medium, an American television series, began September 25, 2009, and ended on May 21, 2010. It is the first season to air on CBS after NBC canceled the show after 5 seasons. CBS screened Medium on Friday nights between Ghost Whisperer and Numb3rs.

== Production ==
After some ratings erosion during its fifth season, NBC renewed Medium for an abridged sixth season in early May 2009. However, within a week negotiations stalled over episode count and subsequently NBC decided not to renew the series despite the fact that it outperformed some of the network's renewed shows. Within 24 hours of NBC's cancellation, CBS, whose production arm produces the series, renewed the show for a full, 22-episode, sixth season, placing it in the Friday at 9:00 p.m. slot between fellow CBS in-house productions Ghost Whisperer (which had a similar theme to Medium) and Numb3rs.

The sixth season premiered on Friday, September 25, 2009 at 9pm. Throughout its sixth season, Medium and its lead-in Ghost Whisperer won their respective time slots on most Fridays, and each show took turns being the most-watched show of the night. As the season drew to a close, Ghost Whisperer was considered a definite renewal, whereas Medium was once again on the bubble for renewal. However, the network announced on May 18, 2010, that Medium was renewed for a seventh season, while seven other series, including Ghost Whisperer, were canceled by the network. TVbytheNumbers.com speculated that the decision was made because Medium is fully owned by CBS, while Ghost Whisperer was split between CBS and ABC. Upon its return in September 2010, Medium took over the Friday 8 p.m. slot vacated by Ghost Whisperer.

== Plot ==
Allison is finally out of her coma after suffering from a brain tumor on her brain stem and at first she can barely use her right hand, but as the season progresses she gets better and better. For the first few episodes Mrs. DuBois walks with a cane and does physical therapy. She got to keep her gift because she delayed the surgery from season 5 at the very end to catch Oswaldo Castillo. Allison's friend who was in the hospital with her (played by Martha Plimpton) dies under mysterious circumstances and Allison realizes it was the doctor who saved her life. The Halloween episode Bite Me is a take on Night of the Living Dead where Allison uses her dream to catch a killer no one would never suspect. Another greedy doctor creates a vaccine hoping to make millions by infecting people, but the courageous guy that the doctor gave it to, killed himself. Joe had to resign from his San Diego job when Allison was in her coma. He gets a new job, but to his dismay he gets to work with a very eccentric leader played by Joel Moore. By now, all three girls are growing up with Ariel graduating high school. Allison learns a valuable lesson in one episode where she tries desperately to get Ariel to do the things she does, but soon realizes Ariel has to live her life and move on to college. She wants to attend Dartmouth College in New Hampshire. Lee and Lynn have a baby and decide to get married in the final episode.

== Cast and characters ==
=== Main cast ===
- Patricia Arquette as Allison DuBois
- Miguel Sandoval as Manuel Devalos
- David Cubitt as Lee Scanlon
- Sofia Vassilieva as Ariel DuBois
- Maria Lark as Bridgette DuBois
- Jake Weber as Joe DuBois

=== Recurring cast ===
- Madison and Miranda Carabello as Marie DuBois
- Bruce Gray as Joe's dad
- Tina DiJoseph as Lynn DiNovi
- Roxanne Hart as Lily Devalos
- Dean Norris as Scanlon's brother
- Joel Moore as Joe's boss

== Episodes ==
No. overall	No. in season	Title	Directed by	Written by	Original release date	U.S. viewers (millions)
96	1	"Déjà Vu All Over Again"	Aaron Lipstadt	Craig Sweeny & Robert Doherty	September 25, 2009	8.87
Allison is slowly, sporadically regaining both her physical abilities and her psychic talents. Unfortunately, she becomes more confused than enlightened when her "gift" re-emerges as a strange form of deja-vu, that hinders rather than helps her in her investigation of a newscaster's alleged stalker.
97	2	"Who's That Girl?"	Larry Teng	Corey Reed & Travis Donnelly	October 2, 2009	7.84
Ariel begins to display bizarre behavior, unnerving Allison, who theorizes that a slain revenge-seeking stripper might be possessing Ariel.
98	3	"Pain Killer"	Tate Donovan	Craig Sweeny & Robert Doherty	October 9, 2009	8.29
A cancer-stricken friend of Allison’s dies suddenly, leading her to suspect the woman’s illness did not kill her, and that a hospital's doctor is to blame. Elsewhere, Joe takes cues from a story Bridgette wrote when it eerily echoes his latest job interview.
99	4	"The Medium Is the Message"	Larry Teng	Michael Narducci & Robert Doherty	October 16, 2009	8.10
Allison sees visions of mysterious symbols that could be the key to capturing a serial killer, but they may simply be consequences of her recent brain surgery, which leads her to unravel the truth behind them.
100	5	"Baby Fever"	Vincent Misiano	Jordan Rosenberg	October 23, 2009	8.48
Allison becomes obsessed with rescuing the 11-month-old son of Dana and Scott Calvert, and ultimately becomes so fixated on the child that she kidnaps him. Meanwhile, Bridgette starts to study the clarinet, until Marie turns out to be a prodigy.
101	6	"Bite Me"	Aaron Lipstadt	Robert Doherty & Craig Sweeny	October 30, 2009	7.82
In a Halloween special, Allison has vivid nightmares that insert her into scenes from the classic horror film Night of the Living Dead, which leave her with unexplained cuts and bite marks and possible clues that could lead her to a funeral director's murderer.
102	7	"New Terrain"	Arlene Sanford	Steve Lichtman	November 6, 2009	7.74
When Allison's car is wrecked, the SUV she rents turns out to have some unusual features, including a satellite radio that allows her to hear other people's conversations.
103	8	"Once in a Lifetime"	David Arquette	Heather Mitchell	November 13, 2009	8.16
When Ariel begins dating a boy from school, Allison has visions that indicate he may be involved in a local murder. Meanwhile, Bridgette finds herself in trouble when she is discovered posting embarrassing videos of a man on the Internet.
104	9	"The Future's So Bright"	Peter Werner	Craig Sweeny & Robert Doherty	November 20, 2009	7.80
When Allison develops a strange sensitivity to light, the sunglasses she wears reveal mysterious numbers across people's foreheads. Also, Allison's dream about Joe's dad causes Joe to start taking better care of his health.
105	10	"You Give Me Fever"	Aaron Lipstadt	Jordan Rosenberg	December 4, 2009	6.96
Allison's visions become a vital source of information to the authorities after samples of a deadly disease disappear. Meanwhile, Scanlon thinks he's ready to ask Lynn to marry him, but his plans don't go as smoothly as expected.
106	11	"An Everlasting Love"	Peter Werner	Corey Reed & Travis Donnelly	January 8, 2010	8.87
The police hunt a serial murderer, dubbed the "penny jar killer" because dead bodies are left at the scene of fresh kidnappings. When the primary suspect dies, his ghost contacts Allison to clear his name and communicate with his girlfriend. Allison reluctantly complies hoping the ghost will help her with the case. Meanwhile, Joe's boss asks him to critique his debut novel's 900+ page manuscript.
107	12	"Dear Dad"	Aaron Lipstadt	Geoff Geib	January 15, 2010	8.96
As the anniversary of Devalos' daughter's death come to pass, Devalos is haunted by memories of the traumatic event. This is exacerbated by the presence of a mysterious letter that appears in Devalos' mailbox. Meanwhile, Allison has dreams of Devalos' earlier days as a defense attorney and the morally ambiguous measures he once took against a client.
108	13	"Psych"	Vincent Misiano	Diane Ademu-John & Robert Doherty	January 29, 2010	8.02
Allison dreams about a schizophrenic child. She later meets the child, now grown up and acting normal, in a psychiatric ward, where her roommate has allegedly run away. Meanwhile, Bridgette develops feelings for a boy.
109	14	"Will the Real Fred Rovick Please Stand Up?"	Larry Reibman	Craig Sweeny & Robert Doherty	February 5, 2010	9.10
With everyone caught up in the sensational trial of a glamorous young woman accused of the murder of her 93-year-old husband, Allison begins seeing the face of a man named Fred (Diedrich Bader) everywhere she goes.
110	15	"How to Beat a Bad Guy"	Larry Teng	Michael Narducci	March 5, 2010	7.91
Allison enrols herself in self-defense classes that may be connected to a series of other murders. Meanwhile, Devalos works on a teenager's rape case, as well as looking into a suspected murder involving a police officer that is believed to be Scanlon's convicted, older brother.
111	16	"Allison Rolen Got Married"	David Paymer	Heather Mitchell	March 12, 2010	7.62
Allison and Joe's wedding is revisited, and as they prepare for their big day, she must also cope with the increasing strength of her "gift" and what these glimpses into her possible future could mean for her and her life with Joe.
112	17	"There Will Be Blood... Type A."	Arlene Sanford	Jordan Rosenberg	April 2, 2010	6.20
Allison and her daughters dream of the same mysterious girl who may be linked to the bizarre serial murders of entire families. Also, Joe and his boss find themselves at odds while working on a major project.
113	18	"There Will Be Blood... Type B."	Peter Werner	Steve Lichtman	April 9, 2010	7.54
Allison bonds with the mysterious girl from her dreams who she now must protect when the serial killer eyes the girl as the next target. Also, Joe expresses reluctance when he gets some added job responsibilities.
114	19	"Sal"	Craig Sweeny	Craig Sweeny & Doug Magnuson	April 30, 2010	6.28
After a neighbor is murdered, Allison's fears for her own family prompt her to install a high-tech talking burglar alarm, which she later suspects may be communicating with Marie. Also, Ariel meets a ghost who could help her get into the college of her choice.
115	20	"Time Keeps on Slipping"	Miguel Sandoval	Heather Mitchell & Robert Doherty	May 7, 2010	7.12
After staying awake for many hours studying for an important test that will change her future, a distressed Ariel begins to lose hours and then years of time in her life. She then must solve a crime that happened in her past and looks to her future self to find out how to get back to the present.
116	21	"Dead Meat"	Arlene Sanford	Michael Narducci & Robert Doherty	May 14, 2010	6.22
When an animal rights activist working undercover at a farm goes missing, Allison befriends a pig that could hold the key to the woman's whereabouts. Also, Joe's special birthday gift from Marie leaves him wondering how she was able to obtain it.
117	22	"It's a Wonderful Death"	Aaron Lipstadt	Craig Sweeny & Shaun Kasser & Samir Mehta	May 21, 2010	6.82
In the season finale, Allison's brain tumor resurfaces, with an aftermath that could result in life changing consequences for her friends and family. But when Ariel receives an acceptance letter from her University of choice, Allison must begin to realize that she must let her daughter become a strong and confident woman.
