= Death and the Compass (film) =

1996 film

- Theatrical release poster
- Directed by: Alex Cox
- Written by: Alex Cox
- Based on: Death and the Compass by Jorge Luis Borges
- Produced by: Karl Braun; Lorenzo O'Brien
- Starring: Peter Boyle; Miguel Sandoval; Christopher Eccleston
- Cinematography: Miguel Garzón
- Edited by: Carlos Puente
- Music by: Pray for Rain
- Release date: August 5, 1996
- Running time: 96 minutes
- Country: United States
- Language: English
- Budget: $3.5 million

Death and the Compass is a 1996 American thriller film written and directed by Alex Cox, based on Jorge Luis Borges' 1942 short story of the same name. It stars Peter Boyle, Miguel Sandoval, and Christopher Eccleston. Mexican actress Zaide Silvia Gutiérrez also appears.

The film was originally a 55-minute drama made for Spanish TV/BBC in 1992. Producer Karl Braun found further money to expand the film into a feature, but the film was not completed for four years. It was filmed on location in Mexico City.

The soundtrack was composed by Dan Wool and Pray for Rain.

== Cast ==
- Peter Boyle as Erik Lonnrot
- Miguel Sandoval as Treviranus
- Christopher Eccleston as Alonso Zunz
- Zaide Silvia Gutierrez as Ms. Espinoza

== Home media release ==
The making of the soundtrack is discussed in a conversation between Cox and Wool on the DVD release.

This also includes a 1976 original film short titled Spiderweb, which is another interpretation of the same Borges short story. National Film School graduate Paul Miller made the 33 minute drama using actor Nigel Hawthorne in one of his first screen roles.

== Reception ==
On the review aggregator website Rotten Tomatoes, 17% of 6 critics' reviews are positive.
