= Smoke damage =

Smoke damage may refer to:

- Damage caused by exposure to smoke
- "Smoke Damage", an episode of the TV series Medium
