= Spiderweb (film) =

- Directed by: Paul Miller
- Based on: "Death and the Compass" by Jorge Luis Borges
- Starring: Nigel Hawthorne; Gabor Vernon; Harry Tierney; Ray Marioni; Helen Elliot; Harry Webster; Mike Bradsell
- Release date: 1976
- Running time: 33 min.
- Country: United Kingdom
- Language: English

Spiderweb (1976) is a British short film directed by National Film and Television School graduate Paul Miller. It is a fairly faithful adaptation of "Death and the Compass", a 1942 short story by Argentine writer Jorge Luis Borges (1899–1986). The site of the action, an unnamed city in the original story, is given as "Borgesia" at the beginning of the film.

Spiderweb is available as an "Extra" on the DVD of Alex Cox's 1996 Death and the Compass, a later adaptation of the same short-story.
