= Death and the Compass =

1942 short story by Jorge Luis Borges

- Short story by Jorge Luis Borges
- Original title: La muerte y la brújula
- Country: Argentina
- Language: Spanish
- Genre: Mystery short story

Publication
- Published in: sur
- Publisher: Editorial Sur
- Media type: Print
- Publication date: May 1942
- Published in English: 1954

"Death and the Compass" (original Spanish title: "La muerte y la brújula") is a short story by Argentine writer and poet Jorge Luis Borges (1899–1986). Published in Sur in May 1942, it was included in the 1944 collection Ficciones. It was translated into English by Anthony Kerrigan and published in New Mexico Quarterly (Autumn 1954). A new translation, by Donald A. Yates, was published in Labyrinths (short story collection), New Directions, 1962.

In the story, a detective, Erik Lönnrot, attempts to solve a mysterious series of murders which seem to follow a kabbalistic pattern. Appearances are misleading, however. By following what seem to be clues, the detective falls victim to his belief in abstract reason and to the man whom he presumes to be a criminal mastermind. In this way, "Death and the Compass" both observes and inverts the conventions of detective fiction. Literary critic Harold Bloom named it his favorite story by Borges.

== Plot summary ==
Lönnrot is a famous detective in an unnamed city that may or may not be Buenos Aires. When a rabbi is killed in his hotel room on the third of December, Lönnrot is assigned to the case. There is a cryptic message left on the rabbi's typewriter: "The first letter of the name has been uttered". The detective connects this cryptic message with the Tetragrammaton, the unspeakable four-letter name of God, and with his criminal nemesis Red Scharlach.

Exactly one month later, on the third of January, a second murder takes place with the message "The second letter of the name has been uttered" left at the crime site. Predictably, the same thing happens on the third of February, with the message reading "The last letter of the name has been uttered."

However, Lönnrot isn't convinced that the spree is at an end, as the Tetragrammaton contains four letters—two of them being the same letter repeated. Furthermore, he surmises the murders may actually have taken place on the fourth of December, January, and February, respectively, since a new day begins at sunset within the Jewish calendar (the murders were all committed at night). He predicts the next month will see one final killing.

In the meantime, the detective's office receives an anonymous tip to view the locations of the murders on a map, revealing how each coincides to the point of an equilateral triangle. Recognizing the southern end of the city has yet to be the scene of a murder in the series, Lönnrot extrapolates the fourth killing will complete a pattern to create a rhombus (the south appears frequently in Borges's writings as an allusion to the Argentine frontier, and by extension, as a symbol of solitude, lawlessness, and fate).

Lönnrot arrives at the site a day in advance, prepared to surprise the murderers. Instead, the detective is grabbed in the dark by two henchmen, and Scharlach emerges from the shadows.

Scharlach reveals his motive: Lönnrot arrested his brother who died in prison, and Scharlach vowed revenge. Killing the rabbi was not planned but the result of a robbery gone wrong. However, Scharlach realized Lönnrot's tendency to over-intellectualize could be manipulated against the detective. A report in the newspaper clued Scharlach to the fact Lönnrot was following a kabbalistic pattern to track the criminals) to lure Lönnrot to this place.

Lönnrot becomes calm in the face of his death and declares Scharlach made his maze too complex: instead of a four sided rhombus it should have been but a single line of murders, with each subsequent murder taking place on the halfway point (A 8 km from B, C 4 km from each, D 2 km from A and C). Lönnrot says philosophers have long been lost on this line, so a simple detective should feel no shame to do the same (a reference to Zeno's Paradox). Scharlach promises he will trap Lönnrot in this simpler labyrinth in their next "incarnation", and then kills him.

== Dramatic adaptations ==
- In 1967, The Firesign Theatre performed an adaptation of "Death and the Compass" on Radio Free Oz.
- In 1976, Paul Miller directed a 33-minute film adaptation of "Death and the Compass" called Spiderweb starring Nigel Hawthorne.
- In 1984, Alberto Manguel adapted "Death and the Compass" for the CBC Radio science fiction series Vanishing Point.
- In 1992, Alex Cox made a 55-minute English-language adaptation, suitable for television. Four years later, Alex Cox turned his first adaptation into Death and the Compass, later expanded into a feature film.
- In 2000, Jorge Leandro Colás directed his own version of the short story for Film Noir Producciones, La Muerte y la Brújula.
