= The Fragile Heart =

- Genre: Medical drama
- Created by: Paula Milne
- Written by: Paula Milne
- Directed by: Patrick Lau
- Starring: Nigel Hawthorne; Dearbhla Molloy; Helen McCrory; Dominic Mafham; Robert Langdon Lloyd; Sylvia Chang
- Composer: Gavin Greenaway
- Country of origin: United Kingdom
- Original language: English
- No. of series: 1
- No. of episodes: 3

Production
- Producer: Brian Eastman
- Cinematography: Nicholas D. Knowland
- Editor: Neil Thomson
- Running time: 55 minutes (including adverts)
- Production company: Carnival Film and Television

Original release
- Network: Channel 4
- Release: 6 November – 20 November 1996

The Fragile Heart is a BAFTA award-winning British medical drama television series created by Paula Milne and first aired on Channel 4 from 6 to 20 November 1996. The series was nominated for the Royal Television Society award for Best Drama Serial.

== Story ==
Edgar Pascoe (Nigel Hawthorne) is a highly successful and charismatic cardiac surgeon. Pre-eminent in his field, he is the embodiment of the upper echelons of medicine: urbane, assured, supremely confident in his own abilities. But he is not infallible - either in the operating theatre or in his private life with his divided family.

Edgar's wife Lileth (Dearbhla Molloy), a dedicated and compassionate country GP, is increasingly drawn to the holistic arts of healing still practiced in the East, but scorned by purveyors of Western technology. As their professional ideals and methods clash, so inevitably does their relationship. Nicola (Helen McCrory) is Edgar's favoured child, ruthless and unscrupulous in her ambition to emulate her illustrious father.

But it is in China, heading a medical delegation, that Edgar is confronted by an ethical dilemma over the abuse of human rights and is forced into a painful moral awakening which will prove to affect every area of his life.

== Cast ==
Actor	Role
Nigel Hawthorne	Dr. Edgar Pascoe
Dearbhla Molloy	Dr. Lileth Pascoe
Helen McCrory	Nicola Pascoe
Dominic Mafham	Daniel Pascoe
Robert Langford Lloyd	Dr. Maurice Denton
Sylvia Chang	Dr. Zhao Quing
Stewart Ong	Dr. Chen
Pao Han Lin	Wan Pu
John Hartley	Mrs. Youngman
Brenda Cavendish	Mrs. Youngman
Gareth Armstrong	Profusionist
Marian McLoughlin	Margaret Sedgely
Sebastian Abineri	Peter Sedgley
Ian Aspinall	Dilip
Adrian Pang	Lin Ling Tian
Simon Slater	Calder
Eamon Boland	Deviln
Terence Kemp	Mr. Bower-Kemp
Gordon Griffin	Flanders
Hi Ching	Hang
Leader Hawkins	Dr. Manville
Gabrielle Lloyd	Nancy Manville
Diana Payan	Mrs. Lawson
Vincent Marzello	Hugh Lyle

== Episode list ==
No.	Title	Original release date
1	"Part 1"	6 November 1996
2	"Part 2"	13 November 1996
3	"Part 3"	20 November 1996

== Award ==
- BAFTA Awards 1997
  - Won Best Actor: Nigel Hawthorne
  - Nominated Best Drama Serial: Brian Eastman, Patrick Lau, Paula Milne
  - Best Editing (Fiction/Entertainment): Neil Thomson
- Banff Television Festival 1997
  - Won Best Mini-Series : Paula Milne, Carnival Film & Television
- Royal Television Society, UK 1997
  - Nominated Best Drama Serial
  - Nominated Best Actor - Female : Dearbhla Molloy
- London Film Critics' Circle
  - Nominated Actress of the Year : Helen McCrory

== Home media ==
The Fragile Heart was released on DVD on 8 October 2018.
