= Dmitri Volkogonov =

Russian general and historian (1928–1995)

Special Advisor to the President of Russia on Defense and Security
- In office 24 September 1992 – 24 January 1994
- President: Boris Yeltsin

Personal details
- Born: Dmitri Antonovich Volkogonov; 22 March 1928 Chita, Far Eastern Krai, Russian SFSR, USSR
- Died: 6 December 1995 (aged 67) Moscow, Russia
- Resting place: Kuntsevo Cemetery
- Education: Oryol Armored School
- Alma mater: Lenin Military-Political Academy
- Occupation: Historian

Military service
- Allegiance: Soviet Union (to 1991); Russia
- Branch/service: Soviet Army; Russian Ground Forces
- Years of service: 1945–1995
- Rank: Colonel general

Dmitri Antonovich Volkogonov (Russian: Дми́трий Анто́нович Волкого́нов; 22 March 1928 – 6 December 1995) was a Soviet and Russian historian and colonel general who was head of the Soviet military's psychological warfare department. After research in secret Soviet archives (both before and after the dissolution of the union), he published a biography of Joseph Stalin and Vladimir Lenin, among others such as Leon Trotsky. Despite being a committed Stalinist and Marxist–Leninist for most of his career, Volkogonov came to repudiate communism and the Soviet system within the last decade of his life before his death from cancer in 1995.

Through his research in the restricted archives of the Soviet Central Committee, Volkogonov discovered facts that contradicted the official Soviet version of events, and the cult of personality that had been built up around Lenin and Stalin. Volkogonov published books that contributed to the strain of liberal Russian thought that emerged during Glasnost in the late 1980s and the post-Soviet era of the early 1990s. Among his other work, in the spring of 1992, President Boris Yeltsin appointed Volkogonov to lead a commission on establishing the Ministry of Defense of the Russian Federation.

== Early life ==
Volkogonov was born on 22 March 1928 in Chita, Eastern Siberia. Volkogonov was the son of a collective farm manager and a schoolteacher. In 1937, when he was eight, Volkogonov's father was arrested and shot during Stalin's purges for being found in possession of a pamphlet by Bukharin, who had fallen out of favor with Stalin and who was arrested that year. This was something Volkogonov only found out years later while doing his own research in the restricted archives in Moscow. His mother was sent to a labor camp, where she died during World War II. The family was "exiled to Krasnoyarsk in Western Siberia: Volkogonov joked that as they were already in the Far East, and Stalin was not in the habit of sending his political prisoners to Hawaii, they had to be sent west."

Volkogonov entered the military at the age of seventeen in 1945, which was common for many orphans. He studied at the Lenin Military-Political Academy in Moscow in 1961, transferring to the Soviet Army's propaganda department in 1970. There he wrote propaganda pamphlets and manuals on psychological warfare and gained a reputation as a hardliner.

It was as early as the 1950s, while a young Army officer, that Volkogonov first discovered information that created cognitive dissonance within himself. While reading early journals of Party members from the 1920s, Volkogonov realised "how stifled and sterile political debate in the Soviet Union had become in comparison to the early days." Khrushchev's 1956 secret speech further solidified this thought within him, but he kept these thoughts to himself at that time.

During the decades that Volkogonov headed the Department of Special Propaganda, he visited Angola, Ethiopia, the Middle East and Afghanistan. He "enjoyed a rapid rise in the Soviet Army as a specialist in charge of psychological and ideological warfare. Only a fully committed Communist could qualify for these posts, and he earned his credentials by grinding out propagandistic and agitational screeds." "But even as he was indoctrinating troops in Communist orthodoxy, General Volkogonov was struggling with private doubts based on the horrors he discovered hidden in the archives." Volkogonov also had the opportunity to view the conditions of various client states during the Cold War. While these countries received military aid, Volkogonov later recalled, "...they all became poorer; their economies were collapsing everywhere. And I came to the conclusion that the Marxist model was a real historic blind alley, and that we, too, were caught in a historic trap."

== Researching Stalin ==
Volkogonov was a fervent ideologue until the end of the 1970s, and devoted his energy to spreading Marxism–Leninism within the military. Only with the most impeccable communist credentials did Volkogonov access the most secret Soviet archives. While reading in the archives during the Brezhnev years, Volkogonov "found documents that astounded him — papers that revealed top Communists as cruel, dishonest and inept." Thus, while Volkogonov was actively writing and editing Soviet propaganda materials for troops, "[he] was engaged in a lengthy, tortured but very private process of re-evaluating Soviet history."

Volkogonov began writing his biography of Stalin in 1978. He completed it by 1983, but it was banned by the Central Committee. It was published under Mikhail Gorbachev's policy of Glasnost before the dissolution of the Soviet Union. The publication of the book on Stalin within Russia made Volkogonov "a pariah among his fellow senior officers".

Although Volkogonov approached Lenin in the Stalin biography in a rather conventional way, he was passionate in his indictment of the Stalinist system. As he later remarked, "It immediately made me many enemies."

"Volkogonov admitted publicly that, like many senior Soviet officials, he had lived two mental lives, rising higher and higher in his career while burrowing deeper in the archives, as if symbolically undermining the system that had nurtured him."

He had been director of the Institute of Military History since 1985, where he was heavily involved in research and writing. While there, Volkogonov compiled a two-volume collection of data on 45,000 Red Army officers who were arrested during the purges of the 1930s, in which 15,000 were shot.

While the Stalin biography caused friction, everything really came to a head in June 1991, when he was forced to resign. Volkogonov had shown the other senior officers at the Institute a draft of the first volume of a 10-volume official Soviet history of World War II. In it, Volkogonov criticised Stalin's management of the war and his liquidation of Soviet officers.

One British historian, summarising Volkogonov's criticisms of Stalin's military role in World War II, then notes that "a number of officers at the Institute of Military History who had fought on the Eastern Front were critical of Volkogonov's writings on the war because he had never set foot on a battlefield. He was, they said, an 'armchair-general'."

"Accused of blackening the name of the army, as well as that of the Communist Party and the Soviet state, and personally attacked by Minister of Defense Yazov," and under pressure from Gorbachev, Volkogonov resigned.

== Advisor to Yeltsin and 1990s stances ==
After the failed 1991 Soviet coup d'état attempt by communist hardliners in August 1991, followed by the dissolution of the Soviet Union in December 1991, Volkogonov became the special adviser for defence issues to the Russian president Boris Yeltsin.

In the early 1990s, Volkogonov was "the chairman of the commission investigating the hitherto unknown fates of allied prisoners of war in Soviet camps, chairman of the parliamentary committee for KGB and Communist Party archives". The second parliamentary committee released 78 million files to public access. As part of this process, Volkogonov was able to personally review "many documents of the Communist Party Central Committee and the Politburo". This declassification of state and Party papers allowed historians access which had never been allowed going back to the early formation of the Soviet Union seventy years before.

From July 20, 1991 he served as Advisor to the President of the Russian Federation on Defense Issues.

From December 31, 1991 he was a member of the Commission for Determining the List of Documents of the Archives of the President of the Russian Federation.

From January 29, 1992 he was a member of the State Delegation of the Russian Federation for the Preparation of Agreements between the Russian Federation and the States of the Former Union Republics on the Whole Range of Military-Political Issues.

From February 22, 1992 he was a member of the Government Commission for the Use of State Property Owned by the Former Institute of the Theory and History of Socialism of the Central Committee of the CPSU.

From April 3, 1992 he was a member of the Presidential Advisory Council.

From April 4, 1992 he served as chairman of the State Commission for the Creation of the Ministry of Defense, Army, and Navy of the Russian Federation. From September 24, 1992 to January 24, 1994, he served as Advisor to the President of the Russian Federation on Defense and Security Issues.

On October 2, 1992, the presidential order appointing him Advisor to the President of Russia on Defense Issues was declared invalid.

From June 3, 1993, he served as Representative of the President of the Russian Federation for participation in the Constitutional Assembly.

When notice of Volkogonov's research became known in the West, inquiries came to him from Alger Hiss and his lawyer in the United States. In 1948, Hiss had been accused of being a spy for the Soviet Union. When Hiss's lawyer contacted Volkogonov to check the KGB archives for record of Hiss as a spy, The New York Times reported:

"Not a single document, and a great amount of materials has been studied, substantiates the allegation that Mr. A. Hiss collaborated with the intelligence services of the Soviet Union," the official, Gen. Dmitry A. Volkogonov, chairman of the Russian Government's military intelligence archives, declared. He called the espionage accusations against Mr. Hiss "completely groundless."

Later Volkogonov took issue with what amounted to exoneration of Hiss. In a New York Times article entitled "Russian General Retreats on Hiss," Volkogonov clarified:

"I was not properly understood... The Ministry of Defense also has an intelligence service, which is totally different, and many documents have been destroyed. I only looked through what the K.G.B. had. All I said was that I saw no evidence."

Responding to Volkogonov's last remarks, Hiss himself stated: "If he and his associates haven't examined all the files, I hope they will examine the others, and they will show the same thing."

Volkogonov co-chaired a U.S.-Russia Joint Commission on Prisoners of War, "and continued, always, to write." Volkogonov fell out of favor with Yeltsin in 1994, after opposing the use of force to solve ethnic disputes within areas of the former Soviet Union. Specifically, Volkogonov felt that Yeltsin was taking "the advice of wrong-headed counselors" in deciding to invade Chechnya.

== Biography of Lenin and Critique of Leninism ==
Although Volkogonov began intensive research into Lenin in 1990, by the late 1980s he was actually already arriving at his own conclusion regarding Lenin's role. He eventually became thoroughly disillusioned with Leninism.

Lenin's archives were housed in the former Central Committee building on Moscow's Staraya Square. Deep in the basement of the huge grey building were shelves holding metal boxes that contained all the written records associated with Lenin. Volkogonov explained, "As I saw more and more closed Soviet archives, as well as the large Western collections at Harvard University and the Hoover Institution in California, Lenin's profile altered in my estimation."

Volkogonov always used to say "that in his own mind, Lenin was the last bastion to fall." He said that the turning point was when he discovered one of Lenin's orders calling for the public hanging of Kulak peasants in 1918:

Hang (hang without fail, so the people see) no fewer than one hundred known kulaks, rich men, bloodsuckers...Do it in such a way that for hundreds of versts around, the people will see, tremble, know, shout: they are strangling and will strangle to death the bloodsucking kulaks.

"It never occurred to us", he wrote, "that the 'breakthrough' of October 1917 might be a counter-revolution, when compared to the events of February of that year."

== Character ==
When Volkogonov's editor for the English editions of his books, Harold Shukman, first met him in Oxford, England in 1989, he found Volkogonov to be "utterly unlike [his] idea of a Soviet general". Shukman explained: "He did not strut or swagger, or drink or smoke, and in the many different situations in which I was to see him — in other countries, in Russia, with academics, etc., he was invariably easy-going and relaxed, and plainly popular."

it was only late in my life, after long and tortuous inner struggle, that I was able to free myself of the chimera of Bolshevik Ideology. I felt enormous relief, and at the same time a sense of deep regret that I had wasted so many years in Utopian captivity. Perhaps the only thing I achieved in this life was to break with the faith I had held for so long...Disillusionment first came to me as an idea, rather like the melancholy of a spiritual hangover. Then, it came as intellectual confusion. Finally, as the determination to confront the truth and understand it...

— Dmitri Volkogonov, Introduction, Autopsy For An Empire

By the end of his life, Volkogonov had "firmly committed himself to the view that Russia's only hope in 1917 lay in the liberal and social democratic coalition that emerged in the February Revolution."

Volkogonov told his editor that the "spiritual strength" that he displayed in his last years was derived from undergoing a Christian baptism. As one Los Angeles Times writer described Volkogonov: "For exposing truths and exploding myths, Volkogonov was often accused of treason and treachery. But he never retreated." Volkogonov was under tremendous pressures at the time. For instance he related that when he would enter the Russian Parliament (where he had held a seat as a liberal since the Gorbachev era), he would be met by Communist legislators who would "line up at the door and shout insults." Of this Volkogonov commented at the time, "I take these shouts as sounds of historical praise."

== Last years ==
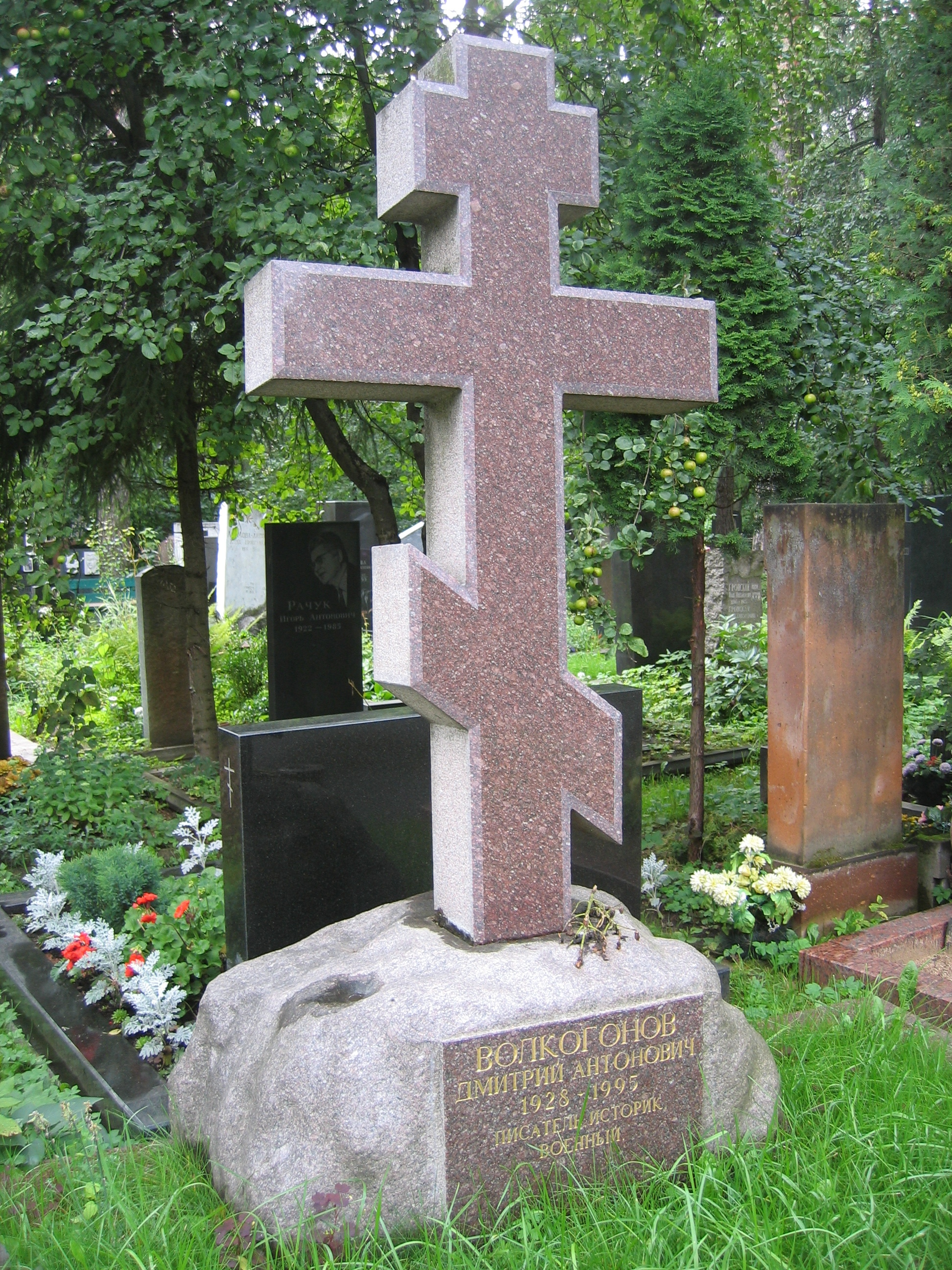
Volkogonov's gravestone in Moscow

"Despite his undergoing extensive surgery for colon and liver cancer" in 1991, the pace of both his political activity and the publication of his writings increased sharply.

During the August 1991 coup attempt in which a hardliners attempted to wrest control from Gorbachev in an attempt to reassert the Communist Party's power in the Soviet Union, Volkogonov was in a hospital in London. When Volkogonov saw the news of the coup on television, he said to his editor, "So, they've done it." Defense Minister Dmitry Yazov, who had fired Volkogonov from the Institute three months earlier, had told him, "something will happen to get rid of the likes of you." From his hospital bed Volkogonov broadcast an appeal on the BBC to the Soviet army to not obey the orders of the coup leaders.

Volkogonov was the co-chairman of Task Force Russia, an American Russian organisation tasked with finding American POWs in Russia. He told a US Senate committee that 730 American airmen had been captured on Cold War spy flights.

In October 1993, he took an active part in the dispersal of the Congress of People's Deputies and the Supreme Soviet of Russia, serving as an aide to Deputy Defense Minister Konstantin Kobets. He was deputy head of the task force tasked with storming the Supreme Soviet. (According to Deputy Speaker of the Supreme Soviet Yuri Voronin, at the height of the shelling of the White House, he told him over the phone: "The situation has changed. The President, as Supreme Commander-in-Chief, signed a decree to the Minister of Defense to storm the House of Soviets and assumed full responsibility. We will suppress the putsch at any cost. Order in Moscow will be restored by the army".)

In 1993, he was elected to the State Duma of the Federal Assembly of Russia of the first convocation, where he was a member of the Choice of Russia faction and the Defense Committee.

Since March 1994, he has been a member of the initiative group of the Democratic Choice of Russia – United Democrats party. From October 21, 1993 to January 26, 1994, he was entrusted with the leadership, on a voluntary basis, of the commission under the president of the Russian Federation for the investigation of the disappearance without a trace of citizens of foreign states, as well as Russian citizens who disappeared under unclear circumstances outside the borders of the former Soviet Union.

Since February 17, 1994 he was a member of the Council on Personnel Policy under the president of the Russian Federation. Since August 18, 1994 he was a member of the Expert-Analytical Council under the president of the Russian Federation. Since September 22, 1994 he was a member of the Commission on Declassification of Documents. Since November 8, 1994 he served as chairman of the Commission under the President of the Russian Federation on Prisoners of War, Internees, and Missing Persons.

He worked until the last day of his life. He died of stomach cancer on December 6, 1995 in Moscow. He was buried at Kuntsevo Cemetery. His family donated his papers to the United States Library of Congress.

Volkogonov is most famous for his trilogy Leaders (Вожди, or Vozhdi), which consists of the three books about: Vladimir Lenin (Lenin: A New Biography, 1994); Leon Trotsky (Trotsky: The Eternal Revolutionary, 1992); and Joseph Stalin (Stalin: Triumph and Tragedy).

He also finished just before his death Autopsy for an Empire: the Seven Leaders Who Built the Soviet Regime (Russian title: Sem Vozhdei). The book presents chapters on "the seven leaders of the Soviet Union: Lenin, Stalin, Khrushchev, Brezhnev, Andropov, Chernenko and Gorbachev." Volkogonov was in the Soviet Army during the reign of six of the seven leaders, and he had "direct working contact" with four of those leaders in his role as a colonel-general. The English editions were essentially condensed versions of the much longer Russian originals, as acknowledged by their translator and editor Harold Shukman.

== Reception of works ==
His biographical work, notably on Trotsky, have also attracted varied reception. Some reviewers have argued he provides overwhelming evidence of the former’s ruthlessness in the name of the revolution. Conversely, other writers such as Daniel Singer have claimed bias in his historical interpretation to “proclaim that Marxism is evil and revolution is wrong”, superficial assessment of the ideological formulations and compared his book unfavourably to the Deutscher trilogy. French historian Pierre Broué has also disputed the historical assessments by modern historians such as Volkogonov in which he argued had falsely equated Leninism, Stalinism and Trotskyism to present the notion of ideological continuity.

== Awards ==
- Order "For Merit to the Fatherland"
- Order of the Red Banner of Labour
- Order of the Red Star
- Order "For Service to the Homeland in the Armed Forces of the USSR"
- Order of the Badge of Honour
- Jubilee Medal "In Commemoration of the 100th Anniversary of the Birth of Vladimir Ilyich Lenin"
- Medal "For Distinction in Guarding the State Border of the USSR"
- Jubilee Medal "Twenty Years of Victory in the Great Patriotic War 1941–1945"
- Medal "Veteran of the Armed Forces of the USSR"
- Medal "For Strengthening of Brotherhood in Arms"
- Medal "For Construction of the Baikal-Amur Railway"
- Jubilee Medal "40 Years of the Armed Forces of the USSR"
- Jubilee Medal "50 Years of the Armed Forces of the USSR"
- Jubilee Medal "60 Years of the Armed Forces of the USSR"
- Jubilee Medal "70 Years of the Armed Forces of the USSR"
- Medal "For Impeccable Service"
- State Prize of the Russian Federation
- Lenin Komsomol Prize
- Order "For Military Merit"
- Medal "50 Years of the Mongolian People's Revolution"
- Medal "50 Years of the Mongolian People's Army
- Order of the National Flag
- Order of 9 September 1944

== Works ==
- Mythical "Threat" and the Real Danger to Peace, Novosti Press Agency Publishing House, 1982
- The Psychological War, Progress Publishers, 1986
- The Army and Social Progress, Progress Publishers, 1987
- Stalin: Triumph and Tragedy, Grove Weidenfeld, 1991 ISBN 978-0-8021-1165-4
- Volkogonov, Dmitry (1994). Lenin: A New Biography. Translated by Shukman, Harold. London: HarperCollins. ISBN 978-0-00-255123-6.
- Credited as a Historical Consultant for Russia's War: Blood upon the Snow television documentary series.
- Trotsky: The Eternal Revolutionary, Free Press, 1996 ISBN 978-0-684-82293-8
- The Rise and Fall of the Soviet Empire: Political Leaders from Lenin to Gorbachev, HarperCollins Publishers, 1998 ISBN 978-0-00-255791-7
- Autopsy for an Empire: The Seven Leaders Who Built the Soviet Regime, Free Press, 1999 ISBN 978-0-684-87112-7

== See also ==
- List of members of the State Duma of Russia who died in office
