= Alfred Liskow =

German soldier and deserter

- Born: 1910; Kolberg, Germany
- Died: Unknown
- Other name: Liskov
- Military career
- Allegiance: Nazi Germany (until 1941); Soviet Union
- Branch: German Army
- Service years: 1939–1941
- Unit: Infantry Regiment 222, 75th Infantry Division
- Conflicts: World War II
- Other work: Political member of the Comintern

Alfred Liskow (also spelled Liskov or Liskof; first name sometimes given as Albert; Russian: Альфред Германович Лисков, romanized: Alfred Germanovich Liskov; 1910 – unknown) was a German soldier and deserter who swam across the Bug River at 9:00 pm on the eve of Operation Barbarossa near Sokal, just north of Lwow, in 1941 to warn the Red Army of imminent attack the next morning.

== Early life ==
Alfred Liskow was born in 1910. Before joining the German military in 1939, he worked as a furniture maker at a furniture factory in Kolberg. He was a dedicated Communist and at one point a member of the Roter Frontkämpferbund.

== Military career ==
Liskow served at Infantry Regiment 222 of the 75th Infantry Division stationed on the eve of the invasion north to the town Sokal (north to Lwow). After learning about Germany's plans to invade the Soviet Union, he left his military unit to warn the Soviets. He swam across the Bug river on 21 June 1941 and surrendered to the Soviet border patrol soldiers of the 90th Border Unit at about 9:00 pm. During questioning, he said that at dawn on 22 June, the German Wehrmacht would attack.

=== Defection ===
After his defection, the Soviet authorities used Liskow for their propaganda. One of the quotes attributed to him was "I am from a family of workers, from Kolberg. My parents and I hate Hitler and his regime. For us, the USSR is a friendly country, and we don't want to fight with the Soviet people. There are many such families in Germany. They don't want a war with you." Despite this, he was arrested in January 1942 and sent to a Soviet prisoner camp. During his time in prison, Liskow showed signs of mental illness, though it is unclear if such mental illness was real. Liskow was rehabilitated on 16 July 1942 and sent to Siberia, where all traces of him were lost. It is believed that Liskow died in unknown circumstances near Novosibirsk in late 1943; however, this has never been confirmed.

Stalin later ordered the execution of a German deserter for "misinformation", though it is unclear if this refers to Liskow or another German deserter.
