= Medium season 7 =

Medium
- Season 7
- DVD cover
- No. of episodes: 13

Release
- Original network: CBS
- Original release: September 24, 2010 – January 21, 2011

Season chronology
- ← Previous; Season 6

The seventh and final season of Medium, an American television series, premiered on CBS September 24, 2010 and ended on January 21, 2011. The season premiered to only 6.10 million viewers while the season and series finale got 7.87 million viewers—the highest in over a year since 6.12 on January 15, 2010. This is the last season on CBS until its cancellation in 2010.

== Production ==
CBS renewed Medium for a seventh season in May 2010, and was moved into the 8:00pm Friday night slot replacing the cancelled Ghost Whisperer. On October 26, 2010, CBS cut the episode order from 22 down to 13, due to ratings erosion. On November 15, 2010, Patricia Arquette told Entertainment Weekly that the show "got canceled" and had only two more episodes to shoot. She also said the writers were excited that they would be able to end the show properly. On November 18, 2010, series creator Glenn Gordon Caron posted to both the Medium Facebook page and the CBS forums, stating that the show had been canceled and that the series finale would be broadcast on January 21, 2011. CBS confirmed the cancellation with a press release on December 21, 2010, which also confirmed the series finale date of January 21.

== Plot ==
Ariel departs for Dartmouth College this season. Allison and Joe's relationship begins to dwindle, with the two not seeing eye to eye on everything from work to the girls, to waking up to a "different" Allison every day. In the season four's "Burn Baby Burn" episode Allison tells Joe's mother Marjorie that she will be fine, however in season seven Marjorie passes away from cancer in the episode Blood on the Tracks and she warns Allison about the darkness ahead of them.

Lee Scanlon deals with his deceased brother for a few episodes and admits to Allison that he had let him be killed. Devalos decides to run for Mayor of Phoenix, and Allison and Joe both plan to enroll in school which causes tension between them. Allison's half brother Michael returns after a three-season absence, this time played by Patricia's real life brother David Arquette (Ryan Hurst was unavailable due to commitments to Sons of Anarchy).

In the series finale, Joe is killed in a plane crash on his way back from a business trip in Hawaii. Seven years later, Allison has become the assistant DA, Devalos has become the Mayor. 14-year-old Marie is the last DuBois child still living at home, as Bridgette is in college and not present in the episode and a pregnant and married Ariel remains on the East Coast. While Allison is working on a trial, she seems to have visions of Joe actually surviving the crash but with amnesia. Allison makes a decision to find Joe, sacrificing her own career and her life in the United States. Only to have Joe wake her and confirm his death in the crash. He wanted to give her hope for the future in the dream of a life without him. Her inability to let him go took the dream on a path he didn't intend, forcing him to wake her and confirm his death. In a flash forward they are reunited after Allison dies.

== Cast and characters ==
=== Main cast ===
- Patricia Arquette as Allison DuBois
- Jake Weber as Joe DuBois
- Miguel Sandoval as Manuel Devalos
- David Cubitt as Lee Scanlon
- Sofia Vassilieva as Ariel DuBois
- Feodor Lark as Bridgette DuBois

=== Recurring cast ===
- Madison and Miranda Carabello as Marie DuBois
- Bruce Gray as the ghost of Joe DuBois' father; the viewer never learns his first name
- Tina DiJoseph as Lynn DiNovi
- Kathy Baker as Marjorie DuBois, Joe's mother
- Roxanne Hart as Lily Devalos
- Dean Norris as Scanlon's deceased brother
- David Arquette as Allison Dubois's brother, Michael
- John Glover as Carson Churchill

== Episodes ==
No. overall	No. in season	Title	Directed by	Written by	Original release date	U.S. viewers (millions)
118	1	"Bring Your Daughter to Work Day"	Aaron Lipstadt	Michael Narducci	September 24, 2010	6.10
A missing homeless man is featured in the dreams of Allison and Bridgette that results in the two switching bodies, sending Allison to school and Bridgette to the office. When the homeless man is murdered, Allison and Bridgette soon realize they were swapped for a reason and must put the pieces of the case together to swap back.
119	2	"The Match Game"	Larry Teng	Denise Thé	October 1, 2010	5.95
Visions of symbols floating over people's heads make Allison think they could be used to find their perfect mates. She is very mistaken. Playing matchmaker based on the symbols, with unimaginable consequences, Allison arranges a date between a restaurateur, Gil, and a doctor, Judy, only to dream of Gil murdering Judy in the process. Meanwhile, Joe must figure out what to do when a female employee ostensibly accuses a male co-worker of sexual harassment.
120	3	"Means and Ends"	Aaron Lipstadt	Tim Talbott	October 8, 2010	6.08
Allison is worried about Scanlon, who is being haunted by dreams about his dead brother Paul, beginning with his brother taking a beating from their dad for Scanlon when they were kids. Meanwhile, Ariel's final plans for college are interrupted by visions of a missing young woman.
121	4	"How to Kill a Good Guy"	Larry Teng	Geoffrey Geib	October 15, 2010	5.93
Allison's investigation of a missing girl's murder may have a link to Scanlon's late brother. She lets the local sheriff know, which further erodes her relationship with Scanlon who yells at her for not letting him know first. Bridgette and Marie must deal with Ariel heading off to college as Ariel's dead grandfather suggests she help them cope with her departure.
122	5	"Talk to the Hand"	Colin Bucksey	Robert Doherty & Craig Sweeny	October 22, 2010	6.54
Allison burns her hand in the kitchen requiring a skin graft. After surgery, she learns the graft came from a dead person and finds that the hand has a mind of its own, tying her into a case involving a missing woman who had uncovered an illegal tissue donor operation. Meanwhile, Bridgette isn't telling her parents the whole truth about her involvement on the school soccer team.
123	6	"Where Were You When?"	Peter Werner	Jordan Rosenberg	October 29, 2010	6.83
Allison's flashes to the future leave her feeling powerless to stop an upcoming catastrophic event in which a bomb explodes in an office building at 9:18 a.m., but she doesn't know which day.
124	7	"Native Tongue"	Aaron Lipstadt	Arika Lisanne Mittman	November 5, 2010	6.97
Allison suddenly is unable to understand spoken English when she wakes up after having a dream involving a Navajo Indian being burned to death by a man in a flameproof suit. This results in her developing a friendship with a linguist named Jane (Judy Reyes) who translates for her. The situation tries Joe's patience as he thinks about how many strange situations he's had to put up with during their marriage.
125	8	"Smoke Damage"	Vincent Misiano	Corey Reed & Travis Donnelly	November 12, 2010	6.88
A series of mysterious fire-related deaths may be tied to Allison's dreams of a blaze in which a girl is trapped in a burning building. Allison must also think about where her professional career is headed as Devalos starts thinking seriously about running for mayor against a family friend.
126	9	"The People in Your Neighborhood"	Peter Werner	Arika Lisanne Mittman & Jordan Rosenberg & Denise Thé	November 19, 2010	7.31
Allison's visions about a convicted sex offender named Clark who moves into her neighborhood have her questioning his guilt. When neighbors try to get Clark out of the neighborhood, a 16-year-old girl is found dead. When the evidence seems to point to Clark, he takes his own life believing he will be charged with the murder. Allison uncovers the truth and finds out who really did it.
127	10	"Blood on the Tracks"	Aaron Lipstadt	Geoff Geib	December 3, 2010	6.65
Allison dreams of a murder about a man who is struck by a train. When a man is killed just like in her dream, Allison is convinced it's a homicide. Meanwhile, Joe has difficulty handling his mother's cancer diagnosis. Allison urges Joe to visit his mother in the hospital where he discovers she's dying but has no will. She believes she will recover because of something Allison told her in the past, but Joe tells her that Allison lied to give her hope, and she creates a will before she dies.
128	11	"Only Half Lucky"	Larry Reibman	Corey Reed & Travis Donnelly	January 7, 2011	6.90
Allison's dream arouses suspicion regarding her brother Michael (David Arquette replaced Ryan Hurst who played Michael in seasons 1–3 due to unavailability), who tries to kill himself, but when she calls him the next day, she finds out he's traveling to Phoenix for business. Bridgette's abilities pique the interest of Devalos's campaign manager who has a shady past, which leads to Devalos firing her.
129	12	"Labor Pains"	Miguel Sandoval	Tim Talbott	January 14, 2011	6.61
Allison is pestered by Jeremy, who believes his wife didn't leave him and wants Allison to dream about the truth. She promises to read his file on her way out of town, but at the airport he kidnaps her and drugs her to help her sleep and dream. She eventually links his missing wife with a current murder D.A. was investigating. Jeremy's wife was murdered and her baby was raised by the killer. Allison drops the charges against Jeremy and reunites him with his child. Teachers think Marie has a learning disability but Joe realizes it's connected to the solution to his work problem.
130	13	"Me Without You"	Peter Werner	Craig Sweeny & Robert Doherty & Glenn Gordon Caron	January 21, 2011	7.87
In the series finale, Allison has to delve through her dreams one final time after Joe dies in an airplane crash. She's actually woken up by the phone ringing, Joe should be arriving earlier than planned, he tells her. Then, turbulences occur, and Allison witnesses the plane's going down, and Joe's death over the phone, with a dramatic final 'I love you Allison, with all my heart' as the plane plunges. Seven years later and at last a successful lawyer, and the DA's first assistant, Allison must confront a drug smuggler who seemingly orders the death of the new DA during his prosecution, forcing Mayor Manuel Devalos to keep Allison from destroying her own career when her dreams and the criminal suggest that Joe has been alive all along. But Allison's dream is in fact false, or to be precise, all the flashforward 7 years into the future is actually a dream of what can happen, given to Allison by Joe himself. She wakes up in the present, when the dream within a dream finally awakens her, by the voice of Joe, instead of the phone ringing. We are left to believe that the final call from Joe was part of the whole dream, too, though nothing is completely ascertained in that regard. Allison turns around in her bed, imagining she'll find Joe by her side, but only to find Joe's ghost talking to her. He tells her that he in fact did die in the plane crash. He tells her that he wanted to make her dream of how things could be without him, but that even in the dream, she wanted so bad that he'd still be alive, that she in fact 'took back the control' over the dream, and invented the case about the drug smuggler, and the beach in Mexico, and Joe surviving the crash. He tells her to accept his absence, that she has to let go. Then he moves back, and disappears, leaving Allison crying and pleading. We then jump 41 years into the future, in the year 2052, where an elderly Allison is living in a retirement home and is listening to her great granddaughter leave her a message on her answering machine. Minutes later, Allison passes away. She is then shown to be reuniting with Joe in the way she looked 41 years prior.

== United States ratings ==
Episode number	Title	Original airing	HH Rating	Share	Rating/share (18–49)	Total viewers (in millions)	Note
118 (7-01)	Bring Your Daughter to Work Day	September 24, 2010	4.0	8	1.4	6.102	
119 (7-02)	The Match Game	October 1, 2010	3.2	6	1.2	5.953	
120 (7-03)	Means and Ends	October 8, 2010	3.8	7	1.2	6.082	
121 (7-04)	How to Kill a Good Guy	October 15, 2010	3.9	8	1.1	5.931	
122 (7-05)	Talk to the Hand	October 22, 2010	4.2	8	1.4	6.539	
123 (7-06)	Where Were You When...?	October 29, 2010	4.3	8	1.4	6.827	
124 (7-07)	Native Tongue	November 5, 2010	4.5	8	1.5	6.969	
125 (7-08)	Smoke Damage	November 12, 2010	4.3	8	1.4	6.877	
126 (7-09)	The People in Your Neighborhood	November 19, 2010	4.6	8	1.4	7.312	
127 (7-10)	Blood on the Tracks	December 3, 2010	4.3	8	1.4	6.653	
128 (7-11)	Only Half Lucky	January 7, 2011	4.3	8	1.4	6.899	
129 (7-12)	Labor Pains	January 14, 2011	4.2	8	1.3	6.609	
130 (7-13)	Me Without You	January 21, 2011	4.9	9	1.6	7.866	
