= Nigel Hawthorne =

English actor (1929–2001)

Sir Nigel Hawthorne CBE
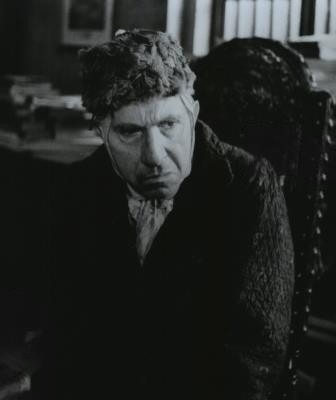
- Hawthorne in The Miser (1988)
- Born: Nigel Barnard Hawthorne; 5 April 1929; Coventry, Warwickshire, England
- Died: 26 December 2001 (aged 72); Cold Christmas, Hertfordshire, England
- Occupation: Actor
- Years active: 1950–2001
- Partner: Trevor Bentham (1979–2001)

Sir Nigel Barnard Hawthorne (5 April 1929 – 26 December 2001) was an English actor. He is known for his stage acting and his portrayal of Sir Humphrey Appleby, the permanent secretary in the 1980s sitcom Yes Minister and the Cabinet Secretary in its sequel, Yes, Prime Minister. For this role, he won four British Academy Television Awards for Best Entertainment Performance.

He won the BAFTA Award for Best Lead Actor and was nominated for the Academy Award in the same category for portraying King George III in The Madness of King George (1994), having previously won the Laurence Olivier Award for the stage version. He later won the British Academy Television Award for Best Actor, for the 1996 series The Fragile Heart. He won the Tony Award for Best Actor in a Play winner for his performance in 1991 Broadway production of Shadowlands.

== Life and career ==
=== Early years ===
Hawthorne was born on 5 April 1929 in Coventry, Warwickshire (now West Midlands), the second of four children of Agnes Rosemary (née Rice) and Charles Barnard Hawthorne, a physician.

When Hawthorne was three years old, the family moved to Cape Town, South Africa, where his father had bought a practice. Initially they lived in Gardens and then moved to a newly built house near Camps Bay.

He attended St George's Grammar School, Cape Town, and, although the family was not Catholic, a now-defunct Christian Brothers College, where he played in the rugby team. He described his time at the latter as not being a particularly happy experience.

He enrolled at the University of Cape Town, where he met and sometimes acted in plays with Theo Aronson (later a well-known biographer), but withdrew and returned to the United Kingdom in the 1950s to pursue a career in acting.

=== Acting career ===
Hawthorne made his professional stage debut in 1950, playing Archie Fellows in a Cape Town production of The Shop at Sly Corner. Unhappy in South Africa, he decided to move to London, where he performed in various small parts including an appearance in a 1969 episode of the comedy series Dad's Army.

Finding success in London, Hawthorne decided to try his luck in New York City and eventually got a part in a 1974 production of As You Like It on Broadway. Around this time, he was persuaded by Ian McKellen and Judi Dench to join the Royal Shakespeare Company. He also supplemented his income by appearing in television advertisements, including one for Mackeson Stout, and in the early 1990s starred alongside Tom Conti in a long-running series of commercials for Vauxhall.

He returned to the New York stage in 1990 in Shadowlands and won the 1991 Tony Award for Best Actor in a Play.

Although Hawthorne had appeared in small roles in various British television series since the late 1950s, such as reformed ex-con Worm Wellings in an episode of Going Straight opposite Ronnie Barker, one of his most famous roles was as Sir Humphrey Appleby, the Permanent Secretary of the fictional Department of Administrative Affairs in the television series Yes Minister (and Cabinet Secretary in its sequel, Yes, Prime Minister), for which he won four BAFTA awards during the 1980s. He became a household name throughout the United Kingdom, which opened the doors to film roles.

In 1982, Hawthorne appeared in Richard Attenborough's Gandhi, alongside a cast including Martin Sheen, John Mills, Candice Bergen, John Gielgud, Ian Charleson, and Ben Kingsley. The same year, he starred opposite Clint Eastwood in the Cold War thriller Firefox, where he played a dissident Russian scientist. Other film roles during this time included Demolition Man.

This period led into Hawthorne's role of King George III in Alan Bennett's stage play The Madness of George III (for which he won a Best Actor Olivier Award) and the film adaptation titled The Madness of King George, for which he received an Academy Award nomination for Best Actor and won the BAFTA Film Award for Best Actor.

After this success, Hawthorne's friend Ian McKellen asked him to play his doomed brother, Clarence, in Richard III, and Steven Spielberg asked him to play lame-duck president Martin Van Buren in Amistad. He won a sixth BAFTA for the 1996 TV mini-series The Fragile Heart. He also drew praise for his role of Georgie Pillson in the London Weekend Television series Mapp and Lucia.

Hawthorne was also a voice actor and lent his voice to two Disney films: Fflewddur Fflam in The Black Cauldron (1985) and Professor Porter in Tarzan (1999). He also voiced Captain Campion in the animated film adaptation of Watership Down (1978).

=== Personal life ===
An intensely private person, Hawthorne was annoyed at having been outed as gay in 1995 in the publicity surrounding the 67th Academy Awards, but attended the ceremony with his long-time partner, Trevor Bentham and afterwards spoke openly about being gay in interviews and in his autobiography, Straight Face, that was published posthumously.

Hawthorne met Bentham in 1968 when the latter was stage-managing the Royal Court Theatre. From 1979 until Hawthorne's death in 2001 they lived together in Radwell and then at Thundridge, both in Hertfordshire. The two of them became fund-raisers for the North Hertfordshire hospice and other local charities.

=== Death ===
Hawthorne died from a heart attack at his home on 26 December 2001, aged 72. He had recently undergone several operations for pancreatic cancer, which he was diagnosed with in mid-2000, but had been discharged from hospital for the Christmas holidays. His funeral service was held at St Mary's, the parish church of Thundridge near Ware, Hertfordshire, following which he was cremated at Stevenage Crematorium. His funeral was attended by Derek Fowlds, who had played Bernard in Yes, Minister and Yes, Prime Minister, Maureen Lipman, Charles Dance, Loretta Swit, and Frederick Forsyth along with friends and local people. The service was led by the Right Reverend Christopher Herbert, the Bishop of St Albans. The coffin had a wreath of white lilies and orchids and Bentham was one of the pallbearers.

On hearing of Hawthorne's death Alan Bennett described him in his diary: "Courteous, grand, a man of the world and superb at what he did, with his technique never so obvious as to become familiar as, say, Olivier's did or Alec Guinness's."

== Acting credits ==
=== Film ===
| Year | Title | Role | Notes |
|---|---|---|---|
| 1958 | Carve Her Name with Pride | Polish Soldier in Park | Uncredited |
| 1972 | Young Winston | Boer Sentry | Uncredited |
| 1974 | S*P*Y*S | Croft | Parody / Action / Comedy |
| 1975 | The Hiding Place | Pastor De Ruiter | Prison Drama / History |
| 1975 | Decisions, Decisions | Unknown | Short |
| 1977 | Spiderweb | Lonnrot | Short |
| 1978 | Sweeney 2 | Dilke | Action / Crime / Thriller |
| 1978 | Watership Down | Captain Campion | Voice, credited as Nigel Hawthorn |
| 1978 | The Sailor's Return | Mr Fosse | Drama |
| 1981 | History of the World: Part I | Citizen Official | (The French Revolution) |
| 1981 | Memoirs of a Survivor | Victorian Father | Sci-Fi |
| 1982 | Firefox | Dr Pyotr Baranovich | Adventure / Action / Thriller |
| 1982 | The Plague Dogs | Dr Boycott | Voice |
| 1982 | Gandhi | Kinnoch | |
| 1983 | Dead on Time | Doctor | Short |
| 1984 | The Chain | Mr Thorn | |
| 1985 | The Black Cauldron | Fflewddur Fflam | Voice |
| 1985 | Turtle Diary | The Publisher | |
| 1988 | Rarg | The Storyteller | Short film |
| 1989 | A Handful of Time | Ted Walker | |
| 1990 | King of the Wind | Achmet | |
| 1992 | Freddie as F.R.O.7. | Brigadier General | Voice |
| 1993 | Demolition Man | Dr Raymond Cocteau | |
| 1994 | The Madness of King George | King George III | |
| 1995 | Richard III | Clarence | |
| 1996 | Twelfth Night or What You Will | Malvolio | |
| 1997 | Murder in Mind | Dr Ellis | Also associate producer |
| 1997 | Amistad | President Martin Van Buren | |
| 1998 | The Object of My Affection | Rodney Fraser | |
| 1998 | Madeline | Lord Covington | (segment "Lord Cucuface") |
| 1998 | At Sachem Farm | Uncle Cullen | Also executive producer |
| 1999 | The Big Brass Ring | Kim | |
| 1999 | The Winslow Boy | Arthur Winslow | |
| 1999 | A Reasonable Man | Judge Wendon | |
| 1999 | Tarzan | Professor Porter | Voice |
| 1999 | The Clandestine Marriage | Lord Ogleby | Also associate producer |

=== Television ===
| Year | Title | Role | Notes |
|---|---|---|---|
| 1956 | Cry Wolf! | PC Bray | Television movie television debut |
| 1957 | The Goose Girl | Unknown | Television movie |
| 1957 | The Royal Astrologers | Third Thief | Television movie |
| 1957 | Bonehead | Bit Part | Episode: "Pilot" |
| 1957 | Huntingtower | Sinister Man | Episode: "#1.3" |
| 1957 | Villette | Second Footman | Television miniseries; 2 episodes |
| 1962 | The Last Man Out | Gestapo Man | Episode: "The Way Out" |
| 1963 | The Desperate People | Cliff Fletcher | recurring role; 4 episodes |
| 1963 | Man of the World | Assistant Director | Episode: "The Bandit" |
| 1963 | Bud | Trefor Jones | Episode: "#1.5" |
| 1964 | Detective | Temple Doorkeeper | Episode: "Death in Ecstasy" |
| 1964 | Emergency-Ward 10 | Colin Davies | Episode: "#1.769" |
| 1965 | Jury Room | David Hemming, Juror | Episode: "The Dilke Affair" |
| 1969 | Mrs Wilson's Diary | Roy Jenkins | Television movie |
| 1969 | The Gnomes of Dulwich | Gnome | Episode: "#1.6" |
| 1969 | Dad's Army | The Angry Man | Episode: "The Armoured Might of Lance Corporal Jones" |
| 1971 | The Last of the Baskets | Mr Snodgrass | Episode: "For Richer, for Poorer" |
| 1971 | Hine | Freddy Ambercourt | Episode: "Everything I Am I Owe" |
| 1973 | Hadleigh | Oliver Mason | 2 episodes |
| 1974 | Occupations | Libertini | Television movie |
| 1974 | Miss Nightingale | Dr Lewis | Television movie |
| 1976 | Couples | Mr Laker | recurring role; 3 episodes |
| 1976 | Bill Brand | Browning | Television Miniseries; Episode: "Yarn" |
| 1977 | Crown Court | Dr William Ranford | Episode: "Beauty and the Beast (Part 1)" |
| 1977 | Eleanor Marx | Engels | 2 episodes |
| 1977 | Marie Curie | Pierre Curie | Television miniseries; 4 episodes |
| 1977 | Just William | Mr Croombe | Episode: "The Great Detective" |
| 1978 | Warrior Queen | Catus Decianus | recurring role; 4 episodes |
| 1978 | Breakaway Girls | Derek Carter | Episode: "Sarah Carter" |
| 1978 | Going Straight | "Worm" Wellings | Episode: "Going Going Gone" |
| 1978 | Holocaust | Ohldendorf | Television miniseries; Episode: "Part 2" |
| 1978 | Edward & Mrs. Simpson | Walter Monckton | recurring role; 5 episodes |
| 1979 | Thomas and Sarah | Wilson | Episode: "The New Rich" |
| 1979 | The Other Side | Skellow | Episode: "Underdog" |
| 1979 | The Knowledge | Mr Burgess | Television movie |
| 1980 | The Misanthrope | Philinte | Television movie |
| 1980 | The Tempest | Stephano | Television movie |
| 1980 | Jukes of Piccadilly | Brinsley Jukes | recurring role; 6 episodes |
| 1980 | The Good Companions | Reverend Chillingford | Television miniseries; Episode: "Miss Trant Pays the Bill" |
| 1980 | A Tale of Two Cities | Mr C.J. Stryver | Television Movie |
| 1980–1984 | Yes Minister | Sir Humphrey Appleby | series regular; 22 episodes |
| 1981 | Tales of the Unexpected | Charles Drummond | Episode: "The Last Bottle in the World" |
| 1982 | The Hunchback of Notre Dame | Magistrate at Esmeralda's Trial | Television movie |
| 1982 | A Woman Called Golda | King Abdullah | Television movie |
| 1982 | The World Cup: A Captain's Tale | John Westwood | Television movie |
| 1982 | The Barchester Chronicles | Archdeacon Theophilus Grantly | Television miniseries; 7 episodes |
| 1983 | Tartuffe, or the Imposter | Orgon | |
| 1984 | Pope John Paul II | Cardinal Stefan Wyszynski | |
| 1984 | The House | General Fagg | |
| 1985–1986 | Mapp & Lucia | Georgie Pillson | recurring role; 10 episodes |
| 1985 | Jenny's War | Colonel | recurring role; 4 episodes |
| 1986–1988 | Yes, Prime Minister | Sir Humphrey Appleby | series regular; 16 episodes |
| 1989 | The Play on One | John | Episode: "The Shawl" |
| 1990 | Relatively Speaking | Philip Carter | Television movie |
| 1994 | Late Flowering Lust | Cousin John - poetry reader | A "blend of music, poetry, dance, actor/dancers..." |
| 1994 | Betjeman Revisited | Narrator | Hawthorne reads Betjeman's script for three 1962 programmes on Chippenham & Crewkerne, Sherborne, and Sidmouth, where the soundtrack was missing |
| 1995 | Russia's War: Blood upon the Snow | Narrator | Documentary series, 10 episodes |
| 1996 | Inside | Colonel | Television movie |
| 1996 | The Fragile Heart | Dr Edgar Pascoe | unknown episode |
| 1996 | The Happy Prince | Narrator | Television movie |
| 1997 | Forbidden Territory: Stanley's Search for Livingstone | David Livingstone | |
| 1998 | Animal Stories | Narrator | unknown episode |
| 2000 | The Last Polar Bears | Narrator | Television short |
| 2001 | Victoria & Albert | Lord William Lamb | Television movie |
| 2001 | Call Me Claus | Nick | Television movie, (final film role) |

=== Theatre ===
| Year | Title | Role | Company | Venue |
|---|---|---|---|---|
| 1950 | The Shop at Sly Corner | Archie | | Hofmeyr Theatre |
| 1951 | You Can't Take It With You | Donald | | Embassy Theatre |
| 1957 | His Excellency | Captain the Contino Sevastein Jacono de Piero | | |
| 1957 | Talking To You | Fancy Dan | | Duke of York's Theatre |
| 1967 | Mrs Wilson's Diary | Roy | | Criterion Theatre |
| 1967 | The Marie Lloyd Story | Sir Oswald Stoll | | Theatre Royal, Stratford |
| 1968 | Early Morning | Albert | | Royal Court Theatre |
| 1970 | Curtains | Niall | | Edinburgh Festival |
| 1971 | Curtains | Niall | | Open Space |
| 1971 | Alma Mater | Major | | |
| 1972 | The Trial of St George | Judge | | Soho Poly |
| 1973 | A Question of Everything | Hugh | | |
| 1973 | The Emergency Channel | Graham | | |
| 1973 | The Philanthropist | Philip | | May Fair |
| 1975 | A Child of Hope | Police Captain | | |
| 1975 | The Floater | Morris Shelman | | |
| 1975 | Otherwise Engaged | Stephen | | Queens Theatre |
| 1975 | The Doctor's Dilemma | Culter Walpole | | Mermaid Theatre |
| 1976 | Play Things | Tenby | | |
| 1976 | Buffet | Jack | | |
| 1976 | As You Like It | Touchstone | | Riverside Studios |
| 1977 | The Fire that Consumes | Abbe de Pradts | | Mermaid Theatre |
| 1977 | Blind date | Brian | | King's Head Theatre |
| 1977 | Privates on Parade | Major Gliles Flack | | |
| 1978 | Destiny | Major Lewis Rolfe | | |
| 1978 | The Millionairess | Julius | | Theatre Royal Haymarket |
| 1980 | The Enigma | Fenton | | |
| 1980 | A Rod of Iron | Trevor | | |
| 1980 | Jessie | Mr. Edmonds | | |
| 1981 | A Brush with Mr. Porter on the Road to Eldorado | Fulton | | |
| 1981 | Protest | Vaclav Havel | | |
| 1982 | The Critic | Mr. Sneer | | |
| 1986 | Across from the Garden of Allah | Douglas | | Comedy Theatre |
| 1988 | The Miser | Harpagon | | |
| 1988 | Hapgood | Blair | | Aldwych Theatre |
| 1989 | The Spirit of Man | Reverend Jonathan Guerdon | | |
| 1989 | Shadowlands | C. S. Lewis | | Queens Theatre |
| 1990 | Shadowlands | C. S. Lewis | | Brooks Atkinson Theatre |
| 1991 | The Trials of Oz | Brian Leary | | |
| 1991 | The Madness of George III | George III | | |
| 1992 | Flea Bites | Kryst | | |
| 1999 | King Lear | Lear | RSC | Barbican |

=== Video games ===
| Year | Title | Role | Notes |
|---|---|---|---|
| 1998 | Jeff Wayne's the War of the Worlds | The General | Voice |
| 2001 | Tarzan: Untamed | Professor Porter | Voice |

== Awards and honours ==
Hawthorne was appointed a Commander of the Order of the British Empire (CBE) in the 1987 New Years Honours List and was knighted in the 1999 New Years Honours List "for services to the Theatre, Film and Television."

=== Awards and nominations ===
| Year | Title | Accolade | Category | Result |
|---|---|---|---|---|
| 1977 | Privates on Parade | Laurence Olivier Award | Best Actor in a Supporting Role | Won |
| 1981 | Yes Minister | Broadcasting Press Guild Award | Best Actor in a Light Entertainment Program | Won |
| 1982 | Yes Minister | British Academy Television Award | Best Light Entertainment Performance | Won |
| 1983 | Yes Minister | British Academy Television Award | Best Light Entertainment Performance | Won |
| 1986 | The Magistrate | Laurence Olivier Awards | Best Comedy Performance | Nominated |
| 1987 | Yes, Prime Minister | British Academy Television Awards | Best Light Entertainment Performance | Won |
| 1988 | Yes, Prime Minister | British Academy Television Awards | Best Light Entertainment Performance | Won |
| 1989 | Yes, Prime Minister | CableACE Award | Actor in a Comedy Series | Nominated |
| 1990 | Shadowlands | Laurence Olivier Award | Actor of the Year | Nominated |
| 1991 | Shadowlands | Tony Award | Best Actor in a Play | Won |
| 1992 | The Madness of George III | Laurence Olivier Award | Actor of the Year | Won |
| 1995 | The Clandestine Marriage | Laurence Olivier Award | Best Comedy Performance | Nominated |
| 1995 | The Madness of King George | Academy Award | Best Actor | Nominated |
| 1996 | The Madness of King George | Empire Award | Best Actor | Won |
| 1996 | The Madness of King George | British Academy Film Award | Best Actor in a Leading Role | Won |
| 1996 | The Madness of King George | London Critics Circle Film Award | British Actor of the Year | Won |
| 1997 | The Fragile Heart | British Academy Television Award | Best Actor | Won |
| 1999 | The Object of My Affection | London Critics Circle Film Award | British Supporting Actor of the Year | Won |

== See also ==
- List of British actors
- List of Academy Award winners and nominees from Great Britain
- List of actors with Academy Award nominations
- List of LGBTQ Academy Award winners and nominees — Confirmed individuals for Best Lead Actor
