= Miguel Sandoval =

American actor (born 1951)

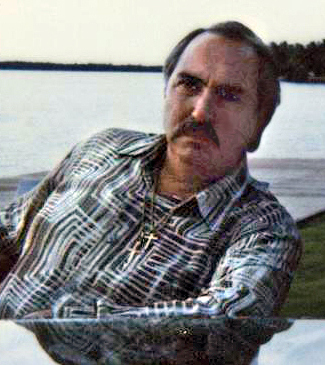
- Sandoval in 1999
- Born: November 16, 1951 (age 74); Washington, D.C., U.S.
- Occupations: Actor; director
- Years active: 1975–present
- Spouse: Linda Sandoval
- Children: Olivia Sandoval

Miguel Sandoval (born November 16, 1951) is an American actor. He is known for his role on the NBC/CBS drama series Medium (2005–2011), on which he played D.A. Manuel Devalos, and his collaborations with British director Alex Cox.

== Biography ==
Sandoval was born in Washington, D.C. He began working as a professional actor in 1975 when he joined a mime school in Albuquerque, New Mexico. He later joined the troupe full-time and continued his study of mime. He began his film career in the early 1980s. He had small roles in such acclaimed films as Do the Right Thing, Jungle Fever, and Jurassic Park. After appearing in Clear and Present Danger in 1994, he began to take on larger roles, and appeared in Get Shorty, Up Close & Personal, and Blow.

Having appeared briefly in Repo Man and Sid and Nancy, Sandoval has also played the major roles of Treviranus (in Death and the Compass), Bennie Reyes (in Three Businessmen) and Arizona Gray (in the "microfeature" Repo Chick) for director Alex Cox. In addition to film, Sandoval has acted in numerous television shows, often in recurring roles. Though shows such as The Court and Kingpin failed, he found success with Medium in 2005, on which he played D.A. Manuel Devalos until the series ended in 2011. Sandoval's other guest starring roles include appearances in popular series such as Frasier, ER, The X-Files, Seinfeld, Law & Order and Lois & Clark: The New Adventures of Superman. He was prominently featured in the first season of the ABC drama Murder One.

Sandoval has also directed, taking the helm for the third season Medium episode "Whatever Possessed You", which aired in March 2007. He directed one episode in each of seasons four through to seven.

Sandoval co-starred as Judge Hernandez in Bad Judge, an American legal comedy television series co-created by Chad Kultgen and Anne Heche. It premiered on NBC on October 2, 2014. After that, he had roles in Dirk Gently's Holistic Detective Agency, Sharp Objects, and Station 19.

== Personal life ==
Sandoval resides in Los Angeles, California. He and his wife Linda have a daughter, Olivia, an actress who portrayed his character's daughter on Medium.

== Filmography ==
=== Film ===
Year	Title	Role	Notes
1982	Timerider: The Adventure of Lyle Swann	Emil	Film role debut
1984	Repo Man	Archie	As Michael Sandoval
1986	Sid and Nancy	Record Company Executive	
1986	Howard the Duck	Bar Entertainment Supervisor	
1987	Walker	Parker French	
1987	Straight to Hell	George	
1989	Do the Right Thing	Officer Mark Ponte	
1991	Jungle Fever	Officer Mark Ponte	
1991	Ricochet	Vargas, Drug Dealer	
1992	White Sands	FBI Agent Ruiz	
1992	Death and the Compass	Treviranus	Originally aired as television film
1993	Jurassic Park	Juanito Rostagno	
1994	Death Wish V: The Face of Death	Lieutenant Hector Vasquez	
1994	Clear and Present Danger	Ernesto Escobedo	
1995	Get Shorty	Mr. Escobar	
1995	Fair Game	Emilio Juantorena	
1996	Up Close & Personal	Dan Duarte	
1996	Mrs. Winterbourne	Paco	
1998	Where's Marlowe?	Skip Pfeiffer	
1998	Three Businessmen	Bennie Reyes	
2000	Things You Can Tell Just by Looking at Her	Sam	
2000	Panic	Detective Larson	
2000	Flight of Fancy	Frank	
2000	The Crew	Raul Ventana, Drug Lord	
2000	Air Bud: World Pup	Coach Montoya	
2001	Blow	Augusto Oliveras	
2001	Human Nature	Wendall, The Therapist	
2001	Black Point	Malcolm	
2002	Collateral Damage	FBI Agent Joe Phipps	
2002	Ballistic: Ecks vs. Sever	FBI Agent Julio Martin	
2005	Nine Lives	Deputy Sheriff Ron	
2005	Marilyn Hotchkiss' Ballroom Dancing and Charm School	Matthew Smith	
2005	Crazylove	Bill Johansen	
2005	Tortilla Heaven	Gil Garcia	
2008	Bottle Shock	Mr. Garcia	
2008	Dispatches from Nicaragua	Himself	Documentary about the filming of Walker
2009	Repo Chick	Arizona Gray	
2009	Brüno	Himself	
2009	Tales of Masked Men	The Narrator	Voice
2011	Real Steel	Judge	Uncredited
2013	Oculus	Dr. Shawn Graham	
2014	The Book of Life	Land of the Remembered Captain	Voice
2016	Eternity Hill	Dr. Elias	
2016	Blood Father	Arturo Rios	
2022	The Grotto	Richie	

=== Television ===
Year	Title	Role	Notes
1982	Voyagers!	Ned Dawson	Episode: "Bully and Billy"; credited as Michael Sandoval
1984	Remington Steele	ER Doctor	Episode: "Steele Eligible"
1984	Fatal Vision	MP In Jeep	Miniseries
1985	Badge of the Assassin	Francisco Torres	Television film; credited as Michael Sandoval
1986	Hotel	Reporter #1	Episode: "Promises to Keep"
1988	St. Elsewhere	Mr. Heath	Episode: "Requiem for a Heavyweight"
1989	Hunter	Augustine Rojas	Episode: "Partners"
1989	From the Dead of Night	Duty Officer	Television film
1990	Doogie Howser, M.D.	Eye Doctor	Episode: "Vinnie's Blind Date"
1990	El Diablo	Roberto Zamudio	Television film
1990	Matlock	Carlos "Carl" Berman	Episode: "Nowhere to Run"
1990	Dangerous Passion	Sergeant Hidalgo	Television film
1990	D.E.A.	Rafael Cordera	6 episodes
1992	L.A. Law	Alvaro Campos	Episode: "I'm Ready for My Closeup, Mr. Markowitz"
1992	Civil Wars	Judge Felix Silva-Pures	Episode: "Below the Beltway"
1992	The Golden Palace	Ramone	Episode: "Seems Like Old Times: Part 2"
1992	Renegade	Hector Ortega	Episode: "Partners"
1993	Lois & Clark: The New Adventures of Superman	Eduardo Friez	2 episodes
1995	The Marshal	Lester Villa-Lobos	2 episodes
1996	Home Improvement	Mr. Jennings	Episode: "High School Confidential"
1996	The West	Himself	Voice, miniseries documentary; 2 episodes
1996	Murder One	Roberto Portalegre	3 episodes
1996	L.A. Firefighters	Arson Investigator Bernie Ramirez	13 episodes
1997	Players	General Simon Lott	2 episodes
1997–1998	Seinfeld	Marcelino	2 episodes
1998	Frasier	Mr. Martin	Episode: "Sweet Dreams"
1998	Sports Theater with Shaquille O'Neal	Gilberto	Episode: "Give and Go"
1999	Superman: The Animated Series	Doctor #2	Voice, Episode: "Unity"
1999–2000	Batman Beyond	Dr. Blades / Bennie / Mendez	Voice, 3 episodes
2000–2001	Level 9	Santoro Goff	Episode: "It's Magic/Reboot"
2000–2005	Jackie Chan Adventures	"El Toro" Fuerte	Voice, 12 episodes
2000–2002	Static Shock	Principal Aguilar	Voice, 2 episodes
2001	The Zeta Project	Dr. Nelson Arroyo	Voice, Episode: "His Maker's Name"
2001	Wild Iris	Ramando Galvez	Television film
2001	7th Heaven	Ramon Reyes	2 episodes
2001	Alias	Anthony Russek	3 episodes
2001	The X-Files	Martin Ortega	Episode: "Vienen"
2001	The West Wing	Victor Campos	Episode: "Ways and Means"
2002	Gotta Kick It Up!	Principal Zavala	Television film
2003	Kingpin	Tio Beto	2 episodes
2003	10-8: Officers on Duty	Captain Otis Briggs	13 episodes
2004	The Batman	Thug #1	Voice, Episode: "The Bat in the Belfry"
2005–2011	Medium	District Attorney Manuel Devalos / General	130 episodes
2007	El Tigre: The Adventures of Manny Rivera	Golden Leon	Voice, Episode: "The Grave Escape"
2008	Ben & Izzy	Ibn Firnas	Voice, English dub; episode: "A Flight of Fantasy, a Fantasy of Flight"
2009	Entourage	Carlos	5 episodes
2009	The Closer	Mario Gomez	Episode: "Blood Money"
2011	Metro	Felix Alvarez	Television film
2011	Bad Mom	Vagner	Television film
2011	Generator Rex	Oso Martelo / Guards	Voice, episode: "Outpost"
2012, 2019	Grey's Anatomy	Hank	Episode: "I Was Made for Lovin' You"
2012, 2019	Grey's Anatomy	Captain Pruitt Herrera	Episode: "Let's All Go to the Bar"
2013	Hawaii 5-0	Luis Braga	Episode: "Aloha. Malama Pono"
2013	The Surgeon General	Senator Nortega	Television film
2014–2015	Bad Judge	Judge Hernandez	13 episodes
2014	Dallas	"El Pozolero"	3 episodes
2016	Dirk Gently's Holistic Detective Agency	Colonel Scott Riggins	6 episodes
2017	Graves	"El Terrón"	Episode: "Spark Meet Gasoline"
2018–2021	Station 19	Captain Pruitt Herrera	43 episodes
2018	Sharp Objects	Frank Curry	Voice, 8 episodes
2020–2021	Solar Opposites	Enrique	Voice, 6 episodes
2022	Barry	Fernando	4 episodes
2023–present	The Diplomat	Secretary of State Miguel Ganon	11 episodes
2024	Sugar	Thomas Kinsey	4 episodes

=== Video game ===
Year	Title	Voice role	Ref(s)
2006	Scarface: The World Is Yours	Nacho Contreras	
