= Medium season 3 =

Medium
- Season 3
- DVD cover
- No. of episodes: 22

Release
- Original network: NBC
- Original release: November 15, 2006 – May 16, 2007

Season chronology
- ← Previous; Season 2 Next → Season 4

The third season of Medium, an American television series, began November 15, 2006, and ended on May 16, 2007. It aired on NBC.

== Production ==
Despite a decline in the ratings during Season 2, NBC renewed Medium for a third season, but was missing from the fall schedule. The series was slated to return in 2007, however, in October 2006 NBC announced that Medium would return on November 15, 2006 at 9pm with a 2-hour premiere before settling into its 10.00pm slot the following week. The series moved from its previous Monday 10.00pm timeslot to Wednesdays at 10.00pm. Its move to Wednesday, airing against CSI: NY and Lost, resulted in further erosion in the ratings, falling into single digit millions of viewers. The ratings decline resulted in the show being on the bubble for renewal but during the season NBC ordered a full 22 episode season. The show was renewed for a fourth season in May 2007.

== Cast and characters ==
=== Main cast ===
- Patricia Arquette as Allison DuBois
- Miguel Sandoval as Manuel Devalos
- David Cubitt as Lee Scanlon
- Sofia Vassilieva as Ariel DuBois
- Maria Lark as Bridgette DuBois
- Jake Weber as Joe DuBois

=== Recurring cast ===
- Madison and Miranda Carabello as Marie DuBois
- Neve Campbell as Debra
- Tina DiJoseph as Lynn DiNovi
- Ryan Hurst as Michael AKA Lucky Allison's Half Brother

== Episodes ==
No. overall	No. in season	Title	Directed by	Written by	Original release date	U.S. viewers (millions)
39	1	"Four Dreams (Part I)"	Aaron Lipstadt	Glenn Gordon Caron & Javier Grillo-Marxuach	November 15, 2006	9.44
Allison and Bridgette are having dreams (though Bridgette's are animated) about several violent crimes that are taking place.
40	2	"Four Dreams (Part II)"	Aaron Lipstadt	Glenn Gordon Caron & Javier Grillo-Marxuach	November 15, 2006	9.44
Allison and Bridgette are having dreams (though Bridgette's are animated) about several violent crimes that are taking place.
41	3	"Be Kind, Rewind"	Aaron Lipstadt	Ken Schefler	November 22, 2006	7.45
Allison keeps re-living the same awful day in her dreams, with each attempt to fix it leading to more bad consequences.
42	4	"Blood Relations"	Oz Scott	Robert Doherty	November 29, 2006	8.01
When nemesis Dr. Charles Walker (Mark Sheppard) begins to reappear in Allison's dreams, she fears his spirit may be returning to continue his evildoing by inhabiting the living. Her fears escalate when she meets a young man who has an uncanny resemblance to the serial killer from the late 1800s.
43	5	"Ghost in the Machine"	Andy Wolk	Moira Kirland	December 6, 2006	8.58
When Allison buys a camcorder for Joe's birthday, she begins to see images through it that seem to be linked to a murder that may or may not have happened. Special Guest Star: Kathleen Robertson.
44	6	"Profiles in Terror"	Peter Werner	Craig Sweeny	December 13, 2006	9.96
While working on a case involving a possible serial killer, Allison locks horns with a celebrated FBI criminal profiler, Agent Edward Cooper, when her visions differ from his findings. Meanwhile, Joe worries when Marie begins exhibiting bizarre behaviour.
45	7	"Mother's Little Helper"	Vincent Misiano	Moira Kirland	January 3, 2007	9.33
After Allison and Ariel stumble upon the bodies of a dress shop owner and her daughter (Jennifer Lawrence), they both begin dreaming about the crime, but from different perspectives, revealing more than one possible suspect.
46	8	"The Whole Truth"	Leslie Libman	Diane Ademu-John	January 17, 2007	8.95
While assisting District Attorney Devalos' investigation of the mysterious death of a well-respected congressman, Allison experiences puzzling visions of a little boy trapped in a well.
47	9	"Better Off Dead"	Janice Cooke-Leonard	Robert Doherty	January 24, 2007	8.72
Allison's latest visions reveal an odd friendship between two unrelated ghosts. She is surprised when one of them rebuffs her attempts to determine the identity of his killer.
48	10	"Very Merry Maggie"	Arliss Howard	Craig Sweeny	January 31, 2007	9.90
If dreams of child abuse weren’t disturbing enough, Allison becomes spooked by a young boy’s doll, who seems to have urged its owner to kill. Meanwhile, with a project deadline looming, Joe becomes concerned about his health.
49	11	"Apocalypse, Push"	Aaron Lipstadt	Javier Grillo-Marxuach	February 7, 2007	8.15
Skeptical Texas Ranger Kenneth Push comes back into Allison’s life after he begins to experience dreams of a shocking murder in Phoenix. Also, Joe suffers an embarrassing moment after telling a white lie.
50	12	"The One Behind the Wheel"	Leon Ichaso	Diane Ademu-John	February 14, 2007	8.62
Allison wakes up believing she is a completely different person. Joe has to deal with the spirit who has possessed her and help her find out what happened to her.
51	13	"Second Opinion"	David Lerner	Sterling Anderson	February 21, 2007	7.84
Allison dreams that her youngest daughter Marie is going to die of cancer in 20 years. Thinking something in their house must be carcinogenic, she tries to persuade Joe that they should move to a housing development, but the meaning of her dreams take a turn. Meanwhile, Officer Scanlon pressures a lab technician to come clean after covering up a deadly secret. It turns out that Allison's dreams and Scanlon's investigation both concern the housing development Allison and Joe were looking at: there are unsafe chemicals in the water supply and Albert Bunford (Alan Ruck) attempted to cover up.
52	14	"We Had a Dream"	Arlene Sanford	Javier Grillo-Marxuach	February 28, 2007	7.63
Allison dreams that a psychic killer whom she helped put away will escape from prison. Now he's going after Allison in her own home.
53	15	"The Boy Next Door"	Aaron Lipstadt	Moira Kirland	March 7, 2007	8.66
Teenage Allison has a dream about present-day Allison and Joe telling their children the story of how they first met, and adult Allison reveals they almost crossed paths years earlier at a science fair. Later in the dream, present-day Allison runs into a high school acquaintance and neighbor, Stephen Campbell, at the supermarket, and she reveals she is no longer in touch with Izzy, her best friend from high school. When Izzy invites teenage Allison to the same science fair present-day Allison mentioned in the dream, she tells Izzy about it. Izzy dismisses the dream because they don't know anyone named Stephen Campbell, but when they walk home from school, they meet teenage Allison's new neighbor: young Stephen. Teenage Allison likes young Stephen at first, but she starts to feel uneasy when she dreams that in present-day Allison's world, Stephen is a suspect in the murder of a 13-year-old girl and a convicted sex offender. Teenage Allison rejects young Stephen when he asks her out, and the night before the science fair, she finds her cat murdered in the backyard. At the science fair, teenage Allison and Izzy find Joe's booth but are interrupted when young Stephen shows up unannounced, and teenage Allison realizes he killed her cat and leaves the fair. Izzy hangs out with young Stephen afterwards, but she comes to teenage Allison's house in tears because she is convinced Stephen was about to rape her when his father came home. Teenage Allison encourages Izzy to report the incident, but she refuses; this is the beginning of the end of their friendship. Teenage Allison then dreams about present-day Allison interrogating adult Stephen. During the interrogation, Stephen admits that Allison saved his life as a teenager when she knocked on his door to deliver cookies meant for his father, not knowing Stephen was about to commit suicide. Teenage Allison is forced by her mother to deliver the cookies at Stephen's house but decides to not knock on the door; she quickly hears a gunshot and is later informed that Stephen died. In the present day, Allison drops Ariel off at school and realizes Ariel's new friend is the girl who Stephen Campbell would've murdered had he lived.
54	16	"Whatever Possessed You"	Miguel Sandoval	Robert Doherty	March 28, 2007	7.66
Allison has disturbing dreams about a young woman who seems possessed, which could help in another investigation.
55	17	"Joe Day Afternoon"	Aaron Lipstadt	Ken Schefler	April 4, 2007	8.42
Bruce Rossiter (Adam Goldberg), a recently-fired and disgruntled co-worker with apparently nothing to lose (being terminally ill with brain cancer), traps Joe, his boss (Larry Miller), and two of his coworkers in a hostage situation at work. As tensions escalate in Joe's office, Allison and Ariel both have visions of the tragedy.
56	18	"1-900-LUCKY"	David Arquette	Javier Grillo-Marxuach & Robert Doherty	April 11, 2007	7.71
Allison investigates the case of a woman's murdered husband, while her brother Michael gets a job as a telephone hotline psychic which leads him to visit a distressed customer in Arizona – the same customer whose case Allison is investigating. Meanwhile, Bridgette has difficulty explaining to Joe that it was her math teacher who smashed his car window.
57	19	"No One to Watch Over Me"	Vincent Misiano	Travis Donnelly & Corey Reed	April 25, 2007	7.16
Allison keeps awaking from confusing dreams where she is out in the snow, which leads to the discovery of a young woman named Haley's body. The case gets more complicated when Allison meets the victim's younger sister, Jennie (Elisabeth Moss plays both Haley and adult Jennie). Meanwhile, Joe, who’s still coping with the repercussions of the shooting at work, returns to the office for the first time since the tragedy.
58	20	"Head Games"	Joanna Kerns	Javier Grillo-Marxuach & Robert Doherty & Moira Kirland	May 2, 2007	7.70
Allison is confused when her dreams of a man named Walter Paxton (Jason Priestley) murdering his wife keep occurring, even after she helped Devalos convince the jury of the suspected killer's guilt. Through her troubles she manages to make a new friend named Debra (Neve Campbell). Meanwhile, Joe is frustrated by the therapy sessions that his job enrolled him in, and can't express his feelings to Allison because the recent hostage situation he was in is still greatly affecting him.
59	21	"Heads Will Roll"	Aaron Lipstadt	Diane Ademu-John	May 9, 2007	7.91
The investigation of the murder of Walter Paxton's wife seems to indicate that a serial killer is on the loose. While helping with the case, Allison discovers that her new friend Debra may be the next victim and tries to protect her, only to find out that her new friend isn't who she thought she was. Meanwhile, Joe debates being part of a lawsuit against his longtime employer, Aerodytech.
60	22	"Everything Comes to a Head"	Ronald L. Schwary	Ken Schefler	May 16, 2007	7.75
Allison's life is turned upside down when her powers are revealed and she must find a way to bring the killer to justice on her own.
