= Medium season 1 =

Medium
- Season 1
- DVD cover
- No. of episodes: 16

Release
- Original network: NBC
- Original release: January 3 – May 23, 2005

Season chronology
- Next → Season 2

The first season of Medium, an American television drama series, originally aired in the United States on NBC between January 3, 2005, and May 23, 2005. The show was created by Glenn Gordon Caron and based on the experiences of real-life medium Allison DuBois, a suburban wife and mother who uses her ability to communicate with the dead to assist law enforcement officials in criminal investigations. This is the first season to air on NBC.

The season introduced regular cast members Patricia Arquette, Maria Lark, Miguel Sandoval, Sofia Vassilieva, and Jake Weber. David Cubitt was a recurring star.

== Cast and characters ==
=== Main cast ===
- Patricia Arquette as Allison DuBois
- Miguel Sandoval as Manuel Devalos
- Sofia Vassilieva as Ariel DuBois
- Maria Lark as Bridgette DuBois
- Jake Weber as Joe DuBois

=== Recurring cast ===
- Madison and Miranda Carabello as Marie DuBois
- Tina DiJoseph as Lynn DuNovi
- David Cubitt as Lee Scanlon
- Arliss Howard as Captain Kenneth Push
- Ryan Hurst as Allison's Half Brother Lucky

== Episodes ==
| No. overall | No. in season | Title | Directed by | Written by | Original release date | Prod. code | U.S. viewers (millions) |
|---|---|---|---|---|---|---|---|
| 1 | 1 | "Pilot" | Glenn Gordon Caron | Glenn Gordon Caron | January 3, 2005 | 001 | 16.09 |
Wife, mother, and suburban housewife working part-time for the D.A.'s office, Manuel Devalos, Allison Dubois is a medium and self-professed psychic, who has the ability to foresee and witness past and current events in her dreams and mediate as a messenger between the living and the spirits of the dead. Her first case is put to the test when she tries to convince her rocket-scientist husband, Joe Dubois, about her dreams being extremely specific and realistic. One in particular about a middle-aged man suspected of murdering his wife; during this, she also has visions about a case on which she is currently working with the D.A., where a little girl goes missing from a parking lot. On the case of investigating the home invasion, she, with the aid of a coworker, visits a woman named Catherine (Margo Martindale), a psychic with the same level of ability as Allison, to find information on a little girl's whereabouts. Catherine tests Allison's acceptance of her special abilities, and she claims although she has been in connection with the dead since she was six years old, she is not denying who she is. However, Allison, doing everything she can to get past her husband's skepticism and other doubters in the justice system about her dreams and connections she has with the dead, is put to the ultimate test when she gets a call from the Texas Rangers to investigate a pedophiliac murder involving two minors and the suspect's dead sister who witnessed the event.
| 2 | 2 | "Suspicions and Certainties" | Vincent Misiano | Glenn Gordon Caron | January 10, 2005 | 002 | 16.34 |
Allison has sickening dreams revolving around a serial killer who practices necrophilia with his deceased victims. Meanwhile, Allison and Joe are invited to dine with friends, where Allison foresees events as they really occurred as the wife of the other couple tells a story, testing Joe's patience when she tries to get him to believe in her special gifts. Back on the serial killer case, as Allison is in the process of gaining everyone's trust, she aids Devalos in an attempt to place the predator behind bars. With Allison's help, Devalos is able to select a jury that decides to give the serial killer the death penalty. By the end of the episode, Allison makes a shocking discovery when the man they have been searching for all along, the same man who confesses to the murders, is not the man who has been appearing in her dreams. The man Allison was seeing in her dreams as the serial killer turns out to be just a man on the cover of a menu at the restaurant Allison, Joe, and their friends had gone to earlier that week.
| 3 | 3 | "A Couple of Choices" | Jeff Bleckner | Michael Angeli & Glenn Gordon Caron | January 17, 2005 | 009 | 14.44 |
Allison has an eerie dream in which a marriage counselor encourages a young couple to commit a murder-suicide. These dreams begin to make sense when Allison and the D.A. realize they are on a case involving a serial killer who targets young newlyweds; in each scenario, the husband is given the option to shoot his wife or else they will both be killed. With more and more support from her recently skeptical husband Joe and employer Devalos, Allison begins working with Detective Lee Scanlon, who is extremely outraged the Phoenix D.A.'s office is allowing somebody like Allison to collaborate her abilities on cases; not only does this drive Devalos and Allison's patience, but also Allison is shocked to find out one set of newlywed victims was Lee's sister and his brother-in-law. Meanwhile, Allison has dreams appearing to her in crime scene shots, which becomes strikingly relevant when Detective Lee Scanlon realizes the couples all used the same wedding photographer. In end, the wedding photographer turned out to be the serial killer. The episode concludes with Detective Lee Scanlon gaining more respect for what Allison does.
| 4 | 4 | "Night of the Wolf" | Artie Mandelberg | René Echevarria | January 24, 2005 | 003 | 15.78 |
Allison’s dream could only be more confusing, mimicking the storyline of "Little Red Riding Hood"; a snarling wolf chases her through a Phoenix airport, where she has no choice but to jump from a rooftop. She wakes up believing her dream was just an ordinary dream until she begins to see these messages coming to her in her sleep, having a connection with a young fiancée's witnessed to a murder (that of her engaged boyfriend), and she proceeds to give an inaccurate description to a police sketch artist, worrying her boyfriend's killer will come after her. Meanwhile, Bridgette Dubois, Allison and Joe's middle daughter, has been afraid of returning to school; finding out their daughter is a bit of a social outcast upsets both of them. However, things turn out okay when she makes a new friend, Bobby, a young boy the same age as Bridgette, only to realize he is a lost soul who was once a victim in a horrific schoolyard tragedy. Joe is more upset by the fact his daughter has inherited Allison's gift of seeing dead people, which in turn hurts Allison. Allison explains to Bridgette and her new friend Bobby that Bobby needs to let go and will always be able to watch out for Bridgette. Towards the end, Allison discovers their witness actually had a history with her late boyfriend's murderer, Detective Wolf, a dirty cop who is willingly to bend the rules and work on the wrong side of the law. Allison thinks she has their killer once the crime matches up with the pieces of evidence she has been receiving in her dreams.
| 5 | 5 | "In Sickness and Adultery" | Aaron Lipstadt | Michael Angeli | January 31, 2005 | 006 | 15.85 |
Allison has an extremely explicit dream where she makes love with husband Joe, only to find herself winding up in a dead police officer's open casket, with Joe mysteriously out of sight. The dead officer has been told to give her a message about Joe: "Australia." Allison wakes up to find the message's truth: Joe is sent for a biopsy for a mole on his back that used to be round, but is now black and shaped like the continent of Australia. She returns to Catherine, a psychic just like Allison, to heed her advice on her husband's health. To Allison's surprise, his health is just fine; their marriage is what they need to look out for, and this scares Allison to point where she believes Joe's late-evening work extensions are actually just to buy time so he can rendezvous with a secret admirer. She also battles with her conscience when Devalos asks her a favor to testify in the murder of the police officer she has been seeing in her dreams, but to remain discreet about her special abilities she has been tying into her profession. She has the same debate with Joe, who insists Allison should agree with Devalos, believing exposing her gift will complicate their work and family life. She comes face-to-face with rival opponent Larry Watt, an attorney who comes close to destroying Allison in court. In the end, everything behind Joe's secret admirer and their marriage being in trouble is revealed to be a misinterpretation by both Allison and Catherine. Note: For this episode, Patricia Arquette won the Primetime Emmy Award for Outstanding Lead Actress in a Drama Series.
| 6 | 6 | "Coming Soon" | Vincent Misiano | Moira Kirland | February 7, 2005 | 004 | 13.97 |
Allison starts having very spooky dreams in which a man breaks into the Dubois family home and tries to kidnap her daughters, insisting he is a very bad man, "a golem, a devil, and a monster" simultaneously. However, she wakes up believing her dream was not based on any specified event because of a talking doll that intercepted the dream. To Allison's horror, though, she discovers the bad man from her sleep is actually a real man, but she is very disappointed to find out that not only are her dreams wrong, but also he is a Good Samaritan and currently working with her boss, Devalos, to solve a witnessed robbery. After a short encounter, she learns all she needs to know; he is a serial murder and rapist who victimizes good girls and then disposes of their bodies in the desert, so she urges Devalos to run a check. Unfortunately, he is still a clean man, but despite the evidence proving so, she is still not convinced. Still haunting her dreams, Allison's preoccupation with this man interrupts her daily pregnancy tests so greatly that she even follows him to work and inadvertently accuses him of a murder he did not commit. Meanwhile, Joe starts tutoring Ariel Dubois in math, believing he takes after her, but to Joe's dismay, their eldest daughter has also seemed to have inherited Allison's gift when she picks up the license plate of the same man who is disrupting Alison's sleep. In the end, Allison confronts him before he leaves, although he is not a murderer now, a license plate evidently will be present in the next seven to ten years where in Allison's visions he is proven to be a killer.
| 7 | 7 | "Jump Start" | Artie Mandelberg | Melinda Hsu | February 14, 2005 | 008 | 14.52 |
Allison dreams a young woman commits suicide by jumping off a cliff. The adversarial attorney from a previous episode and his son are both involved with this young woman.
| 8 | 8 | "Lucky" | Peter Werner | David Folwell | February 21, 2005 | 007 | 13.77 |
Allison dreams her half-brother Michael is dead, but the next day, he appears at her door with an army colleague. Michael is known in his regiment as "Lucky" because he guesses when to dodge lethal explosions. Allison has trouble communicating with a ghost of a girl who died in a house fire. Michael helps her out, but is in denial about the gift he has apparently inherited. Meanwhile, he is being blackmailed by an army colleague involved in something illegitimate.
| 9 | 9 | "Coded" | Bill L. Norton | Moira Kirland | February 28, 2005 | 010 | 15.28 |
Ariel has a dream about an ogre and a girl locked inside a castle that she thinks is real. Allison initially dismisses it as just a dream until she realizes that it is true, when Ariel tracks down a boy whose sister, Sara Crewson (Jennette McCurdy), is presumed dead after being kidnapped two years earlier. Allison brings the case to Devalos and Scanlon, who tell her that a man named Darrell is already in jail for killing Sara because surveillance cameras captured the kidnapping on tape. Allison initially claims the dreams are her own because they do not know Ariel has her talents, but since Ariel's dreams are coded, she gets involved in the investigation. They eventually realize that the ogre is actually Henry, Darrell's mentally disabled brother, and the castle is a toy castle located inside the remote house where Henry is holding Sara hostage. Henry is off the grid, but Allison and Scanlon are able to narrow down his location because Darrell uses his phone privileges every week to call a convenience store where Henry receives the call. Meanwhile, Darrell calls Henry and tells him to kill Sara because the police are on their tail. Ariel has another dream about Sara shooting the ogre and calls Allison just as Scanlon and she arrive at the house. Henry comes outside after forcing Sara to hide in the closet, but Sara finds Henry's gun inside the toy castle and shoots him from the window while Ariel is warning Allison about the dream.
| 10 | 10 | "The Other Side of the Tracks" | Eric Laneuville | Chris Dingess | March 14, 2005 | 005 | 15.35 |
Allison has a recurring dream about two boys trying to cross train tracks before a train arrives, and the older boy is the only one to make it across, since the younger one trips and falls just short of the tracks. When the train passes by, the younger boy has vanished. Since the dream has been interfering with Allison's sleep, she visits Dr. Leonard Cardwell, who researches mediums and psychics. Dr. Cardwell tells her that the train track dream really happened; he is the older boy and his younger brother, Kenny, went missing that day at the train tracks and is presumed dead, since the dead bodies of three other boys who went missing that same summer were found. Since no grave exists for Allison to visit, she tries to pick something up from Kenny's belongings, but has no luck. Allison realizes the dream will not stop until she solves the case, but she hits a seemingly major snag when she goes to the movies with Joe, and her dream is actually a coming attraction for a movie. While at the bookstore for a children's event with her daughter, though, Allison finds that the movie is based on a book written by Ken Buckley. Allison realizes that Kenny Cardwell and Ken Buckley are the same person and goes to his house, where she finds the ghost of the woman who raised him. She tells Allison that she kidnapped Kenny Cardwell by the tracks because she lost her own son to scarlet fever; she raised him as her own child. When Ken Buckley returns to his house, Allison tells him about his real identity. Later, Dr. Cardwell and Kenny reunite.
| 11 | 11 | "I Married a Mind Reader" | Duane Clark | René Echevarria | March 21, 2005 | 011 | 11.68 |
Sick with a cold, Allison's medium abilities go a little whacky and she receives a dream that leads her to investigate an old 1960s murder. The husband from a husband/wife team of an Ozzie and Harriet-style show was imprisoned for murdering his wife, but the story has more than meets the eye.
| 12 | 12 | "A Priest, a Doctor, and a Medium Walk into an Execution Chamber" | Bill L. Norton | Chris Dingess | March 28, 2005 | 012 | 13.71 |
Allison, Devalos, and Scanlon investigate a murder perpetrated by the "ghost" of a man whose execution they witnessed. Meanwhile, Allison discovers information about a troubled mom's past.
| 13 | 13 | "Being Mrs. O'Leary's Cow" | Ronald L. Schwary | Melinda Hsu | April 25, 2005 | 013 | 14.43 |
Allison wrestles with turning in a man who killed his wife when her visions reveal that he will prevent a plane from crashing in the future.
| 14 | 14 | "In the Rough" | Duane Clark | René Echevarria | May 2, 2005 | 015 | 12.74 |
When a case from ten years ago is reopened, Allison finds out that the accused was framed for the crime by someone she trusts, but sees that he is guilty of another instead.
| 15 | 15 | "Penny for Your Thoughts" | Aaron Lipstadt | Moira Kirland | May 9, 2005 | 014 | 12.79 |
Allison encounters a psychopathic doctor, who raped and murdered numerous teenaged girls years ago. After learning that an evil soul (Mark Sheppard) has been possessing people, she sets forth to stop it before a new victim is found. Meanwhile, Ariel's math teacher accuses her of cheating and Joe steps up to her defense.
| 16 | 16 | "When Push Comes to Shove (Part I)" | Aaron Lipstadt | Chris Dingess | May 23, 2005 | 016 | 11.79 |
Joe and the kids are getting tired of Allison never being home, but Devalos needs her help tracking down a serial killer. After seeing Capt. Kenneth Push in a vision at the murder scene, Allison calls upon his assistance to find the serial killer. Push says the cases in Phoenix resemble an earlier serial killer spree in Texas, where the words "Isaiah 14:21" were present at every crime scene, the killer cut out the victims' hearts, and the killings stopped abruptly. The first two are quickly established as matching to the Phoenix cases. Based on the biblical verse, Allison figures out that the victims are somehow related to each other, and DNA tests show the victims have the same father. Allison and Joe's relationship continues to deteriorate the longer the case drags on. Captain Push's heart condition flares up and when he dies for a minute or two, he shows up in Allison's dreams to tell her the next victim's name, only to disappear when he is resuscitated. Captain Push is about to have surgery to get a pacemaker, but when he finds out the next victim has already been killed, he puts his life on the line to help Allison solve the case.

== Reception ==
=== Awards ===
Patricia Arquette won the 2005 Primetime Emmy Award for Outstanding Lead Actress in a Drama Series.
