= Medium season 2 =

Medium
- Season 2
- DVD cover
- No. of episodes: 22

Release
- Original network: NBC
- Original release: September 19, 2005 – May 22, 2006

Season chronology
- ← Previous; Season 1 Next → Season 3

The second season of Medium, an American television series, began September 19, 2005, and ended on May 22, 2006. It aired on NBC. Starting this season, David Cubitt joined the main cast.

== Cast and characters ==
=== Main cast ===
- Patricia Arquette as Allison DuBois
- Miguel Sandoval as Manuel Devalos
- David Cubitt as Lee Scanlon
- Sofia Vassilieva as Ariel DuBois
- Maria Lark as Bridgette DuBois
- Jake Weber as Joe DuBois

=== Recurring cast ===
- Madison and Miranda Carabello as Marie DuBois
- Bruce Gray as Joe's Dad
- Tina DiJoseph as Lynn DiNovi
- Conor O'Farrell as Larry Watt
- Ryan Hurst as Michael "Lucky" Benoit (Allison's Half Brother)

== Episodes ==
| No. overall | No. in season | Title | Directed by | Written by | Original release date | U.S. viewers (millions) |
|---|---|---|---|---|---|---|
| 17 | 1 | "When Push Comes to Shove (Part II)" | Aaron Lipstadt | Glenn Gordon Caron | September 19, 2005 | 12.69 |
The second season picks up 3 months after the season 1 finale. Captain Kenneth Push is still in a coma, Allison hasn't had any dreams in the past 3 months, and she and Joe have been working on their marriage with success. As part of fixing their marriage, Allison vowed to try and cut back at work, while Joe promised to attend therapy. When Joe goes to his first therapy appointment, his therapist says Allison is very inconsiderate of his feelings by running to her job at all hours. While visiting Captain Push at the hospital, Allison sees the ghost of Push's father, who tells Allison she has to finish the dream Push risked his life to give her or she will not only never find the serial killer, but she will also never have her dreams again. Joe wants her to sacrifice her dreams, but Allison refuses because Devalos figures out the father of the victims was a sperm donor, and the serial killer has killed all of the sperm donor's children (the victims of both the Texas and Phoenix sprees) except for one: eighteen-year-old Phoenix resident Bella, who is in protective custody. Allison finishes Captain Push's dream, which reveals that the sperm donor left his fiancé, who was pregnant with their son at the time. As soon as Allison finishes the dream, Captain Push awakes from his coma. Allison realize the sperm donor's son, named Isaiah after the biblical verse, was raised by his mother off the grid so that he would be nearly impossible to find, and that she raised him to carry out vengeance against his father's other children. Bella agrees to return to work as a concession stand worker at the basketball arena so that Allison, Push, Devalos, and Scanlon can attempt to lure Isaiah out of hiding. After the game is over, it appears their plan has failed until an officer shows up to take Bella back to protective custody. Captain Push realizes the officer is wearing hightop sneakers and repeatedly calls for him to stop. The officer, really Isaiah, pulls out a gun and he and Push exchange fire; Push kills Isaiah.
| 18 | 2 | "The Song Remains the Same" | Vincent Misiano | Bruce Miller | September 26, 2005 | 13.24 |
A deafening continuous stream of "I Will Survive" in Allison's head leads her to seek the help of Dr. Cardwell at the university. While Cardwell is not on campus due to a conference, changes to the song in Allison's head (it repeats certain verses) leads her to the lost MP3 player of a missing college girl, Isabel Navarro. Allison meets Isabel's father and Catholic priest, but when she shakes the priest's hand, the song starts up again and repeats one line, leading her to suspect the priest is either involved in or knows something about Isabel's disappearance. Allison confronts the priest and realizes it is the latter, but he is reluctant to give her the information since it came from Confession, and he doesn't want to break his vow (keeping all confessions confidential). Meanwhile, the DuBois family prepares to travel to Salt Lake City for Joe's sister's wedding, but when Joe suggests they fly instead of drive, both Allison and Bridgette have visions of a plane crash in which Joe dies; though initially skeptical, Joe agrees to drive. Allison and Bridgette's dream ends up not prophesizing the crash of the plane to Salt Lake City, but instead the place where Isabel is being kept. Allison finds Isabel alive under a false floorboard in a remote barn.
| 19 | 3 | "Time Out of Mind" | Arliss Howard | Robert Doherty | October 3, 2005 | 12.89 |
Allison gets stuck in a dream loop, where she is a mental patient undergoing barbaric experimental treatment. When she investigates she finds that, in 1959, there was a patient called Beverley who claimed she was really Allison DuBois living in 2005. Allison has to work out why she is dreaming about Beverley and what it has to do with the current case she and Devalos are working on: Timothy Kircher (Rami Malek), a murderer who shows signs of schizophrenia.
| 20 | 4 | "Light Sleeper" | Elodie Keene | Peter Egan | October 10, 2005 | 12.68 |
Allison is sleepwalking, and not the normal kind: Joe has to save Allison when she ends up standing on a crowded highway in the middle of the night, and then her dreams force her to go and withdraw her money. Allison's sleepwalking is not only frightening her family, but it is also getting in the way of an investigation into the disappearance of a billionaire businessman and his young son, Justin. Justin's mother alleges that her billionaire ex-husband kidnapped their son and took him to an island so that she'd never see him again. She threatens to have the story published in the tabloids in 48 hours if Devalos doesn't ramp up the investigation. Allison's sleepwalking eventually leads to her and Joe finding a car wreck containing the dead body of the billionaire; Joe also finds wads of cash in a duffel bag nearby, but Justin is nowhere to be found. Allison later realizes that Justin's uncle (James Frain) kidnapped him, and Justin is found alive. Meanwhile, Ariel seeks more independence and asks her parents to let her walk home with her best friend after school; Joe sees no choice but to allow Ariel this freedom, while Allison is opposed.
| 21 | 5 | "Sweet Dreams" | Aaron Lipstadt | Moira Kirland | October 17, 2005 | 11.94 |
Allison has flashbacks to her high school years, when the ghost of an old man warned her not to let her best friend, Lyla, leave to follow her dreams of being a model. Allison must connect the flashbacks and a dream about an earthquake to the kidnapping of Cynthia (Emma Stone), the 'difficult' daughter of the mayor, one of Devalos' friends. Scanlon looks into the fate of Lyla and tells Allison that she died in 1989. When the mayor takes a polygraph test to rule him out as a suspect, Allison realizes that he sexually assaulted Cynthia and there is a tape of him assaulting her, but the tape is missing. The police find a car drenched with 4 liters of Cynthia's blood, an amount of blood loss that Devalos says is unsurvivable. Allison later wakes up from her earthquake dream thinking an earthquake occurred in Phoenix, so she turns on the news and sees Lyla alive. Allison travels to the school where Lyla works and asks for an explanation. Lyla reveals that one day, she and her husband had a fight and he kicked her out of their car while in Oakland. The 1989 Loma Prieta earthquake occurred that night, and since Lyla's belongings were in the car, she was presumed dead. Lyla saw it as a chance to start over and found a man who could get her legitimate documents for $100,000. She also says that for another $100,000, the man could tell someone how to fake their own death by gradually harvesting 4 liters of their own blood. Allison realizes that Cynthia faked her own death and tracks her down. Knowing the hell her father put her through, Allison lets Cynthia start her new life and a grateful Cynthia gives Allison the missing tape of her father sexually assaulting her.
| 22 | 6 | "Dead Aim" | Richard Pearce | Melinda Hsu | October 24, 2005 | 12.76 |
A recurring dream of the DA's office staff being slaughtered makes Allison very jumpy at work, which doesn't help when Watt brings in a rival psychic to help defend his client. After Watt besmirches the character of two witnesses in a row in court, Devalos believes the rival psychic might be the real thing, so Allison attends one of the psychic's book readings and ascertains she is a fraud. Allison realizes her dream is actually a metaphor: a new employee at the DA's office is feeding information to Watt. Meanwhile, Joe takes Bridgette to work with him, and it takes a turn when Bridgette correctly predicts that a potential deal Joe's company is making will involve selling a project involving making missiles more accurate in their targeting to the military. Joe struggles with whether he can keep working there if they are involved in such deals.
| 23 | 7 | "Judge, Jury & Executioner" | Peter Werner | Bruce Miller | November 7, 2005 | 11.61 |
Allison has a strange dream and Joe gets called to jury duty. Joe is picked to be on a jury and Allison soon realizes her dream was about the defendant in Joe's case, Stephen Garner (James Patrick Stuart). Stephen's wife, Jessica, is alleged to have fallen out of a boat, and her body has not been found. Devalos finds Allison looking through the case files and tells her that the case is complicated enough as it is: since the body has not been found, Devalos can only pursue a lesser charge that carries the penalty of 4–5 years in prison. Devalos then demands that Allison stay away from the case because if anyone finds out she is involved in any capacity, it will be declared a mistrial. This leaves Allison in a difficult spot because Joe begs her to tell him about the dreams, but she cannot do so. Allison dreams that Stephen hunted Jessica down in the woods like a deer, shot her in the back, and dismembered her body; she never made it on to the boat. The other jury members think it is obvious that Stephen is not guilty, but Joe is not so sure; he insists that they look over the case files one more time, but without any concrete evidence, Joe is forced to go along with their verdict of not guilty. Since the trial is over, Allison looks through the case files and figures out Jessica's body is located in the woods near her father's hunting lodge. Scanlon finds Jessica's dismembered body while Devalos and Jessica's father look on. Angry and consumed by grief, Jessica's father lures Stephen out to the hunting lodge and kills Stephen the same way he killed Jessica.
| 24 | 8 | "Too Close to Call" | Steven Robman | René Echevarria | November 14, 2005 | 12.53 |
DA Devalos is running for re-election, but Allison dreams that a murder will ruin his chances of re-election. One of Allison's dreams contains an ad that Devalos' rival, Nathan Bradley, will run after the rape and murder of a young woman—the murderer is Clyde Morton, a man who Devalos refused to try as an adult for a crime he committed three years earlier—and Bradley sitting at Devalos' desk, implying he won the election. Devalos tells Allison that Clyde is out of prison and to not pursue the lead unless she can give him the name of the girl. Allison disobeys him and calls Scanlon, and they go to Clyde Morton's house only to find he isn't home. As they are leaving, Clyde approaches the house and when Scanlon calls his name, Clyde runs out into the road and gets hit by a car. Despite Clyde being in the ICU, Allison dreams again about the girl's murder, with only a minor change in her wardrobe. When Clyde wakes up from his coma, Allison and Scanlon go to visit him only to find the girl from her dream at his bedside and in the same clothes she was wearing in the most recent dream. The girl's name is Cathy, and she's Clyde's girlfriend. After Cathy leaves the hospital to go home, Clyde tells them that he ran away from Scanlon because he thought he was Cathy's abusive ex who put her in the hospital the previous year, and the ex has been driving by his home recently. Allison realizes that in her dream, the killing was falsely pinned on Clyde because as Cathy's boyfriend, his DNA is all over her house. Cathy goes home and is confronted by her ex, but Scanlon is there as well and saves her life. Meanwhile, Allison and Joe bump into Karen, an old flame from Joe's past, and Allison sees a memory of their relationship, making her uncomfortable. Karen contacts Joe and asks him to go to lunch, where she tells him she wants a job at his company and needs him to put a good word in for her because she never finished her Master's degree, a requirement for the job. Karen then attempts to seduce Joe, but he rebuffs her, tells her she is unqualified for the job, and leaves.
| 25 | 9 | "Still Life" | Robert Duncan McNeill | Craig Sweeny | November 21, 2005 | 13.41 |
Allison has a recurring dream about Gloria Soto being stabbed, which leads her to an investigation concluding that Gloria was stabbed in order to hide the secret of someone close to her. When Allison and Detective Scanlon visit potential suspect Jason Morrow, Allison finds multiple paintings of Gloria, each of which give her visions of how she was killed and where she was buried. While they are holding Jason in prison for 24 hours, Detective Scanlon finds the skeletons of a woman and male child under a tree with shoes hanging off the branches, which fits the dream Allison had about the disposal of Gloria's body. The problem is, the bodies are skeletons and have been buried for over 20 years. Allison's visions were actually of Gloria's mother, Inez, who happened to work for Jason's father, David Morrow (John Shea) before she was killed in 1982. Thus, Jason couldn't have possibly killed Inez since he was an infant. Allison realizes that Jason witnessed the murder of Inez when he was an infant, and the paintings are not of Gloria, but instead of her mother Inez, since they look exactly alike and Jason's paintings are actually subconscious memories of Inez' murder. There were two babies: David's son, Jason Morrow, and Inez' son. Since David's wife, Emily, had AIDS, she passed it to her son, Jason, in utero. David killed his own son because he had AIDS and killed Inez so that he could raise Inez' healthy son as Jason Morrow. That way, David would be able to live off of Jason Morrow's money (inherited from David's wife, Emily) for the rest of his life. Meanwhile, one of Joe's coworkers is leaving the company to start his own company and asks Joe to join him as a co-partner. While it is an intriguing offer, Joe ultimately declines, not wanting to work 70 hours a week for a long period of time. In its original broadcast and on DVD, portions of this episode are presented in anaglyph 3D.
| 26 | 10 | "The Reckoning" | Aaron Lipstadt | Moira Kirland | November 28, 2005 | 12.23 |
Allison goes to a restaurant, and when she sees a woman named Nadine, she has a vision of her crying and her husband yelling at her. Allison approaches her and gives her a business card. Nadine is found dead the next day in her home with a gunshot wound to the head, and her husband James claims he was asleep at the time and that it was a suicide, since Nadine has depression. That night, Allison's dream picks up where the last one left off: James storms out of the bedroom and smokes in the kitchen while Nadine freaks out when the lights flicker on and off and the stereo goes on randomly. Nadine turns the stereo off, only for it to play again, and James hears a gunshot. The next day, Allison drives by a memorial for Melanie, who was killed in a hit and run a year earlier. She has a vision of James hitting Melanie with the car; he flees the scene despite Nadine begging him to call 911. Allison thinks Nadine killed herself due to the guilt she felt for never going to the cops. When Devalos calls James in for questioning, he falsely claims Nadine was driving the car. Allison has another dream: James found Nadine alive with the gun in her hand, but when she insisted on calling the cops to confess to the hit and run, James didn't call for help and let Nadine die. Allison goes for a drive and Nadine's ghost appears. She tells her Melanie's ghost has moved on and Melanie arranged for them to meet in the diner so that Nadine had a chance to confess, but she didn't do so. Nadine is angry that James sat there for the 27 minutes it took her to die and didn't confess to Devalos earlier that day, so she blew the pilot light on the stove. James, having a cold, didn't smell the gas and lit a cigarette, leading to a fire; Allison then hears sirens in the distance. Meanwhile, Ariel invites a few girls over to make more friends. When Celeste calls her boring, Ariel uses her abilities to impress her, but sees an older Celeste looking really sick in the hospital. Joe wants to warm Celeste's parents. It turns out that Celeste's cousin, who looks just like her, has leukemia.
| 27 | 11 | "Method to His Madness" | Peter Werner | Robert Doherty | January 2, 2006 | 13.58 |
A dead serial killer's ego disrupts Allison's life when his "reputation" is on the line. He makes Allison see how he chose his victims (little to no makeup) and the way he mutilated their bodies. Allison's habits begin to emulate those of the serial killer. It starts small with her beginning to smoke, and then escalates when she follows a girl from the grocery store home and watches her for hours. Joe, worried about their daughters' safety, removes them from the house until Allison starts acting like herself again. Allison struggles with why the serial killer is putting such emphasis on how he chose his victims until she realizes that since the third victim, Julie, doesn't fit the profile (she wears too much makeup), someone else must have killed her. Devalos informs Allison that DNA from Julie's fingernails matches the serial killer and that since the specifics of the marks on the bodies were not released to the public, only the serial killer could've done it. Allison thinks otherwise, though, and realizes the medical examiner is the one who killed Julie. Since she had access to the other victims' bodies, she mimicked the cuts so that Julie's murder would be attributed to the serial killer, and she tampered with the DNA sample from Julie's fingernails to throw Devalos and Allison off her trail. When Allison confronts the medical examiner, she tells her that her long-time husband was going to leave her for Julie. When she confronted her, Julie was dismissive and rude, so the medical examiner snapped and killed her.
| 28 | 12 | "Doctor's Orders" | Helen Shaver | René Echevarria | January 9, 2006 | 11.39 |
This episode is a continuation of the first season episode, "Penny for Your Thoughts." Allison begins to dream of Dr. Charles Walker (Mark Sheppard) mentoring doctors to murder again. Ariel has a crush on an 8th grader named Todd Gromada and asks her parents if she can go on a group date with Todd and his friends, but Allison and Joe say no because she is too young. When Allison drives her to school one day, Ariel tells her that Todd's father, who is in the car behind them, is a doctor. Allison subsequently sees Dr. Gromada (James Eckhouse) in his car while Dr. Walker is whispering in his ear. Dr. Walker appears to Ariel at school, says that he is a new librarian, and convinces her to disobey her parents and sneak out to Todd's house for a pool party. Allison has dreams that Dr. Gromada, under Dr. Walker's influence, will make Ariel his victim, so when she realizes Ariel has snuck out of the house to see Todd, she drives to Todd's house. Dr. Walker appears at the party, tells Ariel that her mom is on her way to the party, and beckons her to follow him; thinking the glass door is open, Ariel walks into it and suffers a bloody nose. Allison arrives at the house and when she sees Dr. Gromada treating Ariel's bloody nose, she attacks him because the details of the scene match her dream about Dr. Gromada killing Ariel. Allison is subsequently arrested for assault, and Dr. Walker appears in her cell to tell Allison that he misled her into thinking Dr. Gromada was the person he was trying to influence because he needed to get her off his trail. Allison realizes that an earlier dream about a butcher in a grocery store killing a female coworker under Dr. Walker's influence is the real deal, and she manages to alert Scanlon. Just as the butcher is about to kill his coworker, Scanlon arrives and saves her life. When Dr. Gromada is told about Allison's role in saving the grocery store worker's life, he drops all charges and Allison is freed.
| 29 | 13 | "Raising Cain" | Ed Sherin | Craig Sweeny | January 23, 2006 | 11.44 |
Allison helps save the life of a little boy named Tyler who was drugged, shot, and left for dead in a waste dump. While Tyler's parents maintain that an unknown person is responsible, Allison has visions that Tyler's mother tried to kill him because she believes her son is evil. The case becomes more complex when Allison realizes that her dreams about a boy who grows up to be a school shooter is actually a version of Tyler's future. She has another dream that shows a different version of Tyler's future: he becomes valedictorian and thanks his mom for his success in his graduation speech. Allison realizes that Tyler's mom has been having the same dreams as her and visits her home. Allison tells Tyler's mom that she is the key to which future Tyler will have. Later that night, Devalos calls Allison and informs her that Tyler's mom committed suicide. When she goes to sleep, she dreams about Tyler's graduation speech again, but it is extended and reveals that it was his mom's suicide that had such an impact on him. Meanwhile, Ariel gets her own bedroom.
| 30 | 14 | "A Changed Man" | Lewis H. Gould | Bruce Miller | February 6, 2006 | 12.04 |
Allison falls on the floor in her house, hits her head, and subsequently has trouble with her memory. When Allison goes for an MRI, Joe thinks an abnormality in her brain is possibly responsible for her unique abilities and insists on testing their daughters; while Bridgette has the abnormality, Ariel does not, so it isn't responsible for their abilities. At the clinic, Allison meets David Saunders (Richmond Arquette), a man who has amnesia due to being shot in the head, and she has visions indicating he was a prostitute murderer before his brain injury. While Allison sees all of the victims, the only one she can identify is a woman who went by the street name Jade; she has been missing since 1998. When Allison goes to David's copy shop, she shows him the flyer made at the time of Jade's disappearance and asks him to make copies. David calls out for his wife, Angela, and when she comes out of the back room, Allison realizes that Angela is actually Jade. Angela later confides in Allison that she and her pimp made a deal for the pimp to rob the houses of whoever she slept with, but while she was with David, the pimp broke a lamp and alerted him to his presence; the pimp is the one who shot David in the head. Angela begs Allison to not pursue the case because she never told David that she was a prostitute or that she was the reason he was shot. After Allison has another vision and Devalos finds a traffic stop photo of David and one of his victims in the passenger seat of his car, they call him in for questioning. David cracks under pressure, admits he remembers Angela is actually Jade, and takes Devalos, Allison, and Scanlon to the desert to show them where he buried the remains of his victims.
| 31 | 15 | "Sweet Child O' Mine" | Perry Lang | Moira Kirland | February 27, 2006 | 10.43 |
On the anniversary of Allison's miscarriage of her son, she investigates the death of a woman named Cristin Moorhouse, who was the manager of a coffee shop. The prime suspect is 15-year-old Jesse Andrews, a former employee at the coffee shop, and he reminds Allison of her lost child. Allison has dreams through the perspective of Jesse's mother, Dr. Andrews, and realizes that she dumped Jesse's bloody clothes in a dumpster. Jesse confesses to the crime and when he comes back to Devalos' office with Dr. Andrews, Devalos offers a deal of four years in a juvenile detention center on account of his age. When Allison looks at Cristin's autopsy again, she sees that the coroner noted she gave birth to a child at some point, which contradicts her estranged husband's statement that they had issues having children. Allison discovers that Cristin had a son 15 years earlier who died shortly after birth, and Dr. Andrews signed the death certificate despite supposedly giving birth to a son on the same day. Allison confronts Dr. Andrews, who admits that she forged the death certificate and raised Cristin's son as her own because Cristin was high at the time of the birth and asked how much money she could get for selling her newborn child. Dr. Andrews also admits that when Jesse was fired from the coffee shop, she came to pick him up and Cristin recognized her as the doctor who was on call when she gave birth to her son. Cristin realized that Jesse was actually her son and threatened to sue Dr. Andrews to get her son back, so Dr. Andrews killed her. When Jesse went to the coffee shop to talk to Cristin a few hours later, he found her dead body, which explains why his clothes had her blood on them. Dr. Andrews begs Allison not to say anything because Jesse will end up in foster care if she goes to jail and at least when he comes out of jail, she will be there for him. While Allison's decision is not shown on screen, it is implied that she didn't turn Dr. Andrews in. Meanwhile, Bridgette finds a sick dog that will die within a week, and Joe struggles with how to tell her the bad news. When Joe finally tells her, however, Bridgette reveals that she knew all along the dog was dying and didn't want to tell him because she feared he would be upset due to his attachment to the dog.
| 32 | 16 | "Allison Wonderland" | Ronald L. Schwary | Bernadette McNamara & Michael T. Moore | March 6, 2006 | 10.67 |
Devalos asks Allison to work on the case of a man who has been missing for two weeks because his sister, Jessica (Rebecca Gayheart), is an acquaintance. She dreams that the man was pushed off a roof while trying to "complete a mission" for someone and is dead. The man's ghost appears to her in the form of a movie star (David Carradine), and since the man has a history of mental illness, she has to decipher which of his memories are real and which ones are fantasy. When Allison and Scanlon go to the man's apartment, they find various complex mathematical equations, and the man's ghost appears to tell her that he was at a hotel in Los Angeles. Scanlon goes to Los Angeles and discovers that the man, who the authorities were having trouble identifying, has been dead for two days after falling off the hotel roof. Allison insists that he was pushed and solves the case: Jessica's husband, a former bank executive, manipulated his easily misled brother-in-law into using his mathematical genius to hack into the bank's system so that Jessica's husband could get more money for himself. He then had his brother-in-law killed when he was no longer useful. Meanwhile, after Bridgette is told there will be no more installments of her favorite book series, she writes another installment herself.
| 33 | 17 | "Lucky in Love" | David Jones | Robert Doherty | March 13, 2006 | 10.30 |
Allison dreams her brother, Michael, is involved in a bank robbery, so she becomes worried when the bank in her dream is robbed in real life and Michael comes to town for a visit. Michael meets a woman at a bar and becomes involved with her, but she may have been involved in a real robbery. It is revealed that the woman he has been seeing is actually a ghost, which explains why Allison could also see her.
| 34 | 18 | "S.O.S." | Tim Squyres | Rob Pearlstein | April 17, 2006 | 10.76 |
Bridgette finds a bloody backpack while on a hike with Allison, Joe, and her sisters. Joe investigates and finds the dead body of an 18-year-old college student. Allison dreamt about the victim slipping and falling from a cliff, but she actually survived the fall with only a broken ankle; she was subsequently dragged away into the bushes, raped, and strangled to death. When another girl is raped and murdered, it is clear there is a serial rapist/murderer on the loose. Allison has a dream about a third girl being targeted and warns her in time, but the would-be victim tells the press that Allison called her to warn her about the intruder trying to get into her house. Allison is forced to lie in a press conference to protect her secret. The serial rapist/murderer calls Allison's house, tells her that he has the same abilities as her, and says he is outside her house before driving away and hanging up the phone. Allison dreams the killer's whereabouts and informs Scanlon; the killer is arrested. Meanwhile, Bridgette has to talk about one of her parents' jobs for show-and-tell at school, so she begins to wonder what Allison really does at the DA's office. After lying at the press conference, Allison tells Ariel and Bridgette that people don't understand their abilities, so it is important to not talk about it with anyone outside the family. Bridgette does a revised show-and-tell at school that both talks about her job and protects her mother's secret.
| 35 | 19 | "Knowing Her" | David Paymer | Glenn Gordon Caron | April 24, 2006 | 9.76 |
Allison is puzzled by dreams of Detective Scanlon doing drugs on the eve of his wedding. A woman who belongs to a drug dealer family comes to Lee looking for information about her dead "drug mules." Ariel is doubtful when her essay is chosen as the "winner" of a contest while another student's essay seemed much better.
| 36 | 20 | "The Darkness Is Light Enough" | Aaron Lipstadt | Ken Kelsch & Nicolas Wauters & Analisa Brouet | May 1, 2006 | 10.16 |
Allison dreams of a woman being visited in the night by a man who steals a kiss. She discovers a connection between the dream and an innocent man who is in jail for a murder someone else committed.
| 37 | 21 | "Death Takes a Policy" | Ed Sherin | Diane Ademu-John | May 8, 2006 | 11.44 |
Allison is plagued by dreams of her own demise, with an enigmatic man of whom she thinks as the Angel of Death (Kelsey Grammer). While helping the DA investigate the murder of a doctor, Allison discovers who the "Angel of Death" really is.
| 38 | 22 | "Twice Upon a Time" | Ronald L. Schwary | René Echevarria | May 22, 2006 | 10.04 |
Distressed from work, Allison falls asleep and dreams of a whole new life in which she is a successful attorney. But in her new life, she still has psychic visions which her new "husband" dismisses.
