= Medium season 4 =

Medium
- Season 4
- DVD cover
- No. of episodes: 16

Release
- Original network: NBC
- Original release: January 7 – May 12, 2008

Season chronology
- ← Previous; Season 3 Next → Season 5

The fourth season of Medium, an American television series, began January 7, 2008, and ended on May 12, 2008. It aired on NBC.

== Production ==
Renewal for a fourth season of Medium was announced on May 7, 2007, with an undetermined premiere date and number of episodes. It was the seventh series to be renewed by the network, behind solid performers Heroes and Law & Order: Special Victims Unit. One week later, the network announced that Medium would move to the Sunday 9 p.m. time slot upon its return in January 2008. News on the series' return did not come until December 2007 when NBC announced that the fourth season would begin in January in its original Monday 10 p.m. time slot, despite the WGA Strike of 2007, which forced the show to cease production, allowing for only nine episodes to be filmed. Scheduling returning mid-season shows in timeslots where they were previously successful was a pattern for NBC during the strike: Law & Order returned to Wednesdays at 10 and The Apprentice was back on Thursdays at 9:00 p.m.

== Plot ==
Allison's world is turned upside down after her gifts were revealed to the world at the end of the previous season. Manuel and Allison both lose their jobs and Scanlon, damaged by his closeness to Allison, is assigned demeaning public relations work by the new District Attorney Van Dyke. While struggling to balance the ever growing media attention and the visions that haunt her, Allison meets Cynthia Keener (Anjelica Huston), an investigator with "Ameri-Tips" who personally hires her to help solve crimes under the table. Somewhat of a skeptic, Cynthia has her doubts about Allison's abilities but continues to pay her for her services, until Allison begins to have dreams about Cynthia's missing daughter. The missing case becomes present when another girl goes missing in the same manner. Allison and Cynthia work together to stop the killer and put her daughter's body to rest. In a shocking twist, Cynthia murders her daughter's killer but immediately calls the police, accepting the consequences of her actions.

Meanwhile, Joe meets his new partner at work, Megan Doyle (Kelly Preston), who begins to worry Allison when she comes onto Joe at work. But Megan's hidden intentions are revealed when she steals his idea for a new invention and he is forced to sell her the rights. At the end of the season, a sense of order is restored when Van Dyke steps down after being given only a few months to live due to cancer. Manuel returns to the office. Allison gets her job back at the District Attorney's office and the relationship between her and Scanlon is mended.

== Cast and characters ==
=== Main cast ===
- Patricia Arquette as Allison DuBois
- Miguel Sandoval as Manuel Devalos
- David Cubitt as Lee Scanlon
- Sofia Vassilieva as Ariel DuBois
- Feodor Lark as Bridgette DuBois
- Jake Weber as Joe DuBois

=== Recurring cast ===
- Madison and Miranda Carabello as Marie DuBois
- Tina DiJoseph as Lynn DiNovi
- Anjelica Huston as Cynthia Keener
- Kelly Preston as Meghan Doyle
- Bruce Gray as Joe's Dad
- Kathy Baker as Marjorie Dubois
- Ned Schmidtke as Terry Cavanaugh

== Episodes ==
| No. overall | No. in season | Title | Directed by | Written by | Original release date | U.S. viewers (millions) |
|---|---|---|---|---|---|---|
| 61 | 1 | "And Then" | Aaron Lipstadt | Glenn Gordon Caron | January 7, 2008 | 9.60 |
Allison begins having disturbing dreams about a young boy snatched from a toy store while shopping with his dad. Unable to turn to Devalos or Scanlon for help, Allison calls Ameri-Tips, a company hired by the missing boy's family, and strikes an unusual deal with their intriguing investigator Cynthia Keener (Anjelica Huston).
| 62 | 2 | "But for the Grace of God" | Peter Markle | René Echevarria | January 14, 2008 | 9.51 |
Allison is distressed by a vision of her daughter in a car crash, but helps Ameri-Tips find a local missing teenager. Meanwhile, Ariel dreams that she is one of Allison's classmates in high school and finds herself liking young Allison (Jennifer Lawrence).
| 63 | 3 | "To Have and to Hold" | Aaron Lipstadt | Robert Doherty | January 21, 2008 | 10.02 |
Joe's job search takes an unexpected turn when Joe has to rely on Allison to find his prospective employer's missing daughter in order to secure a job.
| 64 | 4 | "Do You Hear What I Hear?" | David Arquette | Corey Reed & Travis Donnelly | February 18, 2008 | 8.45 |
Allison completely loses her hearing when a wealthy, young deaf girl is kidnapped, so Joe steps in to assist her and investigator Cynthia Keener's actions on behalf of the parents. What initially appears to be an open-and-shut ransom case becomes more complicated when Allison realizes the young girl's stepfather (Steven Culp) is involved in orchestrating the kidnapping and the young girl's life might be in serious danger.
| 65 | 5 | "Girls Ain't Nothing But Trouble" | Vincent Misiano | Moira Kirland | February 25, 2008 | 7.61 |
Allison's long-standing nemesis, defense attorney Larry Watt decides to use her powers to his advantage, for a change, by hiring her as a consultant. Unfortunately, Allison's dreams tell her that his client is guilty of killing his wife. Meanwhile, Devalos and Ariel individually start new ventures.
| 66 | 6 | "Aftertaste" | Miguel Sandoval | Craig Sweeny | March 3, 2008 | 9.08 |
Allison does her best to support Devalos' bid to reclaim the D.A.'s office, as her visions place his strongest political supporter and longtime friend Senator Jed Garrity in the center of a horrific conspiracy. Meanwhile, Bridgette has a dream about a persistent creditor, calling from a world away.
| 67 | 7 | "Burn Baby Burn (Part I)" | Leon Ichaso | Javier Grillo-Marxuach | March 10, 2008 | 9.34 |
When her mother-in-law Marjorie Dubois comes to visit, Allison learns the real reason why and struggles with her plea to not discuss it with Joe, the one person with whom she has no secrets. Meanwhile, Ameritips investigator Cynthia Keener hopes to nudge Allison's gifts to her open cases. Later, an arson-related murder brings Allison, Devalos and Scanlon back together in an unexpected manner.
| 68 | 8 | "Burn Baby Burn (Part II)" | Vincent Misiano | René Echevarria & Javier Grillo-Marxuach | March 17, 2008 | 10.07 |
While struggling to keep her mother-in-law's secret from Joe, Allison attempts to find the link between her dreams, a case she's working on for Cynthia Keener, Devalos' arson-related murder case, and Ariel's prediction of the death of an acquaintance's mother.
| 69 | 9 | "Wicked Game (Part I)" | Peter Werner | Diane Ademu-John | March 24, 2008 | 8.91 |
Allison discovers a secret from Ameritips investigator Cynthia Keener's past while looking for a missing local girl named Melanie. Cynthia's own daughter, Suzie (Sarah Drew), went missing from a mall parking lot in 1998 and has not been found. Allison dreams that Suzie was held captive in a fall-out shelter with another girl named Joanna Wheeler (Lily Rabe) only a few blocks away from Suzie's home. When Cynthia and Allison visit the home containing the fall-out shelter, however, an elderly woman is now in residence and doesn't remember who sold the house to her. They also find Joanna alive and well in her mother's knitting shop, and Cynthia fires Allison out of anger. Allison's unemployment doesn't last, though: Cynthia rehires Allison after Melanie escapes her captor and contacts the police. When Allison turns on the news, she discovers the kidnapper is dead and that Joanna Wheeler was held captive alongside Melanie and rescued. Cynthia believes Allison mixed up Suzie and Melanie's faces in her dreams, but Allison isn't so sure. Allison's belief in her dream's accuracy is strengthened when the current owner of the house and fall-out shelter sends her a fax containing a photo of the previous owner, Peter Campbell, and he looks just like Suzie's kidnapper. Meanwhile, Joe's relationship with Allison is tested when Bridgette's science class project sparks his imagination.
| 70 | 10 | "Wicked Game (Part II)" | Arlene Sanford | Robert Doherty | March 31, 2008 | 9.65 |
Cynthia and Allison investigate whether the recent kidnapping of a local girl named Melanie and Cynthia's daughter Suzie in 1998 are related. Joanna Wheeler is determined to be the common denominator in both cases when Allison realizes her previous dreams about Joanna being kept in the fall-out shelter with Suzie were correct. Allison continues to have dreams about Joanna, which reveal she is a psychopath who masterminded Suzie's kidnapping and forced her then-boyfriend Peter Campbell to take part, and that Joanna killed her most recent boyfriend and let Melanie escape after realizing Cynthia and Allison were on her trail. Allison also has a dream in which Cynthia and Suzie are reunited before Suzie walks into a scenic lake and doesn't resurface. Cynthia and Allison track down Peter Campbell, and while he denies involvement in Suzie's kidnapping, his resolve is visibly cracking. While driving back to Phoenix, Allison sees the lake from her most recent dream and tells Cynthia about her dream; Suzie's skeleton is subsequently recovered from the bottom of the lake. Peter Campbell is soon found dead and with no physical evidence to connect Joanna to Suzie's murder, Cynthia takes matters into her own hands and kills Joanna herself. When Allison realizes what happened, Cynthia says that since she failed to stand up for Suzie in life, she killed Joanna in an attempt to make amends and has made peace with the fact that she will go to prison. Meanwhile, after helping Bridgette with her science project, Joe gets a prediction from his middle daughter about his future finances.
| 71 | 11 | "Lady Killer" | Peter Werner | Davah Feliz Avena | April 7, 2008 | 10.86 |
Allison teams up with Scanlon to locate a dangerous "cougar" who is believed to be responsible for the savage murders of two young men. Meanwhile, as the campaign for local D.A. gets underway, Allison senses that someone close to Devalos is plotting against him. Rosanna Arquette guest stars in this episode as a writer who writes books for women who are searching for younger men.
| 72 | 12 | "Partners in Crime" | Vincent Misiano | Robert Doherty & Craig Sweeny | April 14, 2008 | 9.76 |
Venture capitalist Meghan Doyle (Kelly Preston) likes what she sees when Joe makes a presentation on his new solar power-based invention to her investment firm. Meanwhile, FBI profiler Agent Edward Cooper tries to convince Allison he's back in Phoenix to track down, not murder, another serial killer, but her dreams tell her a different story.
| 73 | 13 | "A Cure For What Ails You" | Arlene Sanford | Corey Reed & Travis Donnelly | April 21, 2008 | 9.79 |
Allison struggles to see the connection between several recent "accidental" deaths after experiencing visions of Scanlon and girlfriend Lynn DiNovi's friend dying in a home mishap and a scary trip to the hospital herself. Meanwhile, Joe must find a cheap, inventive answer to Marie's need for glasses after she inadvertently tricks the optometrist.
| 74 | 14 | "Car Trouble" | Peter Werner | René Echevarria & Ralph Glenn Howard | April 28, 2008 | 9.68 |
When Allison's old automobile sputters and dies, Joe surprises her with an immaculate used car, after being tipped off to a great deal. Unfortunately, the Dubois family discovers that the car is at the center of a horrific, unsolved crime involving the wife of Tim Carmer (Joshua Malina), the man who sold Joe the car. Meanwhile, Allison meets Joe's new business partner Meghan Doyle for the first time and begins to feel uneasy about the attractive venture capitalist.
| 75 | 15 | "Being Joey Carmichael" | Arlene Sanford | Robert Doherty & Craig Sweeny | May 5, 2008 | 9.57 |
Allison's visions help Scanlon get a lead on the person responsible for a meticulous, brutal hit on a wealthy local drug dealer, but both are confused when her dreams of a charming killer direct them to Joey Carmichael, a severely impaired man with a bullet lodged in his brain. Meanwhile, an awkward moment between venture capitalist Meghan Doyle and Joe could tear their business partnership apart.
| 76 | 16 | "Drowned World" | Aaron Lipstadt | Moira Kirland | May 12, 2008 | 8.73 |
Allison is asked to investigate whether a young couple's house is haunted and discovers that a baby drowned on the property long ago. After the wife dies of an apparent suicide, Allison discovers a strange connection between the two deaths. Meanwhile, Meghan and Joe end their partnership, and Devalos is reinstalled as DA, after Van Dyke's health prevents him from continuing in the position.
