= List of Medium episodes =

This is a list of episodes for the NBC/CBS television series Medium. The show's title is a reference to the main character, Allison DuBois (portrayed by Patricia Arquette), a psychic medium given dreams from the Powers That Be, to help solve crimes for the district attorney of Phoenix, Arizona. The series began on NBC on January 3, 2005, running for five seasons, all of which are currently on DVD. It was canceled in May 2009, but was quickly picked up by CBS and renewed for a sixth season which began on September 25, 2009. On May 18, 2010, the show announced it would run for 22 more episodes making it the show's 7th and final season; however, the order was later reduced to 13. The series finale aired on January 21, 2011. Overall, 130 episodes of Medium were produced.

== Series overview ==
Season	Episodes	Originally released			Rank	Rating
Season	Episodes	First released	Last released	Network	Rank	Rating
1	16	January 3, 2005	May 23, 2005	NBC	18	9.1
2	22	September 19, 2005	May 22, 2006	NBC	—N/a	—N/a
3	22	November 15, 2006	May 16, 2007	NBC	—N/a	—N/a
4	16	January 7, 2008	May 12, 2008	NBC	—N/a	—N/a
5	19	February 2, 2009	June 1, 2009	NBC	—N/a	—N/a
6	22	September 25, 2009	May 21, 2010	CBS	—N/a	—N/a
7	13	September 24, 2010	January 21, 2011	CBS	—N/a	—N/a

== Episodes ==
=== Season 1 (2005) ===
No. overall	No. in season	Title	Directed by	Written by	Original release date	Prod. code	U.S. viewers (millions)
1	1	"Pilot"	Glenn Gordon Caron	Glenn Gordon Caron	January 3, 2005	001	16.09
2	2	"Suspicions and Certainties"	Vincent Misiano	Glenn Gordon Caron	January 10, 2005	002	16.34
3	3	"A Couple of Choices"	Jeff Bleckner	Michael Angeli & Glenn Gordon Caron	January 17, 2005	009	14.44
4	4	"Night of the Wolf"	Artie Mandelberg	René Echevarria	January 24, 2005	003	15.78
5	5	"In Sickness and Adultery"	Aaron Lipstadt	Michael Angeli	January 31, 2005	006	15.85
6	6	"Coming Soon"	Vincent Misiano	Moira Kirland	February 7, 2005	004	13.97
7	7	"Jump Start"	Artie Mandelberg	Melinda Hsu	February 14, 2005	008	14.52
8	8	"Lucky"	Peter Werner	David Folwell	February 21, 2005	007	13.77
9	9	"Coded"	Bill L. Norton	Moira Kirland	February 28, 2005	010	15.28
10	10	"The Other Side of the Tracks"	Eric Laneuville	Chris Dingess	March 14, 2005	005	15.35
11	11	"I Married a Mind Reader"	Duane Clark	René Echevarria	March 21, 2005	011	11.68
12	12	"A Priest, a Doctor, and a Medium Walk into an Execution Chamber"	Bill L. Norton	Chris Dingess	March 28, 2005	012	13.71
13	13	"Being Mrs. O'Leary's Cow"	Ronald L. Schwary	Melinda Hsu	April 25, 2005	013	14.43
14	14	"In the Rough"	Duane Clark	René Echevarria	May 2, 2005	015	12.74
15	15	"Penny for Your Thoughts"	Aaron Lipstadt	Moira Kirland	May 9, 2005	014	12.79
16	16	"When Push Comes to Shove (Part I)"	Aaron Lipstadt	Chris Dingess	May 23, 2005	016	11.79

=== Season 2 (2005–06) ===
No. overall	No. in season	Title	Directed by	Written by	Original release date	U.S. viewers (millions)
17	1	"When Push Comes to Shove (Part II)"	Aaron Lipstadt	Glenn Gordon Caron	September 19, 2005	12.69
18	2	"The Song Remains the Same"	Vincent Misiano	Bruce Miller	September 26, 2005	13.24
19	3	"Time Out of Mind"	Arliss Howard	Robert Doherty	October 3, 2005	12.89
20	4	"Light Sleeper"	Elodie Keene	Peter Egan	October 10, 2005	12.68
21	5	"Sweet Dreams"	Aaron Lipstadt	Moira Kirland	October 17, 2005	11.94
22	6	"Dead Aim"	Richard Pearce	Melinda Hsu	October 24, 2005	12.76
23	7	"Judge, Jury & Executioner"	Peter Werner	Bruce Miller	November 7, 2005	11.61
24	8	"Too Close to Call"	Steven Robman	René Echevarria	November 14, 2005	12.53
25	9	"Still Life"	Robert Duncan McNeill	Craig Sweeny	November 21, 2005	13.41
26	10	"The Reckoning"	Aaron Lipstadt	Moira Kirland	November 28, 2005	12.23
27	11	"Method to His Madness"	Peter Werner	Robert Doherty	January 2, 2006	13.58
28	12	"Doctor's Orders"	Helen Shaver	René Echevarria	January 9, 2006	11.39
29	13	"Raising Cain"	Ed Sherin	Craig Sweeny	January 23, 2006	11.44
30	14	"A Changed Man"	Lewis H. Gould	Bruce Miller	February 6, 2006	12.04
31	15	"Sweet Child O' Mine"	Perry Lang	Moira Kirland	February 27, 2006	10.43
32	16	"Allison Wonderland"	Ronald L. Schwary	Bernadette McNamara & Michael T. Moore	March 6, 2006	10.67
33	17	"Lucky in Love"	David Jones	Robert Doherty	March 13, 2006	10.30
34	18	"S.O.S."	Tim Squyres	Rob Pearlstein	April 17, 2006	10.76
35	19	"Knowing Her"	David Paymer	Glenn Gordon Caron	April 24, 2006	9.76
36	20	"The Darkness Is Light Enough"	Aaron Lipstadt	Ken Kelsch & Nicolas Wauters & Analisa Brouet	May 1, 2006	10.16
37	21	"Death Takes a Policy"	Ed Sherin	Diane Ademu-John	May 8, 2006	11.44
38	22	"Twice Upon a Time"	Ronald L. Schwary	René Echevarria	May 22, 2006	10.04

=== Season 3 (2006–07) ===
No. overall	No. in season	Title	Directed by	Written by	Original release date	U.S. viewers (millions)
39	1	"Four Dreams (Part I)"	Aaron Lipstadt	Glenn Gordon Caron & Javier Grillo-Marxuach	November 15, 2006	9.44
40	2	"Four Dreams (Part II)"	Aaron Lipstadt	Glenn Gordon Caron & Javier Grillo-Marxuach	November 15, 2006	9.44
41	3	"Be Kind, Rewind"	Aaron Lipstadt	Ken Schefler	November 22, 2006	7.45
42	4	"Blood Relations"	Oz Scott	Robert Doherty	November 29, 2006	8.01
43	5	"Ghost in the Machine"	Andy Wolk	Moira Kirland	December 6, 2006	8.58
44	6	"Profiles in Terror"	Peter Werner	Craig Sweeny	December 13, 2006	9.96
45	7	"Mother's Little Helper"	Vincent Misiano	Moira Kirland	January 3, 2007	9.33
46	8	"The Whole Truth"	Leslie Libman	Diane Ademu-John	January 17, 2007	8.95
47	9	"Better Off Dead"	Janice Cooke-Leonard	Robert Doherty	January 24, 2007	8.72
48	10	"Very Merry Maggie"	Arliss Howard	Craig Sweeny	January 31, 2007	9.90
49	11	"Apocalypse, Push"	Aaron Lipstadt	Javier Grillo-Marxuach	February 7, 2007	8.15
50	12	"The One Behind the Wheel"	Leon Ichaso	Diane Ademu-John	February 14, 2007	8.62
51	13	"Second Opinion"	David Lerner	Sterling Anderson	February 21, 2007	7.84
52	14	"We Had a Dream"	Arlene Sanford	Javier Grillo-Marxuach	February 28, 2007	7.63
53	15	"The Boy Next Door"	Aaron Lipstadt	Moira Kirland	March 7, 2007	8.66
54	16	"Whatever Possessed You"	Miguel Sandoval	Robert Doherty	March 28, 2007	7.66
55	17	"Joe Day Afternoon"	Aaron Lipstadt	Ken Schefler	April 4, 2007	8.42
56	18	"1-900-LUCKY"	David Arquette	Javier Grillo-Marxuach & Robert Doherty	April 11, 2007	7.71
57	19	"No One to Watch Over Me"	Vincent Misiano	Travis Donnelly & Corey Reed	April 25, 2007	7.16
58	20	"Head Games"	Joanna Kerns	Javier Grillo-Marxuach & Robert Doherty & Moira Kirland	May 2, 2007	7.70
59	21	"Heads Will Roll"	Aaron Lipstadt	Diane Ademu-John	May 9, 2007	7.91
60	22	"Everything Comes to a Head"	Ronald L. Schwary	Ken Schefler	May 16, 2007	7.75

=== Season 4 (2008) ===
No. overall	No. in season	Title	Directed by	Written by	Original release date	U.S. viewers (millions)
61	1	"And Then"	Aaron Lipstadt	Glenn Gordon Caron	January 7, 2008	9.60
62	2	"But for the Grace of God"	Peter Markle	René Echevarria	January 14, 2008	9.51
63	3	"To Have and to Hold"	Aaron Lipstadt	Robert Doherty	January 21, 2008	10.02
64	4	"Do You Hear What I Hear?"	David Arquette	Corey Reed & Travis Donnelly	February 18, 2008	8.45
65	5	"Girls Ain't Nothing But Trouble"	Vincent Misiano	Moira Kirland	February 25, 2008	7.61
66	6	"Aftertaste"	Miguel Sandoval	Craig Sweeny	March 3, 2008	9.08
67	7	"Burn Baby Burn (Part I)"	Leon Ichaso	Javier Grillo-Marxuach	March 10, 2008	9.34
68	8	"Burn Baby Burn (Part II)"	Vincent Misiano	René Echevarria & Javier Grillo-Marxuach	March 17, 2008	10.07
69	9	"Wicked Game (Part I)"	Peter Werner	Diane Ademu-John	March 24, 2008	8.91
70	10	"Wicked Game (Part II)"	Arlene Sanford	Robert Doherty	March 31, 2008	9.65
71	11	"Lady Killer"	Peter Werner	Davah Feliz Avena	April 7, 2008	10.86
72	12	"Partners in Crime"	Vincent Misiano	Robert Doherty & Craig Sweeny	April 14, 2008	9.76
73	13	"A Cure For What Ails You"	Arlene Sanford	Corey Reed & Travis Donnelly	April 21, 2008	9.79
74	14	"Car Trouble"	Peter Werner	René Echevarria & Ralph Glenn Howard	April 28, 2008	9.68
75	15	"Being Joey Carmichael"	Arlene Sanford	Robert Doherty & Craig Sweeny	May 5, 2008	9.57
76	16	"Drowned World"	Aaron Lipstadt	Moira Kirland	May 12, 2008	8.73

=== Season 5 (2009) ===
No. overall	No. in season	Title	Directed by	Written by	Original release date	U.S. viewers (millions)
77	1	"Soul Survivor"	Aaron Lipstadt	Craig Sweeny & Robert Doherty	February 2, 2009	8.56
78	2	"Things to Do in Phoenix When You're Dead"	Aaron Lipstadt	Diane Ademu-John	February 9, 2009	7.89
79	3	"A Person of Interest"	Patricia Arquette	Robert Doherty & Craig Sweeny	February 16, 2009	8.97
80	4	"About Last Night"	Aaron Lipstadt	Ken Schefler	February 23, 2009	8.43
81	5	"A Taste of Her Own Medicine"	Ronald L. Schwary	Moira Kirland	March 2, 2009	7.26
82	6	"Apocalypse, Now?"	Larry Teng	Michael Narducci	March 9, 2009	7.13
83	7	"A Necessary Evil"	Vincent Misiano	Matt Witten	March 23, 2009	6.64
84	8	"Truth Be Told"	Ernest Dickerson	Travis Donnelly & Corey Reed	March 30, 2009	7.27
85	9	"All in the Family"	Peter Werner	Diane Ademu-John & Gary Tieche	April 6, 2009	7.17
86	10	"Then and Again"	Larry Teng	Travis Donnelly & Corey Reed	April 13, 2009	7.65
87	11	"The Devil Inside (Part I)"	Peter Werner	Diane Ademu-John	April 20, 2009	7.34
88	12	"The Devil Inside (Part II)"	Peter Werner	Michael Narducci	April 27, 2009	6.71
89	13	"How to Make a Killing in Big Business (Part I)"	Arlene Sanford & Robert Doherty	Michael Narducci & Craig Sweeny	May 4, 2009	7.24
90	14	"How to Make a Killing in Big Business (Part II)"	Arlene Sanford & Robert Doherty	Michael Narducci & Craig Sweeny	May 4, 2009	7.24
91	15	"How to Make a Killing in Big Business (Part III)"	Miguel Sandoval	Davah Avena	May 11, 2009	6.40
92	16	"The Man in the Mirror"	Aaron Lipstadt	Travis Donnelly & Corey Reed	May 11, 2009	7.30
93	17	"The First Bite Is the Deepest"	Patricia Arquette	Diane Ademu-John	May 18, 2009	6.56
94	18	"The Talented Ms. Boddicker"	Aaron Lipstadt	Michael Narducci	May 25, 2009	7.86
95	19	"Bring Me the Head of Oswaldo Castillo"	Arlene Sanford	Robert Doherty & Craig Sweeny	June 1, 2009	7.41

=== Season 6 (2009–10) ===
No. overall	No. in season	Title	Directed by	Written by	Original release date	U.S. viewers (millions)
96	1	"Déjà Vu All Over Again"	Aaron Lipstadt	Craig Sweeny & Robert Doherty	September 25, 2009	8.87
97	2	"Who's That Girl?"	Larry Teng	Corey Reed & Travis Donnelly	October 2, 2009	7.84
98	3	"Pain Killer"	Tate Donovan	Craig Sweeny & Robert Doherty	October 9, 2009	8.29
99	4	"The Medium Is the Message"	Larry Teng	Michael Narducci & Robert Doherty	October 16, 2009	8.10
100	5	"Baby Fever"	Vincent Misiano	Jordan Rosenberg	October 23, 2009	8.48
101	6	"Bite Me"	Aaron Lipstadt	Robert Doherty & Craig Sweeny	October 30, 2009	7.82
102	7	"New Terrain"	Arlene Sanford	Steve Lichtman	November 6, 2009	7.74
103	8	"Once in a Lifetime"	David Arquette	Heather Mitchell	November 13, 2009	8.16
104	9	"The Future's So Bright"	Peter Werner	Craig Sweeny & Robert Doherty	November 20, 2009	7.80
105	10	"You Give Me Fever"	Aaron Lipstadt	Jordan Rosenberg	December 4, 2009	6.96
106	11	"An Everlasting Love"	Peter Werner	Corey Reed & Travis Donnelly	January 8, 2010	8.87
107	12	"Dear Dad"	Aaron Lipstadt	Geoff Geib	January 15, 2010	8.96
108	13	"Psych"	Vincent Misiano	Diane Ademu-John & Robert Doherty	January 29, 2010	8.02
109	14	"Will the Real Fred Rovick Please Stand Up?"	Larry Reibman	Craig Sweeny & Robert Doherty	February 5, 2010	9.10
110	15	"How to Beat a Bad Guy"	Larry Teng	Michael Narducci	March 5, 2010	7.91
111	16	"Allison Rolen Got Married"	David Paymer	Heather Mitchell	March 12, 2010	7.62
112	17	"There Will Be Blood... Type A."	Arlene Sanford	Jordan Rosenberg	April 2, 2010	6.20
113	18	"There Will Be Blood... Type B."	Peter Werner	Steve Lichtman	April 9, 2010	7.54
114	19	"Sal"	Craig Sweeny	Craig Sweeny & Doug Magnuson	April 30, 2010	6.28
115	20	"Time Keeps on Slipping"	Miguel Sandoval	Heather Mitchell & Robert Doherty	May 7, 2010	7.12
116	21	"Dead Meat"	Arlene Sanford	Michael Narducci & Robert Doherty	May 14, 2010	6.22
117	22	"It's a Wonderful Death"	Aaron Lipstadt	Craig Sweeny & Shaun Kasser & Samir Mehta	May 21, 2010	6.82

=== Season 7 (2010–11) ===
No. overall	No. in season	Title	Directed by	Written by	Original release date	U.S. viewers (millions)
118	1	"Bring Your Daughter to Work Day"	Aaron Lipstadt	Michael Narducci	September 24, 2010	6.10
119	2	"The Match Game"	Larry Teng	Denise Thé	October 1, 2010	5.95
120	3	"Means and Ends"	Aaron Lipstadt	Tim Talbott	October 8, 2010	6.08
121	4	"How to Kill a Good Guy"	Larry Teng	Geoffrey Geib	October 15, 2010	5.93
122	5	"Talk to the Hand"	Colin Bucksey	Robert Doherty & Craig Sweeny	October 22, 2010	6.54
123	6	"Where Were You When?"	Peter Werner	Jordan Rosenberg	October 29, 2010	6.83
124	7	"Native Tongue"	Aaron Lipstadt	Arika Lisanne Mittman	November 5, 2010	6.97
125	8	"Smoke Damage"	Vincent Misiano	Corey Reed & Travis Donnelly	November 12, 2010	6.88
126	9	"The People in Your Neighborhood"	Peter Werner	Arika Lisanne Mittman & Jordan Rosenberg & Denise Thé	November 19, 2010	7.31
127	10	"Blood on the Tracks"	Aaron Lipstadt	Geoff Geib	December 3, 2010	6.65
128	11	"Only Half Lucky"	Larry Reibman	Corey Reed & Travis Donnelly	January 7, 2011	6.90
129	12	"Labor Pains"	Miguel Sandoval	Tim Talbott	January 14, 2011	6.61
130	13	"Me Without You"	Peter Werner	Craig Sweeny & Robert Doherty & Glenn Gordon Caron	January 21, 2011	7.87
