= Now and Again =

- Genre: Science fiction; Comedy drama
- Created by: Glenn Gordon Caron
- Starring: Eric Close; Dennis Haysbert; Margaret Colin; Heather Matarazzo; John Goodman
- Opening theme: "Gimme a Sign" performed by Ariel Ryder
- Composer: Douglas J. Cuomo
- Country of origin: United States
- Original language: English
- No. of seasons: 1
- No. of episodes: 22

Production
- Executive producers: Glenn Gordon Caron; Ronald L. Schwary
- Producer: Henry Bronchtein
- Running time: 60 minutes
- Production companies: Picturemaker Productions; CBS Productions; Paramount Network Television

Original release
- Network: CBS
- Release: September 24, 1999 – May 5, 2000

Now and Again is an American science fiction comedy-drama television series created by Glenn Gordon Caron that aired on CBS from September 24, 1999, until May 5, 2000. The story revolves around the United States government engineering the perfect human body for use in espionage, but not being able to perfect the brain. In an attempt to get the project up and running, they take the brain of overweight family man Michael Wiseman, who is killed in a train accident.

Given a new life, Michael is kept in an apartment where he is trained by government experts, led by Dr. Theodore Morris, in the art of espionage. Despite his new life and new abilities, Michael longs to return to his wife Lisa and daughter Heather, who are themselves discovering that not all is as it seems with Michael's death.

== Plot ==
Michael Wiseman (John Goodman in the pilot and flashbacks, and subsequently Eric Close) lives in suburban New York with his wife Lisa (Margaret Colin) and daughter Heather (Heather Matarazzo) and works as an executive at an insurance company. When passed over for a promotion, Michael and his friend and co-worker Roger (Gerrit Graham) go out drinking after work. While standing on the subway platform heading home that night, Michael is accidentally knocked off the platform directly into the path of an oncoming train. When he awakes, he sees Dr. Theodore Morris (Dennis Haysbert), the head of a top secret government project to artificially engineer the perfect human body. Unable to create a brain from scratch, Dr. Morris has rescued Michael's brain from his dead body and implanted it in the engineered body. The process allows Michael Wiseman to continue to live, but also forces him to work as an experiment for Dr. Morris and occasionally help fight terrorists. Because of the top-secret nature of the project, Michael is told he may never again have contact with his wife or daughter, under penalty of his own death and the death of anyone he tells of his existence. Despite the threat, Michael finds ways to contact his family while keeping his true identity a secret.

Over the course of the series, Dr. Morris continues to experiment on Michael, testing the limits of his abilities and strength. Michael is occasionally used to complete secret missions or foil criminal activity. Lisa and Heather find themselves running out of money because the insurance company refuses to pay on Michael's policy, leading Lisa to become a realtor.

== Characters ==
=== Main ===
- Michael Wiseman (Eric Close), an insurance executive who was killed in an accident; his brain has been implanted into a genetically-engineered body.
  - John Goodman plays Michael in both pilot and flashbacks
- Dr. Theodore Morris (Dennis Haysbert), the head of the top secret government project to engineer a human being
- Lisa Wiseman (née Slegermelge) (Margaret Colin), Michael's housewife widow who must learn to move on with life after her husband's death
- Heather Wiseman (Heather Matarazzo), Michael's teenage daughter
- Roger Bender (Gerrit Graham), Michael's best friend and fellow executive at the insurance company

=== Recurring ===
- The Eggman (Kim Chan), a terrorist who uses eggs to contain a deadly poisonous gas
- Gerald Misenbach (Chip Zien), a lawyer who represents Lisa in dealing with Michael's insurance company, and later a potential suitor
- Craig Spence (Chad Lowe), Michael's scheming and corrupt boss at the insurance company who is dead-set against paying on Michael's policy
- Special Agent #1 (Mike Henry), Dr. Morris' right-hand man
- Ruth Bender (Christine Baranski), Roger's never-seen wife

=== Notable guest stars ===
- In the first episode and flashback scenes in later episodes, John Goodman played Michael Wiseman in his original body.
- Reiko Aylesworth appeared as Dr. Taylor, a physical therapist for Michael Wiseman, sent to test his romantic attachment to his former wife.
- Mick Foley appeared in the final episode as the Eggman's cellmate, and assists in the Eggman's escape from prison.
- Ian Somerhalder appeared as Brian in the episode "A Girl's Life".
- Mark Margolis appeared as Nicky Vordogov in the episode "Pulp Turkey".

In addition, beginning with episode 10, Charles Durning was heard reading a brief narration at the beginning of each episode summarizing the show's backstory.

== Production and broadcast ==
The show ran for one season. Airing on Friday nights, the show was frequently preempted and received only fair ratings. The reasons cited by CBS for its cancellation included the unjustifiable expense of the program and the low ratings. Each episode of the series cost $2.4 million.

== Episodes ==
No.	Title	Directed by	Written by	Original release date	Prod. code
1	"Origins"	Glenn Gordon Caron	Glenn Gordon Caron	September 24, 1999	40306-001
Michael Wiseman's brain is taken from his dead body to be implanted inside the "perfect man", created by the U.S. Government. Dr. Theodore Morris, his caretaker, instructs him he will never see his family again.
2	"On the Town"	Christopher Misiano	Glenn Gordon Caron	October 1, 1999	40306-002
Desperate, Michael breaks free and kidnaps his old business partner, Roger, forcing him to drive to his old house. Roger, however, is unaware of who this young man is.
3	"Over Easy"	Alan Taylor	Glenn Gordon Caron	October 8, 1999	40306-003
The city receives a threat from "The Eggman" who claims he will release a poison gas. Dr. Morris takes Michael to try and stop him, unaware that Roger and Lisa – joined by Heather – are following Michael to find out who he is.
4	"One for the Money"	Susan Seidelman	Hans Tobeason	October 15, 1999	40306-004
Michael is given a mission by Dr. Morris but his moral feelings on the issue don't help his relationship with his captor; and Lisa and Heather run into money troubles.
5	"The Insurance Man Always Rings Twice"	Vincent Misiano	René Echevarria	October 22, 1999	40306-005
Michael learns that Lisa is selling his house and pleads with Dr. Morris to find out what is happening, and to save his wife by "convincing" his former boss Craig Spence to pay his insurance policy.
6	"Nothing to Fear but Nothing to Fear"	Tim Van Patten	Michael Angeli	November 5, 1999	40306-006
Michael is stunned when Lisa shows up at his apartment to ask him out, but Dr. Morris forbids his involvement; while a wave of seemingly random acts of dangerous nonchalance sweeps the city.
7	"A Girl's Life"	Bryan Spicer	Marlane Emily Gomard	November 12, 1999	40306-007
When Heather is struck by lightning, a distraught Michael convinces Dr. Morris to let him go to her bedside where she wakes and sees him outside her window, leading her to claim that an angel saved her.
8	"Pulp Turkey"	Harry Winer	Ted Humphrey	November 19, 1999	40306-008
Morris takes Michael to Thanksgiving with his own family, but their car breaks down near Lisa's house, so they stop in to call for a tow truck. But a pair of hired gunmen follow Roger to Lisa's Thanksgiving dinner to steal a Russian medal that he can't insure because of the holiday.
9	"By the Light of the Moon"	Vincent Misiano	René Echevarria	November 26, 1999	40306-009
Dr. Morris is replaced by a new doctor, Dr. Taylor (Reiko Aylesworth) who intrigues Michael; while Lisa considers her romantic feelings for her suitor, Gerald Misenbach.
10	"I've Grown Accustomed to His Face"	David Jones	Story by : Marlane Meyer; Teleplay by : René Echevarria	December 17, 1999	40306-010
On the morning he is supposed to be doing a 'survival' test, Michael wakes to find his front door open and his apartment empty. Unsure if it is a test or the result of some kind of accident, Michael is given the chance to flee into the outside world.
11	"Fire and Ice"	Vincent Misiano	Ted Humphrey	January 7, 2000	40306-011
While doing dangerous tests on Michael, Morris approaches him for help in wooing a lady colleague.
12	"Disco Inferno"	Jace Alexander	Marlane Meyer	January 14, 2000	40306-012
Michael investigates a church that is seemingly the nexus of an apparent spontaneous human combustion.
13	"I Am the Greatest"	Vincent Misiano	Michael Angeli	January 28, 2000	40306-013
Lisa starts her daunting new job in real estate; while Michael and Morris track down the first man the government experimented on: the one who got away (Charles Malik Whitfield).
14	"Film at Eleven"	Ronald L. Schwary	Debbie Sarjeant	February 11, 2000	40306-014
While out in the park on Valentine's Day, Dr. Morris is called away to meet with the President. Michael, to save a life at a bank robbery, uses his super-strength, which is caught on film by a security camera.
15	"Deep in My Heart Is a Song"	Vincent Misiano	Thomas Edward Bray	February 18, 2000	40306-015
General Irving (James Rebhorn) visits just as this time Michael slips into an apparent coma. While Dr. Morris desperately attempts to discover what is wrong, we see flashbacks to Michael before he became superhuman and a similar health scare that occurred then.
16	"Everybody Who's Anybody"	Stephen Cragg	Dan E. Fesman & Harry Victor	February 25, 2000	40306-016
Roger invites Lisa to a reception when his wife is unavailable, and General Irving makes a request of Michael which rubs him the wrong way.
17	"Boy Wonder"	Vincent Misiano	Ted Humphrey	March 10, 2000	40306-017
A mentally-challenged teenager follows Michael home after he sees him using his super-strength; Roger's investment portfolio becomes the subject of Craig Spence's envy.
18	"Lizzard's Tale"	Bob Balaban	Deborah Sarjeant	March 31, 2000	40306-018
At a medical conference, an old colleague of Morris's – trying now to recruit him into his organ-harvesting business – becomes very interested in Michael.
19	"There Are No Words"	Aaron Lipstadt	Thomas Edward Bray	April 14, 2000	40306-019
The country slowly devolves into madness after a mysterious virus which removes the words from books begins appearing in places Dr. Morris frequently visits.
20	"The Bugmeister: Part 1"	Sandy Smolan	Michael Angeli	April 21, 2000	40306-020
Roger is kicked out by his wife and comes to stay with Lisa, soon getting on her nerves; Heather befriends an insect expert with a secret; and Morris takes charge in investigating a plague of mosquitoes who seem very specific in their targets.
21	"The Bugmeister: Part 2"	Vincent Misiano	Michael Angeli	April 28, 2000	40306-021
Dr. Morris and Michael desperately attempt to thwart a series of attacks by a bug expert.
22	"The Eggman Cometh"	Ronald L. Schwary	René Echevarria	May 5, 2000	40306-022
For a brief period, Michael is without a tracking device and he is determined now more than ever to flee and take his family with him. The Eggman plots to escape from prison and get revenge on Michael. Lisa discovers more information than she expected on Dr. Morris and Michael and, determined to prove what she believes, decides to confront Dr. Morris.

== Home media ==
In 2014, CBS DVD released Now and Again: The DVD Edition on region 1 DVD in the US. The 5-disc set features all 22 episodes of the series, two featurettes and a nearly two-hour long retrospective documentary. These include interviews and full participation from almost all of the leading cast and crew, bar John Goodman. According to the packaging the "music has been changed for this home entertainment version."

In 2016, an identical set was released on region 4 DVD in Australia by Via Vision Entertainment (VVE), though it was slightly retitled Now and Again: The Complete Series.

== Reception ==
=== Ratings ===
Now and Again averaged at 6.3 million viewers, ranking at 76, with an audience share of 11, for the 1999–2000 television season.

=== Awards ===
In 2000 Now and Again won three Saturn Awards for:

- Best Genre TV Actress – Margaret Colin
- Best Genre TV Supporting Actor – Dennis Haysbert
- Best Network Television Series

Now and Again was also nominated for an Emmy in 2000 for Outstanding Main Title Design.
