= Aftertaste (disambiguation) =

Aftertaste is the taste intensity of a food or beverage that is perceived immediately after that food or beverage is removed from the mouth.

Aftertaste may also refer to:

== Music ==
- "Aftertaste", song by Ellie Goulding on the album Delirium
- "Aftertaste", song by Loud Luxury
- "Aftertaste", song by Shawn Mendes on the album Handwritten
- "Aftertaste" (Katie Gavin song), 2024 song
- Aftertaste (album), a 1997 album by Helmet

== Television ==
- Aftertaste (TV series), 2021–2022 Australian TV series
- "Aftertaste" (Holby City), a television episode
- "Aftertaste" (Medium), an episode of the 2008 American series Medium

== See also ==
- The After Taste, 2024 EP by Kenya Grace
