= The Perfect Mother =

1997 American drama film

- Written by: Karen Clark
- Directed by: Peter Levin
- Starring: Tyne Daly; Ione Skye; Louis Ferreira; Tuesday Knight; David Cubitt
- Music by: Mark Snow
- Country of origin: United States
- Original language: English

Production
- Executive producers: Orly Adelson; Roger Gimbel
- Producer: Colleen Nystedt
- Cinematography: Jan Kiesser
- Editor: Skip Schoolnik
- Running time: 92 minutes
- Production companies: Citadel Entertainment; Gimbel-Adelson Productions; New City Productions

Original release
- Network: CBS
- Release: February 18, 1997

The Perfect Mother is a 1997 American made-for-television drama film starring Tyne Daly, Ione Skye, Louis Ferreira, Tuesday Knight and David Cubitt. It was directed by Peter Levin and was first aired on CBS on February 18, 1997. The film is based on the true murder of Alexandra Ignatovic.

== Plot ==
John Podaras, son of widow Eleni Podaras, marries a woman named Kathryn. When Kathryn starts to question his mother's influence over her son, a legal battle ensues, culminating in tragedy.

== Cast ==
- Tyne Daly as Elanie Podaras
- Ione Skye as Kathryn M. Podaras
- Louis Ferreira as John Podaras
- Tuesday Knight as Charlene Podaras
- David Cubitt as Dan Podaras
