= Allison DuBois =

American psychic

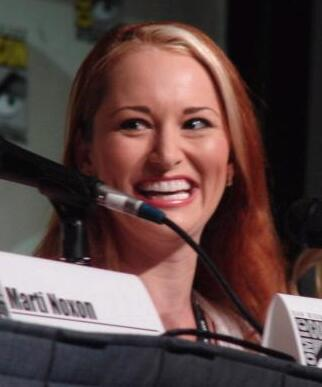
- Allison DuBois on at the 2007 San Diego Comic-Con
- Born: January 24, 1972 (age 54); Phoenix, Arizona, U.S.
- Occupations: Author; medium
- Spouse: Joe Klupar
- Children: 3
- Writing career
- Period: 2005–present
- Website: www.allisondubois.com

Allison DuBois (born January 24, 1972) is an American author and alleged medium. DuBois has used her claimed psychic abilities to assist U.S. law enforcement officials in solving crimes, forming the basis of the TV series Medium.

Her powers as a medium were tested by Gary Schwartz of the University of Arizona. Schwartz claimed that his research supports DuBois's psychic abilities, while skeptics have pointed out flaws in both DuBois's claims and Schwartz's research. She claims she has visions, of both the past and the future, but it is mainly the dreams that allegedly help the police solve crimes.

== Early life ==
DuBois was born in Phoenix, Arizona, where she attended both North High School in Phoenix and Corona del Sol High School in Tempe. Despite dropping out, she obtained her GED at the age of 16. In college, she worked as an intern at the county attorney's office in Phoenix. She received her B.A. in political science with a minor in history from Arizona State University.

== Career ==
DuBois refers to herself as a medium and profiler, rather than a psychic, because of the negative connotation she feels is associated with the term "psychic". She claims that she became aware that she had the ability to communicate with departed souls when she was six years old. DuBois claims she uses this ability to connect deceased loved ones to the living, and also to help law enforcement agencies solve crimes, such as the Texas Rangers and the Glendale, Arizona police department, and that she used these abilities as a jury consultant. These law enforcement agencies have since either denied any such cooperation happened or stated the tips provided by DuBois were not helpful.

According to TV Guide, DuBois spent four years participating in various tests at the University of Arizona to assist with their studies of mediums and psychic phenomena. Gary Schwartz, director of the VERITAS research project, claims that DuBois has psychic abilities, arguing in the March 6, 2005, TV Guide, "Anyone who's looked closely at the evidence can't help but come to the conclusion that there is something very real going on here." At their first meeting, Schwartz says DuBois accurately described a friend of Schwartz's who had just died. Impressed, Schwartz conducted a series of interviews, including one in which DuBois stated she contacted the late husband of a woman in England, knowing only the woman's name. The woman, after reading a transcript of the session, affirmed that 80% of what DuBois said was accurate. Schwartz published his research in a book titled The Truth About Medium. According to a statement by DuBois, she does not endorse the book or Schwartz.

=== Medium ===
The television drama Medium, which aired from 2005 until 2011 on NBC and CBS is based on DuBois's book, Don't Kiss Them Good-Bye. The show was created by Glenn Gordon Caron, creator of Moonlighting and other television shows, who is also one of the writers for the series. It was produced by CBS Television Studios (having acquired the TV production arm of original producer Paramount Pictures) and Grammnet, the production company owned by Cheers and Frasier alumnus Kelsey Grammer. Patricia Arquette was cast to play the role of DuBois, at the suggestion of Caron's girlfriend. DuBois stated in the January 9, 2005, TV Guide that she initially thought Arquette was too liberal to play her, remarking, "I mean, I have a gun, I have put people on death row. I wanted to make sure that was something that didn't bother her. But she assured me that she believed some people may have that coming."

"Every episode is not a biography of my life, it is simply based on my life experiences. It is an accurate portrayal of my life and the people who share it with a little Hollywood magic thrown in", DuBois has said. She does state in both her book and in the January 3, 2005, edition of Sci Fi Weekly that the program closely resembles the truth of her own life. Several details of Arquette's character match DuBois's life, such as the name of her husband on the show (Joe) and the fact that he is an aerospace engineer. Both the character and the real-life DuBois have three daughters, and the first case the character "consults" on in the show's pilot is with the Texas Rangers, the law enforcement agency with whom the real-life DuBois alleges she first worked.

== Criticism ==
Skeptics such as Paul Kurtz and Ray Hyman say that DuBois does not have psychic powers. Skeptic James Randi says that people such as DuBois give the appearance of psychic powers through cold reading techniques. For example, DuBois, when doing her first reading of Schwartz, told him that his deceased friend was telling her, "I don't walk alone", which Schwartz understood to be a reference to his friend's confinement to a wheelchair, which DuBois could not have known about. Randi says that Schwartz leapt to an unsupportable conclusion, since the notion of "not walking alone" can mean any number of things, and "certainly does not describe being in a wheelchair". Randi also asserts that experiments that allegedly yield positive results of psychic powers, such as the ones done with DuBois, are not conducted using proper scientific controls. In light of Schwartz's assertion that "some" of his experiments with DuBois were performed under such conditions, Randi questions why the rest of them were not, and points to a report demonstrating that a few of Schwartz's experiments were not performed according to standard scientific protocol. Schwartz's point-by-point response to Randi's criticisms was published in 2005.

In 2005, Randi offered to have DuBois tested for his One Million Dollar Challenge. According to Randi, DuBois declined his invitation to the challenge. In 2011, the JREF again issued the million dollar challenge to James Van Praagh, DuBois, Sylvia Browne, Carla Baron, John Edward, and others to prove their abilities in controlled experiments, commenting, "James Van Praagh and Allison DuBois have turned the huckster art of 'cold reading' into a multi-million-dollar industry, preying on families' deepest fears and regrets", he said in a statement announcing the challenge. "They should be embarrassed by the transparent performances."

Former FBI profiler, behavioral science expert and MSNBC analyst Clint Van Zandt challenges statements about psychics helping law enforcement arguing, "If psychics were truly successful and if their results were not simply the consequence of trickery (at worse [sic]) or good interviewing skills (at best), then why don't law enforcement agencies have psychic detective squads, a real X-Files Unit, or other ways to integrate these paranormal investigative capabilities?"

In a spontaneous 2010 appearance on The Real Housewives of Beverly Hills as a dinner guest of Camille Grammer, DuBois was met with criticism by cast member and actress Kyle Richards and Faye Resnick after DuBois infamously asserted that Richards' husband, Mauricio Umansky, would "never emotionally fulfill" her, and that once their children were older, they would have nothing in common. In July 2023, Richards and Umansky separated after 27 years of marriage, to which DuBois responded in an Instagram post "I guess I'm the only one who 'saw' this coming."

In February 2026, the Disappearance of Nancy Guthrie gained attention as the 84-year-old mother of NBC News journalist and Today co-anchor Savannah Guthrie appears to have been kidnapped from her home in Catalina Foothills, a suburb of Tucson, Arizona. According to scientific paranormal researcher Ben Radford, as of March 31, 2026, no psychic medium has come forward with any credible information about the disappearance. DuBois claims that she has not been approached and cannot comment as it could harm the family or the investigation. The medium claims she is too ethical to help solve the case. Professor of philosophy Massimo Pigliucci, who writes about ethics stated, "If you tell the world you possess a special ability to help locate missing persons, you cannot later treat that ability as purely elective or subject to a formal invitation process. The claim and the duty are inseparable: we don't accept this kind of selective engagement from anyone else who claims relevant expertise in an emergency - we wouldn't accept it from a doctor, a structural engineer, or a trained rescuer."

== Personal life ==
DuBois's parents, Mike Gomez and Tienna DuBois, divorced when she was young. Tienna remarried and divorced again when Allison was 12. In her first book, DuBois writes about seeing her stepdad in public with his new family. DuBois is married to Joe Klupar and they have three daughters: Aurora, Fallon, and Sophia. DuBois believes that her daughters share her psychic abilities.

== Books ==
DuBois is the author of six books dealing with mediumship.

- DuBois, Allison (2005). Don't Kiss Them Good-bye. New York: Simon & Schuster. ISBN 978-0-7432-8228-4. OCLC 58051272.
- —— (2006). We Are Their Heaven: Why the Dead Never Leave Us. New York: Simon & Schuster. ISBN 978-0-7432-9113-2. OCLC 67767350.
- —— (2007). Secrets of the Monarch: How the Dead Can Teach Us About Living a Better Life. New York: Fireside Books. ISBN 978-0-7432-9114-9. OCLC 137222773.
- —— (2011). Talk To Me—What the Dead Whisper in Your Ear. Phoenix, Arizona: STTT, Inc. ISBN 978-0-9761535-1-1. OCLC 742361932.
- —— (2015). Into the Dark: How the Dead Help Us Heal. Scottsdale, Arizona: Lucky Maven Productions, LLC. ISBN 978-09761535-3-5. OCLC 973269295.
- —— (2020). Love Can't Tell Time: Why Love Never Dies. Scottsdale, Arizona: Lucky Maven Productions, LLC. ISBN 978-0-9761535-4-2.
