= Medium (TV series) =

American television drama series

- Medium intertitle
- Genre: Supernatural drama; Thriller; Mystery; Procedural drama
- Created by: Glenn Gordon Caron
- Starring: Patricia Arquette; Miguel Sandoval; Sofia Vassilieva; Feodor Lark (Note: Credited as Maria Lark); Madison and Miranda Carabello; Jake Weber; David Cubitt
- Narrated by: Patricia Arquette
- Composers: Sean Callery; Mychael Danna; Jeff Beal
- Country of origin: United States
- Original language: English
- No. of seasons: 7
- No. of episodes: 130 (list of episodes)

Production
- Executive producers: Glenn Gordon Caron; Kelsey Grammer; Bruce Miller; René Echeverria; Steve Stark; Ronald L. Schwary
- Producer: Laurie Seidman
- Running time: 45 minutes
- Production companies: Picturemaker Productions (seasons 3–7); Grammnet Productions; Paramount Network Television (seasons 1–2); CBS Paramount Network Television (seasons 3–5); CBS Television Studios (seasons 6–7)

Original release
- Network: NBC
- Release: January 3, 2005 – June 1, 2009
- Network: CBS
- Release: September 25, 2009 – January 21, 2011

Medium is an American supernatural procedural drama series created by Glenn Gordon Caron that originally aired on NBC for five seasons from January 3, 2005, to June 1, 2009, and on CBS for two more seasons from September 25, 2009, to January 21, 2011.

The series stars Patricia Arquette as Allison DuBois, a medium employed as a consultant for the Phoenix, Arizona, district attorney's office, in fictional "Mariposa County" (Phoenix is actually in Maricopa County). Allison and her husband Joe (Jake Weber) are the parents of three daughters (Sofia Vassilieva, Feodor Lark, and Madison and Miranda Carabello), all of whom inherited Allison's gift. The show was initially based on the experiences of medium Allison DuBois, who claims she has worked with law enforcement agencies across the country in criminal investigations.

Medium was created by Glenn Gordon Caron and was produced by his company Picturemaker Productions and Kelsey Grammer's Grammnet Productions in association with Paramount Network Television from 2005 to 2006, CBS Paramount Network Television from 2006 to 2009 (after the split of Viacom and CBS Corporation), and finally CBS Television Studios from 2009 until the series ended in 2011.

On November 18, 2010, CBS announced the show's cancellation. The series finale aired on January 21, 2011.

== Episodes ==
Season	Episodes	Originally released			Rank	Rating
Season	Episodes	First released	Last released	Network	Rank	Rating
1	16	January 3, 2005	May 23, 2005	NBC	18	9.1
2	22	September 19, 2005	May 22, 2006	NBC	—N/a	—N/a
3	22	November 15, 2006	May 16, 2007	NBC	—N/a	—N/a
4	16	January 7, 2008	May 12, 2008	NBC	—N/a	—N/a
5	19	February 2, 2009	June 1, 2009	NBC	—N/a	—N/a
6	22	September 25, 2009	May 21, 2010	CBS	—N/a	—N/a
7	13	September 24, 2010	January 21, 2011	CBS	—N/a	—N/a

Allison DuBois (Patricia Arquette), a mother of three, has the gift of being able to talk to dead people, as well as foresee events and witness past events in her dreams. When she begins working for Phoenix District Attorney Manuel Devalos (Miguel Sandoval) as an intern, she has a dream related to a murder in Texas, the successful solving of which convinces Devalos and others working in the D.A.'s office – as well as herself and her husband Joe (Jake Weber) – that her gift is real.

One challenge is convincing Devalos – and other doubters in the criminal justice system – that her psychic abilities can give them the upper hand when it comes to solving crimes. Information comes to her in dreams or in cryptic visions that sometimes do not mean what they initially suggest. The other is convincing Joe that her nightmares are visions based in reality and that she's not simply neurotic.

In police investigations, Allison often accompanies Det. Lee Scanlon (David Cubitt), who initially did not believe in her gift. Allison sometimes bends the rules when she is determined to stop a crime about which she has had a vision. Additionally, Allison has helped and been helped by crochety, phlegmatic Captain Kenneth Push of the Texas Rangers (Arliss Howard), the first law-enforcement person to whom Allison revealed her gift, and, later, Cynthia Keener (Anjelica Huston) of AmeriTips, a nationwide private detective agency. In season four, it was revealed that Cynthia had a missing daughter. Allison's dreams showed that Cynthia's daughter was dead. Cynthia made a choice to kill the murderer of her daughter and go to prison. Cynthia later appeared in season five to help Allison on a case. Also during this season, it was revealed that Lynn DiNovi (Tina DiJoseph), Lee's live-in lover and an assistant to the Mayor of Phoenix, had become pregnant with Lee's child. In the season five finale, Allison discovers that she has a tumor on her brainstem. To prevent the brutal murders of her family in the future, Allison risked her life as she postponed the critical surgery fearing it would prevent her from solving the case. During her operation the tumor was successfully removed, except for a small piece deeply embedded in her brainstem, Joe is told that Allison is in a coma and may not survive.

In the sixth-season premiere episode, Allison awoke from the coma and was suffering the consequences of postponing the surgery. Allison's psychic abilities slowly begin to resurface as a form of déjà vu. At the end of the episode, Allison slowly recovers her abilities.

Since the season six premiere, eldest daughter Ariel (Sofia Vassilieva) has taken the role of nurturing her siblings, Bridgette and Marie, and is feeling overwhelmed. Ariel falls victim to a body possession by a vengeance-seeking spirit but is rescued, with her mother's help. After her surgery, Allison gets back to her normal routine working alongside Devalos and Lee, with possible side effects of her surgery affecting her dreams. Lee proposes to his girlfriend, Lynn.

As the season progresses, Ariel's transformation from a young girl into a mature woman was shown in the episode "Time Keeps on Slippin'", where she solves a crime in the future. In the season finale, Allison receives a letter from her neurologist about her brain tumor. Meanwhile, Ariel receives an acceptance letter from a university away from home. The episode begins when Joe awakens to Allison dead in their bed, having died from her tumor during the night. As the family mourns her death, Allison contacts Ariel from the other side, asking her to do one last thing for her before she passes on. However, Ariel decides to follow her own path. She turns to alcohol and leaves Phoenix without telling anyone. Suddenly, Allison awakens in her bed alive, the same morning Joe found her dead. At the end of the episode, Allison, Joe, Ariel, and Devalos and his wife Lily, are seen celebrating Lynn and Lee's wedding, toasting the engaged couples' bright futures.

In the seventh and final season, a division is created between Allison and Joe because of their desired career paths. At work, Manuel wants to run for Mayor but fears the publicity of his daughter's suicide will be used against his family; however, Lily agrees to help him campaign. Allison wishes to go back to law school because she may lose her job if Manuel is elected. Meanwhile, Joe wants to obtain an MBA, but they cannot afford for both of them to attend school. Despite Allison's wishes, Joe enrolls in school, not knowing that Allison has done the same.

In the episode "Native Tongue" Allison cannot understand anything anyone says to her, testing Joe's patience. At the end of the episode, the two reconcile, but Joe's unhappiness is still evident. Ariel leaves for college. The spirit of Lee Scanlon's deceased evil brother comes to try to entice his "baby brother" into wrongdoing. Scanlon's ensuing actions nearly end his relationship with Allison. In the episode "Blood on the Tracks", Joe's mother Marjorie is diagnosed with brain cancer.

When Joe sees his mother in the hospital, she tells him she knows nothing will happen because Allison, in season four's "Burn Baby Burn", had, to comfort the older woman, lied about Marjorie being around at her granddaughter's wedding. Marjorie accepts her fate and dies. That same night, Allison and the kids join Joe in Michigan, who is staying at his mother's home. In the early morning hours, Allison is visited by Marjorie's spirit, which warns her of upcoming "darkness" in her life. Before she can elaborate, Joe enters the room and Marjorie disappears, leaving Allison very concerned.

In the series finale, Allison receives a phone call from Joe in the midst of a plane crash that leaves no survivors. The episode cuts to seven years later, at which time Allison is an attorney building a case against a Mexican drug dealer. Allison and Marie, now a teenager, live alone. Marie cannot forgive her father for never visiting them as a ghost, something that has plagued Allison all these years. Through her dreams, Allison ostensibly sees that Joe never died, but washed up on the coast of Mexico with amnesia. A crooked cop had concealed Joe's past and was using him as an unsuspecting drug mule to transport narcotics. Against Devalos' orders, Allison strikes a deal with the drug dealer to learn Joe's location. The two are reunited, but at this point Allison wakes up in the present to see Joe's ghost. He informs her that his plane's engine failed after it departed Hawaii and that no one survived the crash. Joe sent Allison a dream of her life seven years in the future to show her that she could live an enriching, independent life.

However, Allison's love for Joe overpowered the original vision and crafted an alternate reality in which she found Joe alive. Joe's ghost leaves as Allison sobs, unable to accept her husband's death. The episode cuts to 41 years later, showcasing photos of the life that Allison has had. As Allison listens to a voice mail from her great-granddaughter, she slumps in her chair. In death, she is reunited with Joe, who has waited for her, and they kiss.

== Family ==
All of Allison's daughters appear to have inherited her gift. Ariel and Bridgette have visions or dreams, which usually occur when their mother is searching for answers to her own dreams.

In season one, Bridgette plays with a boy on her school playground who no one else sees. He is the ghost of a child who died several years earlier. Several years later she is coached to be a soccer goalie by a deceased school coach.

In the third season, Marie also begins to exhibit paranormal abilities. She has been shown viewing a premium TV channel that the family does not subscribe to, reading the mind of her optometrist to pass her eye exam, and unknowingly using paper dolls to predict the future of her father's company. In the fifth season, Marie has her first psychic dream, where she sees herself on stage with stage fright during a school play. In earlier seasons, Bridgette appears not to be bothered by her abilities, but during the fourth season she has moments of frustration when trying to understand her visions or communicate them to her parents. Ariel has a harder time coping with her developing gifts.

The second-season episode "Sweet Child O'Mine" reveals that Allison and Joe lost their first child, a boy they planned to name Brian (played by Noel Fisher). Around the anniversary of his loss each year, Allison has dreams of a life where Brian had grown up as a part of the family, though often in these dreams he dies in front of her.

Allison's younger half-brother, Michael (nicknamed "Lucky"), has the family gift, too, but does not like to acknowledge it.

Initially, Allison believed the gift had skipped a generation and her mother had had no psychic abilities. However, she later discovers that her mother had always possessed the gift but had repressed it.

== Cast and characters ==
Actor/Actress	Character	Role	Notes	Duration
Patricia Arquette	Allison DuBois	The medium	Protagonist	Season 1–7
Jake Weber	Joe DuBois	Allison's husband	Engineer	Season 1–7
Miguel Sandoval	Manuel Devalos	Allison's boss	District Attorney of Phoenix	Season 1–7
Sofia Vassilieva	Ariel DuBois	Oldest DuBois daughter	Student	Season 1–7
Feodor Lark	Bridgette DuBois	Middle DuBois daughter	Student	Season 1–7
David Cubitt	Lee Scanlon	Detective	Allison's co-worker	Season 2–7; Season 1 (recurring)
Madison and Miranda Carabello	Marie DuBois	Youngest DuBois daughter		Season 1–7 (recurring)
Tina DiJoseph	Lynn DiNovi	Mayor's liaison, later Deputy Mayor	Lee's girlfriend, later wife	Season 1–7 (recurring)
Ryan Hurst/ David Arquette	Michael "Lucky" Benoit	Allison's half-brother	Hurst in first three seasons, Arquette in seventh	Seasons 1–3 (recurring); Season 7 (recurring)
Arliss Howard	Kenneth Push	A captain in the Texas Rangers	meets Allison in the Pilot episode	Seasons 1–3 (recurring)
Holliston Coleman	Hannah	Ariel's best friend	Student	Seasons 1–6 (recurring)
Bruce Gray	Mr. Dubois	Joe's father (already deceased from season 1)	Ghost	Season 1–7 (recurring)
Kathy Baker	Mrs. Dubois	Joe's mother (deceased from season 7)	Dies from cancer in the season seven episode "Blood on the Tracks"	Seasons 1–7 (recurring)
Margo Martindale	A psychic whom Allison later depends on	A friend/mentor of Allison's	Helped Allison when she was a novice and coming to terms with her special gifts. Started in Episode 1.1	Seasons 1–4 (recurring)
Olivia Sandoval	Manny's daughter	A ghost who helps her father	Her mysterious suicide is a recurring theme. She is played by the real life daughter of Miguel Sandoval	Seasons 3 and 6 (recurring)
Kurtwood Smith	Edward Cooper	FBI agent (deceased) and serial killer	Ghost	Seasons 3–5 (recurring)
Zak Lee Guarnaccia	Julian Pierce	Killer (deceased)	Julian Pierce ambushed and exchanged fire with Edward Cooper in a hotel room.	Seasons 3–5 (recurring)
Roxanne Hart	Lily Devalos	Manuel's wife		Seasons 3–7 (recurring)
John Prosky	Tom Van Dyke	Former district attorney and Manuel's rival, later deceased	Smug and ruthless district attorney who takes over (temporarily) for Devalos. He is diagnosed with cancer and asks for Allison's help. This leads to conciliation at the end of season 4.	Seasons 3 & 4 (recurring)
Anjelica Huston	Cynthia Keener	AmeriTips investigator and Allison's employer in season 4	Arrested for the murder of her daughter's killer	Seasons 4 & 5 (recurring)
Annamarie Kenoyer	Ashley Whitaker	Ariel's friend		Seasons 5 & 6 (recurring)

== Reception ==
=== Ratings and broadcasts ===
The series premiere received 16.13 million viewers and a 6.3 rating in the 18–49 demo against CSI: Miami's 18.17 million and 6.6 rating. Medium was a consistent performer throughout its first season and landed in the Nielsen Top 20 with an average of 13.9 million viewers. The series remained in its original time slot for the second season when the network announced its Fall 2005 schedule. Throughout the season, the series experienced a decline in viewership, pulling an average of 11 million viewers. Medium was renewed for a third season in April 2006, but was missing from NBC's Fall 2006 schedule. The series was slated to return in early 2007; however, in October it was announced that production would resume immediately for a third season start-up on November 15, 2006, replacing the time slot vacated by Kidnapped. Its move to the Wednesday time slot opposite CBS' CSI: NY and ABC's Lost led to some ratings erosion, in comparison to the ratings success of the first two seasons, with year-end ratings for the third season dipping into single-digit millions of viewers. Despite the ratings decline on Wednesdays, the series was seen by the network as a reliable self-starter, building on its then lead-in Crossing Jordan. The ratings decline put the series on the bubble for renewal, but the series showed signs of life when NBC requested six additional scripts in April 2007.

Renewal for a fourth season of Medium was announced on May 7, 2007, with an undetermined premiere date and number of episodes. It was the seventh series to be renewed by the network, behind solid performers Heroes and Law & Order: Special Victims Unit. One week later, the network announced that Medium would move to the Sunday 9 p.m. time slot upon its return in January 2008. News on the series' return did not come until December 2007 when NBC announced that the fourth season would begin in January in its original Monday 10 p.m. time slot, despite the WGA Strike of 2007, which forced the show to cease production, allowing for only nine segments/episodes to be filmed. Scheduling returning mid-season shows in timeslots where they were previously successful was a pattern for NBC during the strike: Law & Order returned to Wednesdays at 10 and The Apprentice was back on Thursdays at 9:00 p.m.

With the ratings improvement Medium demonstrated in its fourth season after returning to Mondays, it was one of the first series to be renewed in an early announcement in April 2008 from NBC regarding its 2008–09 season. Similar to the previous season, Medium was initially scheduled to move to the Sunday night line-up; however, a December 2008 press release revealed that the fifth season would air in the series' original Monday night 10 p.m. time slot.

After some ratings erosion during its fifth season, NBC renewed Medium for an abridged sixth season in early May 2009. However, within a week negotiations stalled over episode count and subsequently NBC decided not to renew the series despite the fact that it outperformed some of the network's renewed shows. Within 24 hours of NBC's cancellation, CBS, whose production arm produces the series, renewed the show for a full, 22-episode, sixth season, placing it in the Friday at 9:00 p.m. slot between fellow CBS in-house productions Ghost Whisperer (which had a similar theme to Medium) and Numb3rs. CBS first aired this series with a rerun episode on July 21, 2009. The sixth season premiered on Friday, September 25, 2009 at 9pm. Throughout its sixth season, Medium and its lead-in Ghost Whisperer won their respective time slots on most Fridays, and each show took turns being the most-watched show of the night. As the season drew to a close, Ghost Whisperer was considered a definite renewal, whereas Medium was once again on the bubble for renewal. However, in a dramatic move from CBS, the network announced on May 18, 2010, that Medium was renewed for a seventh season, while seven other series, including Ghost Whisperer, were canceled by the network. TVbytheNumbers.com speculated that the decision was made because Medium is fully owned by CBS, while Ghost Whisperer was split between CBS and ABC. Upon its return in September 2010, Medium took over the Friday 8 p.m. slot vacated by Ghost Whisperer.

=== Cancellation ===
On October 26, 2010, CBS ordered the seventh and final season cut from 22 to 13 episodes. On November 15, 2010, Patricia Arquette told Entertainment Weekly that the show "got canceled" and had only two more episodes to shoot. She also said the writers were excited that they would be able to end the show properly. On November 18, 2010, series creator Glenn Gordon Caron posted to both the Medium Facebook page and the CBS forums, stating that the show had been canceled and that the series finale would be broadcast on January 21, 2011. CBS confirmed the cancellation with a press release on December 21, 2010, which also confirmed the series finale date of January 21.

=== Seasonal ratings/broadcast history ===
Seasonal rankings (based on average total viewers per episode) of Medium.

Each U.S. network television season generally starts in late September and ends in late May (except for the fifth season), which coincides with the completion of May sweeps. Times mentioned in this section are in Eastern Time.

Season	Network	Time slot	Season premiere	Season finale	Episode count	TV season	Season rank	Viewers (in millions)
1	NBC	Monday 10:00 pm	January 3, 2005	May 23, 2005	16	2004–2005	#19	13.9
2	NBC	Monday 10:00 pm	September 19, 2005	May 22, 2006	22	2005–2006	#31	11.2
3	NBC	Wednesday 10:00 pm	November 15, 2006	May 16, 2007	22	2006–2007	#51	8.3
4	NBC	Monday 10:00 pm	January 7, 2008	May 12, 2008	16	2007–2008	#41	10.47
5	NBC	Monday 10:00 pm	February 2, 2009	June 1, 2009	19	2008–2009	#61	8.45
6	CBS	Friday 9:00 pm	September 25, 2009	May 21, 2010	22	2009–2010	#53	7.79
7	CBS	Friday 8:00 pm	September 24, 2010	January 21, 2011	13	2010–2011	#57	7.8

== Awards and nominations ==
Awards and nominations for Medium
Year	Group	Award	Result	Recipient(s)
2005	BMI Film & TV Awards	BMI TV Music Award	Won	Mychael Danna, Jeff Beal
2005	Emmy Award	Outstanding Lead Actress in a Drama Series	Won	Patricia Arquette
2005	Imagen Foundation Awards	Best Actor – Television	Nominated	Miguel Sandoval
2005	Satellite Award	Outstanding Actress in a Series, Drama	Nominated	Patricia Arquette
2005	Satellite Award	Outstanding Actor in a Series, Drama	Nominated	Jake Weber
2006	ASCAP Film and Television Music Awards	ASCAP Award – Top TV Series	Won	Sean Callery
2006	Academy of Science Fiction, Fantasy & Horror Films	Saturn Award – Best Actress in a Television Program	Nominated	Patricia Arquette
2006	Golden Globe Award	Best Actress in a Television Series – Drama	Nominated	Patricia Arquette
2006	Motion Picture Sound Editors	Golden Reel Award – Best Sound Editing in Television Short Form – Music	Won	Robert Cotnoir (music editor) For "The Song Remains the Same"
2006	Screen Actors Guild	Outstanding Performance by a Female Actor in a Drama Series	Nominated	Patricia Arquette
2006	Young Artist Awards	Best Performance in a TV Series (Drama) – Supporting Young Actress	Won	Sofia Vassilieva
2006	Young Artist Awards	Best Performance in a TV Series (Comedy or Drama) – Young Actress Age Ten or Younger	Nominated	Feodor Lark
2007	ALMA Awards	Outstanding Supporting Actor – Television Series, Mini-Series or Television Movie	Nominated	Miguel Sandoval
2007	Academy of Science Fiction, Fantasy & Horror Films	Saturn Award – Best Actress in a Television Program	Nominated	Patricia Arquette
2007	Emmy Award	Outstanding Lead Actress in a Drama Series	Nominated	Patricia Arquette
2007	Golden Globe Award	Best Actress in a Television Series – Drama	Nominated	Patricia Arquette
2007	Screen Actors Guild	Outstanding Performance by a Female Actor in a Drama Series	Nominated	Patricia Arquette
2007	Young Artist Awards	Best Performance in a TV Series (Comedy or Drama) – Young Actress Age Ten or Younger	Won	Feodor Lark
2008	BMI Film & TV Awards	BMI TV Music Award	Won	Mychael Danna
2008	Golden Globe Award	Best Actress in a Television Series – Drama	Nominated	Patricia Arquette
2008	Emmy Award	Outstanding Guest Actress in a Drama Series	Nominated	Anjelica Huston
2008	TV Land Awards	Favorite Character From the Other Side	Nominated	Patricia Arquette
2010	Screen Actors Guild	Outstanding Performance by a Female Actor in a Drama Series	Nominated	Patricia Arquette

== Home media ==
CBS DVD (distributed by Paramount) has released all seven seasons of Medium on DVD in Regions 1, 2 & 4.

Season	Ep #	Discs	DVD Release dates			Bonus material (Region 1)
Season	Ep #	Discs	Region 1	Region 2	Region 4	Bonus material (Region 1)
1	16	5	June 13, 2006	August 14, 2006	September 7, 2006	Extended version of the "Pilot", cast and crew commentaries on select episodes, deleted scenes on select episodes, The Making of Medium, The Story of Medium, Interpreting Allison DeBois, gag reel, TV spots.
2	22	6	October 3, 2006	July 9, 2007	June 6, 2007	Deleted scenes, cast and crew commentaries on select episodes, The Story of Medium Season 2, Medium in Another Dimension, A Day in the Life of the Dubois Daughters, The Museum of Television & Radio Q&A with Cast and Creative Team, gag reel.
3	22	6	October 16, 2007	July 7, 2008	July 9, 2008	Cast and crew commentaries on select episodes, Drawing on Dreams, Directing with David Arquette, Acting Is My "Racquet", The Story of Medium Season 3, gag reel, The Making of Medium Season 3.
4	16	4	September 9, 2008	June 15, 2009	June 3, 2009	Deleted scenes with commentary by Glenn Gordon Caron and Larry Teng, "Joe's Crayon Dream", "Introducing Cynthia Keener", "The Making of Medium Season 4", Gag reel
5	19	5	October 6, 2009	August 30, 2010	July 1, 2010	Script to Screen "Apocalypse...Now?", Curious Maria, The Making of Medium Season 5, Jake & Patricia Q & A
6	22	6	October 5, 2010	July 25, 2011	July 21, 2011	The Mind Behind Medium, The 100th Episode of Medium: A Celebration, Zombies on the Loose: The Making of 'Bite Me', The Music of Medium, Non-Fat Double Medium
7	13	4	June 21, 2011	July 16, 2012	July 18, 2012	The Making of Medium: Season 7, Memories of Medium, Medium: Shadows and Light, Meet Detective Lee Scanlon, Medium Around the World, Bloopers/Gag reel
1–7	130	35	May 5, 2020	—N/a		

== See also ==
- List of ghost films
