= Tina DiJoseph =

American actress

- Born: January 20, 1968 (age 57)
- Occupation: Actress
- Spouse: Glenn Gordon Caron (m. 2006)

Tina DiJoseph (born January 20, 1968) is an actress, best known for her appearances on the television show Medium.

She was first seen in the first season when she played a Texas Ranger under Captain Push. She appears later as a recurring character, the Mayor's liaison/Deputy Mayor, Lynn DiNovi, whose character enters into a relationship with Detective Lee Scanlon (David Cubitt). The two have a child and later marry.

== Personal life ==
In the fall of 2006, DiJoseph married television writer/producer Glenn Gordon Caron.
