= Moira Kirland =

American television writer and producer

- Occupations: Television writer, television producer
- Writing career
- Notable works: Dark Angel, The Dead Zone, Castle, Arrow

Moira Kirland is an American television writer and producer, whose credits include Dark Angel, The Dead Zone, Castle, and Madam Secretary. She is currently serving as a writer on Quantum Leap.

== Career ==
Kirland began her career in 1992 working as an assistant to the producers of the animated series Capitol Critters and as a producer in 1993 on the independent film Saint Crispen's Day. Between 2000-2005 she worked as writer/producer on Dark Angel, Haunted, The Twilight Zone and The Dead Zone before returning to network television with Medium, where she worked from the first season until the fifth season in 2009. She has since worked on Castle and Arrow.

Kirkland was the creator and showrunner of The InBetween (2018) on NBC-TV.″

== Episodes written ==
- The Rookie (2025)
  - "The Gala" (7.06)
- Quantum Leap (2022)
  - "A Decent Proposal" (1.04)
- The Endgame (2022)
  - "Gold Rush" (1.05)
  - "Happily Ever After" (1.10)
- Lincoln Rhyme: Hunt for the Bone Collector (2020)
  - "Russian Roulette" (1.03)
- The InBetween (2019), creator/showrunner
  - "Pilot" (1.01)
  - "The Length of a River" (1.06)
  - "Monsters and Angels" (1.10)
- Madam Secretary (2015–2018)
  - "The Long Shot" (2.05)
  - "Invasive Species" (2.13)
  - "Ghost Detainee" (2.20)
  - "The French Revolution" (3.05)
  - "Labor of Love" (3.14)
  - "Global Relief" (3.19)
  - "Loophole" (4.06)
  - "Reading the Signs" (4.13)
  - "Thin Ice" (4.19)
- Hawaii Five-0 (2013–2015)
  - "Kupu'eu" (4.05)
  - "Hau'oli La Ho'omoaika'i" (4.09)
  - "Pale 'la" (4.15)
  - "Ka Hana Malu" (5.08)
  - "Ike Hanau" (5.20)
- Arrow (2012)
  - "An Innocent Man" (1.04) (with Lana Cho)
  - "Legacies" (1.06) (with Marc Guggenheim)
- Castle (2009–2012)
  - "Ghosts" (1.08)
  - "Inventing the Girl" (2.03)
  - "Tick, Tick, Tick..." (2.16)
  - "He's Dead, She's Dead" (3.02)
  - "The Final Nail" (3.15)
  - "Kick the Ballistics" (4.04)
  - "A Dance with Death" (4.18)
- Medium (2005–2007)
  - "Coming Soon" (1.06)
  - "Coded" (1.09)
  - "Penny for Your Thoughts" (1.15)
  - "Sweet Dreams" (2.05)
  - "The Reckoning" (2.10)
  - "Sweet Child O' Mine" (2.15)
  - "Ghost in the Machine" (3.05)
  - "Mother's Little Helper" (3.07)
  - "The Boy Next Door" (3.15)
  - "Head Games" (3.20) (with Javier Grillo-Marxuach and Robert Doherty)
  - "Girls Ain't Nothing but Trouble" (4.05)
  - "Drowned World" (4.16)
  - "A Taste of Her Own Medicine" (5.05)
- The Dead Zone (2004)
  - "No Questions Asked" (3.06)
  - "Speak Now" (3.08)
- The Twilight Zone (2002 TV series) (2003)
  - "Into the Light" (1.29)
  - "Developing" (1.39)
- Haunted (2002 TV series) (2002)
  - "Abby" (1.04)
  - "Last Call" (1.09)
- Dark Angel (2000–2002)
  - "Blah Blah Woof Woof" (1.09)
  - "Rising" (1.13) (with Jose Molina, David Zabel, Doris Egan)
  - "Hit a Sisa Back" (1.20)
  - "Designate This" (2.01)
  - "Boo" (2.05) (with Charles H. Eglee)
  - "The Berrisford Agenda" (2.11)
  - "Exposure" (2.16)
  - "Love Among the Runes" (2.20) (with Jose Molina)
