= Vincent Misiano =

American television director

Vincent Misiano is an American television director.

He has directed episodes of 45 different series, including Chicago PD, Agents of S.H.I.E.L.D., The Blacklist, The West Wing, Prison Break, Medium and Third Watch. He was elected to three terms as National Vice-president of the Directors Guild of America.

== Career ==
Misiano began his directing career working in advertising . His first episodic directing assignment came with a 1995 episode of Law and Order. Two more episodes of L&O led to two episodes of Ally McBeal in 1998. He became a regular director for the short-lived CBS drama Now and Again, directing seven first-season episodes over 1999 and 2000. He directed a first-season episode of That's Life in 2000. Later in 2000 he directed two episodes of Level 9.

In 2001 he directed an episode of the X-Files spin-off The Lone Gunmen. 2002 saw a significant increase in demand for his work. He directed single episodes of The Education of Max Bickford, MDs, and Ed. He also began a working relationship with ongoing series The West Wing and Third Watch. He directed a third-season episode of The West Wing and returned in fall 2002 for a fourth season episode. Similarly, he directed a third-season episode of Third Watch and returned for a further fourth season episode.

Misiano continued his work on the fourth season of The West Wing into 2003 with a further episode. In fall 2003 he directed a fifth-season episode of Third Watch and an episode of Judging Amy. In 2004 Misiano directed a fourth episode of The West Wing episode-7, "Change is Gonna Come," this time for the shows sixth season. He also directed an episode of Hack. 2005 saw the end of Third Watch with its sixth season, Misiano directed his fourth episode of the show before it ended. Misiano became a regular director for Medium later in 2005. He directed two episodes of the first season and then returned in the fall to direct an episode of the second season. He also directed three second-season episodes of The 4400. He worked on another political drama, Commander in Chief, and directed two episodes.

In 2006 Misiano directed the third-season premiere of The 4400. He directed two episodes of short-lived legal drama Conviction, and single episodes of both Killer Instinct and Dr. Vegas. In fall 2006 he became involved with the second season of Fox action series Prison Break. He directed one second-season episode in 2006 and another in 2007. He also directed a late third-season episode of Medium in Spring 2007. In fall 2007 he directed a third-season episode of Prison Break.

In Spring 2008 Misiano directed a first-season episode of Eli Stone and three fourth season episodes of Medium. In fall 2008 Misiano returned to Eli Stone to direct a second-season episode. He directed another second-season episode in 2009 before the show's cancellation. He continued to direct for Medium, directing a fifth season episode in 2009.

In 2014, he directed episodes of the premiere of the second season and the first part of the two-parter season finale of Agents of S.H.I.E.L.D., ABC's Resurrection, Agent Carter and three episodes of The Mysteries of Laura.
