= David Cubitt =

British actor

- Born: 18 March 1965 (age 61); England
- Occupation: Actor
- Years active: 1987–present
- Spouse: Karolina Turek

David Cubitt (born 18 March 1965) is a British actor.

Born in England in 1965 to a Dutch mother, Jette, and an English father, David, he moved with his parents to Vancouver, British Columbia when he was six months old. He studied at Studio 58 there. He has starred in the Canadian series Traders and the American series Robbery Homicide Division.

He appeared as Det. Lee Scanlon in the series Medium. He first appeared in season 1 and appeared until the show was cancelled after its seventh season. He appeared in the disaster miniseries 10.5 and 10.5: Apocalypse, and made his film debut in Alive: The Miracle of the Andes (1993), co-starring Ethan Hawke.

== Filmography ==
=== Film ===
Year	Title	Role	Notes
1991	Run	College Buddy	
1991	K2	Peter	
1993	Alive	Adolfo "Fito" Strauch	
1994	August Winds	Henry Steiner	Short film
1995	I Shot a Man in Vegas	Johnny	
1996	Swann	Brownie	
2000	The Perfect Son	Theo	
2001	Ali	Robert Lipsyte	
2013	No Clue	Horn	
2014	Bad City	Dominic Kincaid	
2014	Seventh Son	Rogue Knight	
2015	The Colossal Failure of the Modern Relationship	Richard Avery	Also executive producer
2015	Stonewall	Coach Winters	
2015	Rehearsal	Clive	
2016	Victory Square	Louie	Short film
2016	Shut In	Doug	
2017	Black Chicks	Guy	Short film
2017	Juggernaut	Dean Gamble	
2019	American Woman	Agent John Spivey	
2023	The Wall Street Boy (Kipkemboi)	Colin Bentley	

=== Television ===
Year	Title	Role	Notes
1987	21 Jump Street	Willie	Episode: "Honor Bound"
1990	Booker	Dave	Episode: "Reunion"
1991	Silent Motive	Doug	Television film
1991	Palace Guard	Mike	Episode: "Eye of Newt"
1992	A Killer Among Friends	Greg Monroe	Television film
1993–94	E.N.G.	Bruce Foreman	Main cast (season 5; recurring, season 4; 18 episodes)
1994–95	Lonesome Dove: The Series	Robert Shelby	5 episodes
1995	TekWar	Tom Weston	Episode: "Promises to Keep"
1995	The X-Files	Captain Barclay	Episode: "Død Kalm"
1995, 1998, 2001	The Outer Limits	Kevin Stein / Curtis Grainger / Colonel Faber	3 episodes
1996–98	Traders	Jack Larkin	Main cast (seasons 1–4; 52 episodes)
1996	Poltergeist: The Legacy	Kyle Vance	Episode: "The Tenement"
1997	Keeping the Promise	Boat Agent	Television film
1997	F/X: The Series	Eddie Nigel	Episode: "Double Image"
1997	The Perfect Mother	Dan Podaras	Television film
1997–98	Michael Hayes	Danny Hayes	Main cast
1997	Major Crime	Ricky Widmer	Television film
1999	Turks	Mike Turk	Main cast
1999	To Love, Honor & Betray	Charlie	Television film
2001	That's Life	J.T. Gold	3 episodes
2002	The American Embassy	Doug Roach	3 episodes
2002–03	Robbery Homicide Division	Det. Richard Barstow	Main cast
2003	E.D.N.Y.	Jimmy Erlick	Pilot
2003	Finding John Christmas	Noah Greeley	Television film
2004	10.5	Dr. Jordan Fisher	miniseries
2005	Bounty Hunters	Colin	Television film
2005–11	Medium	Detective Lee Scanlon	Main role (season 2–7, recurring: season 1; 111 episodes)
2005	The Eleventh Hour	Aaron Tiido	Episode: "The Miracle Worker"
2005	Murder at the Presidio	Private Arch Dwyer	Television film; uncredited
2005	Rapid Fire	George Smith	Television film
2006	10.5: Apocalypse	Dr. Jordan Fisher	miniseries
2010	Bond of Silence	Bob McIntosh	Television film
2011	Possessing Piper Rose	Ben Maxwell	Television film
2011	Snowmageddon	John Miller	Television film
2012	Taken Back: Finding Haley	Dave	Television film
2013	Dangerous Intuition	Dan Beckman	Television film
2014	Arrow	Mark Shaw	Episode: "Corto Maltese"
2013, 2016	Bates Motel	Sam Bates	4 episodes
2015	Ray Donovan	Zack Davis	2 episodes
2016, 2018	Van Helsing	John	Main cast (season 1; guest, season 3; 9 episodes)
2017	Once Upon a Time	Robert	Episode: "Murder Most Foul"
2017	Real Detective	Detective Rocky Harris	Episode: "Lambs to the Slaughter"
2017	Supernatural	Barthamus	Episode: "The Scorpion and the Frog"
2018	The Detail	Detective Kyle Price	Main cast
2018–2020	Siren	Ted Pownall	Recurring cast (36 episodes)
2018	Travelers	FBI Director Stevenson	2 episodes
2019	BH90210	Phil	4 episodes
2019–2023	Virgin River	Calvin	Recurring cast (16 episodes)
2020	Altered Carbon	Dugan	3 episodes
2020	The Good Doctor	Owen Gottfried	Episode: "Fixation"
2021	Nancy Drew	Councilman Fraser	Episode: "The Siege of the Unknown Specter"
2024	Allegiance	Superintendent Eli Bolton	18 episodes
2025	Family Law	Lawyer	season 4

== Awards ==
Year	Award	Category	Film	Result
1997	Gemini Award	Best Performance by an Actor in a Continuing Leading Dramatic Role	Traders	Won
1998	Gemini Award	Best Performance by an Actor in a Leading Role in a Dramatic Program or Mini-Series	Major Crime	Nominated
2001	Genie Award	Best Performance by an Actor in a Leading Role	The Perfect Son	Nominated
2005	Gemini Award	Best Performance by an Actor in a Guest Role Dramatic Series	The Eleventh Hour	Nominated
