= Glenn Gordon Caron =

American television director, producer and writer (born 1954)

Glenn Gordon Caron (born April 3, 1954), sometimes credited as Glenn Caron, is an American writer, director, and producer, best known for the television series Moonlighting in the 1980s and Medium in the 2000s. He lives in Los Angeles, California.

== Biography ==
Caron was born to a Jewish family in Oceanside, New York. After graduating from the State University of New York at Geneseo in 1975, Caron studied with Del Close and The Second City in Chicago before working at an advertising agency.

While at the ad agency he was invited by NBC to write a pilot for the network. The pilot did not receive a series order, but Caron's work impressed writer-producer James L. Brooks, who invited him to join the writing staff of Taxi, although he only worked on one episode.

Caron subsequently coproduced the first 12 episodes of Remington Steele (NBC, 1982-'87) before leaving to form his own company, Picturemaker Productions. Caron created Moonlighting (ABC, 1985-'89), a worldwide hit that revitalized the career of Cybill Shepherd and launched the career of Bruce Willis. Between its third and fourth seasons, Caron directed his first feature film, Clean and Sober (1988), starring Michael Keaton. He was fired by ABC from Moonlighting before the start of its fifth (and final) season, reportedly because Shepherd demanded it. Caron then directed three more feature films — Wilder Napalm (1993), starring Dennis Quaid and Debra Winger, and written by Vince Gilligan, who later created the AMC series Breaking Bad; the Warren Beatty-Annette Bening vehicle Love Affair (1994), a remake of the 1939 film of the same name; and Picture Perfect (1997), starring Jennifer Aniston — before returning to television in 1999 as the creator of the short-lived series Now and Again (CBS, 1999-2000).

In 2001 Fox ordered 13 episodes of the Caron-created romantic comedy Fling. Seven episodes were shot, but the network became unhappy with the direction of the series during production and canceled it before any of those episodes could be broadcast. Four years later Caron created Medium for NBC. He also served as executive producer of the show, wrote several episodes and directed the series's pilot episode. It ran for seven seasons, with the last two airing on CBS.

In 2008 Caron wrote a pilot for CBS titled The Meant to Be's, about a woman who dies only to find herself sent back to Earth to help people get their life back on track. However, it wasn't given a series order.

In 2013 Caron wrote a pilot for a proposed Fox series titled The Middle Man. Set in the 1960s, a Boston FBI agent and his Irish-American informant take on the Italian-American mafia. Ben Affleck was attached to direct the pilot episode, but it was never filmed. The following year Fox ordered a pilot for The Cure, a medical drama to be cowritten and coproduced by Caron and Canadian journalist Malcolm Gladwell, but it too was never filmed. Caron was also attached to write a pilot for ITV Studios in 2016 based on Alan Glynn's novel Paradime.

Caron wrote and produced episodes of the first and second seasons of the FX series Tyrant, and in the spring of 2017 he joined CBS's Bull as a consulting producer before becoming the series's showrunner at the beginning of season two. In May 2021, it was announced that Caron would be departing Bull, as well as ending his deal with CBS Studios.

== Awards ==
Caron received the 2007 Outstanding Television Writer Award at the Austin Film Festival. He also won a Writers Guild of America award for his 1985 pilot script for Moonlighting and was nominated for four Primetime Emmy Awards for Moonlighting between 1986 and 1987.

== Personal life ==
Caron has been married to his second wife, Tina DiJoseph, since 2006; they have one child. Caron has three children from his first marriage. He is the founder-owner of Picturemaker Productions.

== Sexual harassment controversy ==
On December 19, 2018, The Boston Globe published an op-ed by actress Eliza Dushku in which she claimed she was fired by Caron from the CBS series Bull in 2017 after she confronted its star, Michael Weatherly, about sexually charged remarks he had made to her while filming the final three episodes of the show's first season. Caron had been hired as a consulting producer for those three episodes, prior to becoming Bull's showrunner and an executive producer for season two. Dushku had been expected to join the series full-time in season two. CBS paid her $9.5 million to settle her claims of wrongful dismissal and sexual harassment. Dushku signed a nondisclosure agreement as part of her settlement, but after news of the settlement leaked and Weatherly and Caron gave statements to The New York Times — "The idea that our not exercising her option to join the series was in any way punitive just couldn't be further from the truth," said Caron — Dushku said she felt compelled to respond, writing, "The narrative propagated by CBS, actor Michael Weatherly, and writer-producer Glenn Gordon Caron is deceptive and in no way fits with how they treated me on the set of the television show Bull and retaliated against me for simply asking to do my job without relentless sexual harassment." Prior to his exit from Bull in 2021, CBS launched an investigation regarding the departures of multiple writers from the show and whether or not Caron allegedly "fostered a disrespectful work environment during his four-year tenure."

== Filmography ==
=== Television ===
Year	Title	Director	Writer	Creator	Executive Producer	Notes
1979	Taxi	No	Yes	No	No	Episode "The Great Race"
1980	Good Time Harry	No	Yes	No	No	Episode "Harry Kisses Death on the Mouth"
1980–1981	Breaking Away	No	Yes	No	No	Episodes "Knowing Her", "Grand Illusion" and "La Strada"; Also supervisor producer
1982	Fame	No	Yes	No	No	Episode "Alone in a Crowd"
1982–1983	Remington Steele	No	Yes	No	No	4 episodes; Also supervisor producer
1985–1988	Moonlighting	No	Yes	Yes	Yes	Wrote 7 episodes; Writers Guild of America Award for Episodic Comedy; Nominated- Primetime Emmy Award for Outstanding Writing
1999–2000	Now and Again	Yes	Yes	Yes	Yes	Directed episode "Origins"; Wrote episodes "Origins", "On the Town" and "Over Easy"
2001	Fling	Yes	Yes	No	Yes	Unaired
2008	The Meant to Be's	No	Yes	No	Yes	Unaired pilot
2005–2011	Medium	Yes	Yes	Yes	Yes	Directed "Pilot"; Wrote 10 episodes
2014–2015	Tyrant	No	Yes	No	Yes	4 episodes
2017–2021	Bull	Yes	Yes	No	Yes	Directed 4 episodes; Wrote 11 episodes; Also consulting producer on 3 episodes

TV movies

Year	Title	Writer	Executive Producer	Notes
1984	Concrete Beat	Yes	Yes	Unsold pilot
1986	Long Time Gone	Yes	Yes	Unsold pilot

=== Film ===
Short film

Year	Title	Director	Writer	Note
1989	The Making of Me	Yes	Yes	Created for Disney World's Epcot Center

Feature film

Year	Title	Director	Writer
1988	Clean and Sober	Yes	No
1993	Wilder Napalm	Yes	No
1994	Love Affair	Yes	No
1997	Picture Perfect	Yes	Yes
