= Glenda Spooner =

Glenda Spooner (1897–1981), née Graham, was a British journalist and author writing about horses. She was the founder, chairman and organising secretary of the Ponies of Britain Club. She was well known as a pony breeder and for her involvement with pony and horse welfare. She established the Glenda Spooner Horse rescue farm, which was later taken over by the International League for the Protection of Horses (ILPH) renamed in 2008 as World Horse Welfare.

== Family ==
Glenda Victoria Maud Graham was born in Poona, India on 5 August 1897. She was the daughter of Sir John Frederick Noble Graham, 2nd Bt (Graham baronets of Larbert House and Househill (1906)) and Irene Maud Campbell and sister of Sir (John) Reginald Graham 3rd Bt, VC, OBE. She married, on 8 June 1934, to Captain Hugh "Tony" Spooner late of the 19th King George’s Own Lancers, son of Major W B Spooner, Army Veterinary Corp, and lived with him in Egypt. Captain Hugh "Tony" Spooner, Superintendent of Flying Operations and Chief Pilot to the Misr-Airwork Company of Egypt was killed in a flying accident in a sandstorm in Egypt on 15 March 1935. He was the brother of Winifred Spooner, Aviator (died 1933). Glenda Spooner adopted her husband’s niece Vivien McIrvine (née Spooner).

== Career ==
Spooner had a varied career including going on stage with the Graham Moffat Company just after World War I; working as an advertising representative for Great Eight and then as advertising manager and director of Popular Flying. She also operated horse dealing businesses, latterly in the New Forest. Spooner wrote not only technical books about horses and riding but also novels featuring horses as the main characters. Her technical books include Instructions on Ponymastership (1955), Pony Trekking, (1961) and The Handbook of Showing (1968). Her novels include the Royal Crusader (1948), The Earth Sings (1950), The Perfect Pest (1951) and Silk Purse (1963). Her novel, Victoria Glencairn, is said to be semi-autobiographical.

== Horse welfare ==
While in Egypt, Spooner became involved with the Old War Horse Memorial Hospital founded in 1934 in Cairo by Dorothy Brooke and later renamed the Brooke Hospital for Animals. She edited Dorothy Brooke’s diaries.

In 1953 Glenda Spooner, with Miss Gladys Yule, started the Ponies of Britain Club, of which she was the Chairman and Organising Secretary. She started a horse rescue farm which was based near Hoarwithy, Ross on Wye which was later incorporated into the ILPH with which she was also involved. After she was no longer running the farm, it was taken over by her niece Vivien McIrvine until it amalgamated with ILPH in 1996, Vivien also became a Vice President of the ILPH now World Horse Welfare. World Horse Welfare still name their Somerset Farm "Glenda Spooner Farm".
