= The Simpsons and Their Mathematical Secrets =

2013 book by Simon Singh

- First edition
- Author: Simon Singh
- Language: English
- Genre: Non-fiction
- Publisher: Bloomsbury
- Publication date: 2013

The Simpsons and Their Mathematical Secrets is a 2013 book by Simon Singh, which is based on the premise that "many of the writers of The Simpsons are deeply in love with numbers, and their ultimate desire is to drip-feed morsels of mathematics into the subconscious minds of viewers".

The book compiles all the mathematical references used throughout the show's run, and analyzes them in detail. Rather than just explaining the mathematical concepts in the context of how they relate to the relevant episodes of The Simpsons, as well as the closely related show Futurama, Singh "uses them as a starting point for lively discussions of mathematical topics, anecdotes and history". Topics covered include Fermat's Last Theorem, which Singh has written a popular book about, and Euler's identity. A chapter is dedicated to the "Homer^{3}" segment from Treehouse of Horror VI, in which Homer finds himself in the third dimension (rendered with then-cutting edge computer graphics). Singh points out many mathematical references in the segment, such as the cosmological equation (ρ_{m0} > 3H_{0}^{2}/8πG) which describes the density of the universe and foreshadows the end of the segment. Singh discusses several equations that Homer writes on a chalkboard in "The Wizard of Evergreen Terrace", including one that predicts the mass of the Higgs boson: “If you work it out, you get the mass of a Higgs boson that’s only a bit larger than the nano-mass of a Higgs boson actually is. It’s kind of amazing as Homer makes this prediction 14 years before it was discovered.”

== Critical reception ==
The Guardian described it as a "readable and unthreatening introduction to various mathematical concepts". The New York Times described it as "highly entertaining". The book was well-received by The Simpsons staff; Simpsons writer and Futurama co-creator David X. Cohen said "Simon Singh's excellent book blows the lid off a decades-long conspiracy to educate cartoon viewers." Mike Reiss compared it favorably to the works of Martin Gardner.
