= Wellington School, Somerset =

Public school in Somerset, England

Wellington School

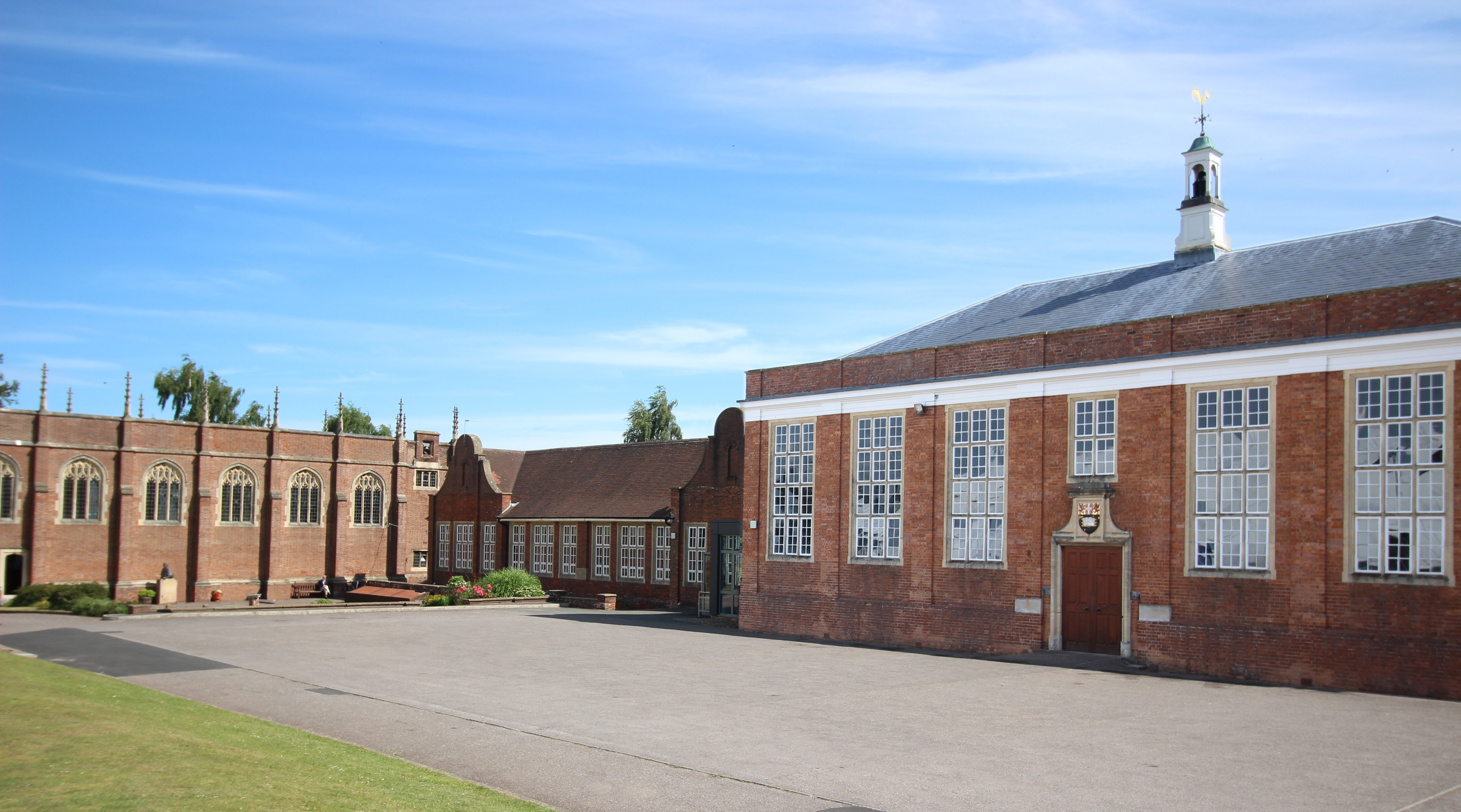
- Wellington School's Great Hall and Memorial Chapel

Location
- Wellington, Somerset, TA21 8NT; England; 50.9755°N 3.2254°W

Information
- Type: Private school; Public school; Day school; Boarding school
- Motto: Latin: Nisi Dominus Frustra (If God Be Not With Us, Our Labour is in Vain)
- Religious affiliation: Church of England
- Established: 1837; 189 years ago
- Founder: Benjamin Frost
- Department for Education URN: 123930 Tables
- Headmaster: Alex Battison
- Gender: Mixed
- Age: 3 to 18
- Enrolment: 805 (2021)
- Colours: Navy & Light Blue
- Alumni: Old Wellingtonians
- Website: www.wellington-school.org.uk
- "Wellington School, registered charity no. 1161447". Charity Commission for England and Wales.

Wellington School is a co-educational private school in the English public school tradition with boarding school and day school provision for pupils aged 3–18 located in Wellington, Somerset, England. Wellington School was founded in 1837.

Wellington School is a registered charity and has around 800 pupils currently in attendance. Around 150 of those pupils are boarders. The school is a member of the Headmasters' and Headmistresses' Conference. Wellington School operates its own feeder preparatory school, Wellington Prep School, which shares the main campus.

== History ==
Wellington School is situated to the south of the centre of the small town of Wellington. It was founded originally as Wellington Academy in 1837 as an all-boys school by Benjamin Frost (Headmaster 1837–1848). It was later purchased and run by Frost's wife and William Corner (Headmaster 1848–1879). In 1879 under new headmaster Francis Raban renamed the school West Somerset County School, although only 34 years later the school was again renamed but this time as Wellington School, the name it retains today.

The school was originally founded as a private boys' school, but in the early 1970s girls were first accepted into the Sixth Form. From 1979 girls were accepted from the age of 10.

The school opened a new junior school in 2000, having previously only catered for pupils aged 10 and over. This was renamed "Wellington Prep School" in 2015.

In 2003 the Princess Royal opened the Princess Royal Sports Complex, a £2.65 million indoor sports facility. The Princess Royal Sports Complex was offered to competitors in the 2012 London Olympics for training.

The Good Schools Guide described Wellington School as "Friendly, purposeful and busy, it is a solid, well-managed school, neat but not glossy, giving its pupils a sound education and masses of high points in developmental experience." The Guide also described Wellington School as "Down to earth. Punches above its weight. No sense of entitlement. Good value for money. Not our words, those of a parent. Says it for us, too".

== Sports ==
The school has rugby pitches, cricket squares, football pitches, an all-weather pitch, all-weather training areas, tennis courts, squash courts, climbing wall and an indoor swimming pool.

Football was reintroduced in the 2003 school year.

Many students have gone on to represent the school in county and England hockey, national athletics, county and England fencing and county rugby.

== Music ==
The school's music department, dedicated to the ex-headmaster George Corner, includes a recording studio, iMac suite, and percussion studio as well as many practice rooms and two classrooms. All 15 pianos in the department are by Steinway & Sons, accrediting the school as an 'All Steinway School', the first of its kind in England.

The choral educator James William Webb-Jones was a housemaster of the school from 1945 to 1950.

Regular concerts are held throughout the school year, performance spaces include the department's 'Small Hall', the school's main hall (Great Hall) and the school chapel which is fitted with an electronic organ alongside a Steinway baby grand.

== Chapel ==
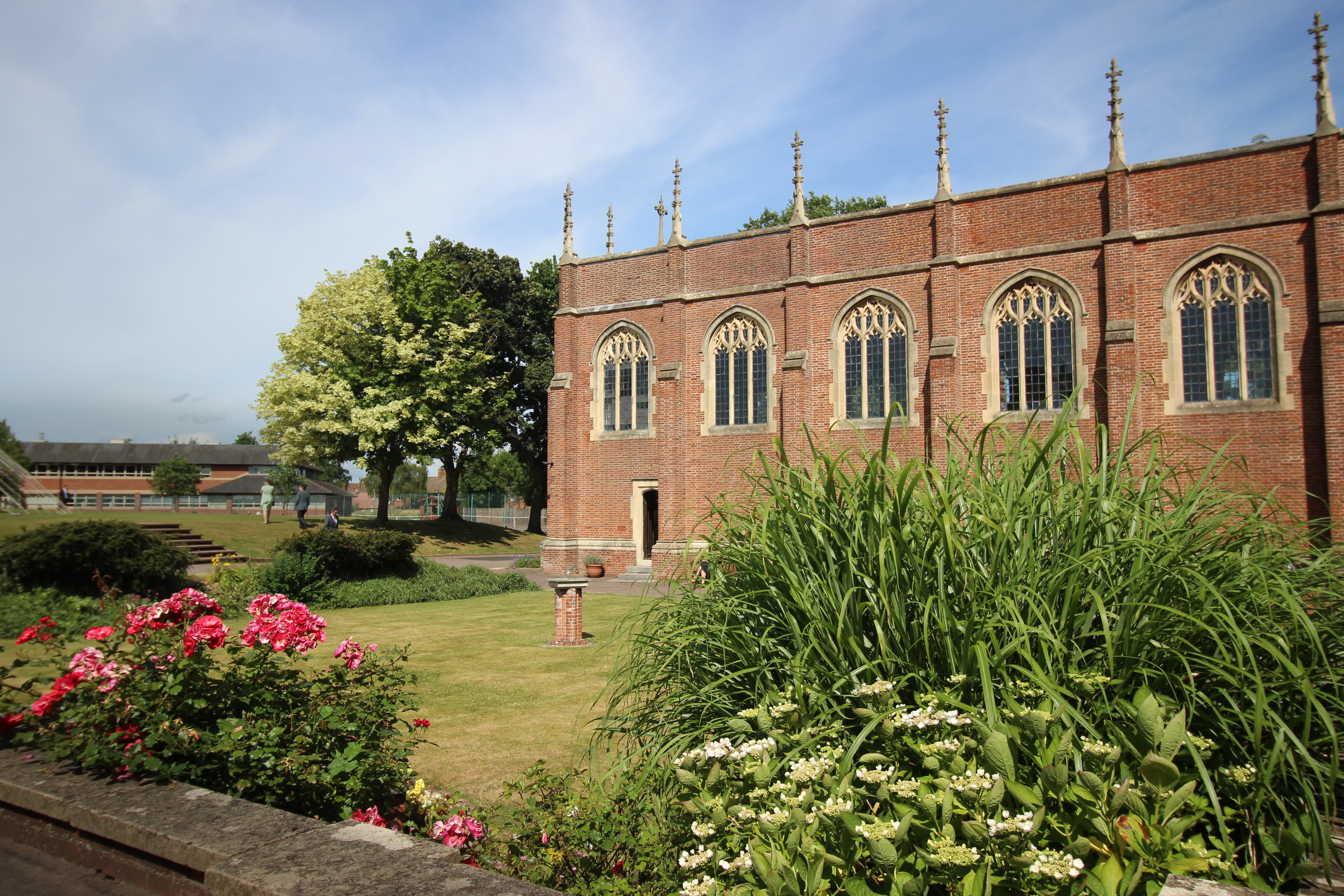
The School Chapel

Built between 1928 and 1931 by C. H. Biddulph-Pinchard, the Grade II listed red brick building is dressed with stone and has a flat roof which is concealed behind a parapet. It is a rectangular single-cell chapel with a carved stone altar. The Chapel went through specialist restoration work in 2013 which involved the repainting of the ceiling among other maintenance tasks. This restoration was funded partly by the school's Old Wellingtonians' Association

The east end of the building holds choir stalls and an organ loft over the entrance vestibule. The interior is highly decorated with finely carved wooden wall panels and elaborately decorated canopies made of molded plaster.

The Church of England Chapel had a full-time Chaplain who prepared pupils for Confirmation annually until 2025. Though some assemblies and concerts are also held in the building, there are Sunday services throughout term time for boarders and members of the public; these involve regular performances by the school's chapel choir. There are also shorter services most days during the week with pupils attending on a house rota basis.

The Chapel was built as a memorial to those who fell during the first world war. George Corner, the then headmaster, wrote to the Old Boys and asked for their support in the project. The 37 members of the Wellington School Community who gave their lives are listed on the walls of the Chapel. Each year a pupil from each boarding house remembers one former pupil specifically, researching how and where they died and a basket of flowers is laid in their memory.

Confirmation and all the other occasional offices of the church are open to all members of the school community on request.

== Combined Cadet Force ==
The school has a Corps of Drums and active Combined Cadet Force, founded in 1901. Beginning life as the Cadet Corps until 1919, then became the Officer Training Corps until 1941, during WW2 it was the Junior Training Corps and in 1948 became the Combined Cadet Force. The Corps of Drums was formed in 1913, the Royal Navy section in 1977, the Royal Air Force section in 2004 and Royal Marines section in 2026.

The Combined Cadet Force is open to senior school pupils, and has circa 300 cadets across the Royal Navy, Royal Marines, Army, and Royal Air Force sections. In 2025 the oldest junior school pupils were allowed to join the Army section fortnightly alongside Duke of Edinburgh Award training. In 2026 the CCF made history by being the only school to have four sections and a Corps of Drums. The Royal Marines section was officially instated at the 2026 annual inspection with guest of honour being Sir Gordon Messenger.

The Army section at Wellington School CCF is unique in that it is not tied to a local regiment; instead the cadets wear the cap badge of the Duke of Wellington's Regiment. This stems from the deep history of the town and the Duke of Wellington himself.

The cadets learn military based skills such as drill, weapons handling, map and compass, battlecraft, climbing, abseiling and leadership development. There are various CCF camps, military training weekends and cadet competitions each year, during which the cadets go on field manoeuvres in order to apply the skills they have learned in a practical situation.

Wellington School is unique in having three field exercises a year, each lasting three days and two nights. A full-time member of staff at Wellington School runs the CCF and acts as the commanding officer, while others lead the sections. The cadets are required to present themselves for inspection by the masters in charge of each section on a weekly basis and to undergo training.

== Headteachers ==
=== Senior School Headteachers ===
- 1837 – 1848 Benjamin Frost
- 1848 – 1879 William Corner
- 1879 – 1885 Francis Raban
- 1885 – 1899 James Beuttler
- 1899 – 1938 George Corner
- 1938 – 1945 Aubrey Price
- 1945 – 1957 M Banks-Williams
- 1957 – 1973 James Stredder
- 1973 – 1990 John Kendall-Carpenter
- 1990 – 2006 Alan Rogers
- 2006 – 2014 Martin Reader
- 2014 – 2019 Henry Price
- 2019 - 2024 Eugene du Toit
- 2024–Present Alex Battison

=== Prep School Headteachers ===
- 2000-2004 John Wyatt
- 2004-2010 Harry McFaul
- 2010–2020 Adam Gibson
- 2020–present Victoria Richardson

== Notable alumni ==
- Reza Abdoh Persian-American playwright and poet
- Salar Abdoh Persian-American author and journalist
- Jeffrey Archer, Baron Archer, author and politician
- John Baker, judge and politician
- Thomas Benyon, politician
- Brigadier Shelford Bidwell, army officer and military historian
- Tom Carson, Great Britain international hockey player
- James Carson, Wales international hockey player
- Sir David Chipperfield, architect
- Rear Admiral Paul Chivers, naval officer
- John Fraser Drummond, fighter pilot
- Keith Floyd, chef, television presenter and restaurateur
- Sir Geoffrey Follows, Financial Secretary of Hong Kong
- Charles Garnsworthy, Baron Garnsworthy, politician
- Herbert Gamlin, England international rugby union player
- Frank Gillard, BBC broadcaster and administrator
- Harriet Hawkins, cultural geographer
- Niamh Holland, Somerset and Western Storm cricketer
- Colonel Cecil Law, 6th Baron Ellenborough, Baron Ellenborough, army officer and politician
- Bob Moran, cartoonist
- David Oxley, actor
- Vice Admiral Duncan Potts, naval officer
- John Robins, Wales international rugby union player
- Rodney Searight, oil executive and art collector
- Simon Singh, science author
- Tom Singh, founder of New Look
- Rachel Skinner, President of Institution of Civil Engineers
- Peter St George-Hyslop, physician scientist
- David Suchet, actor
- Sir Nigel Sweeney, High Court judge
- Lieutenant-General Sir Freddie Viggers, army officer and Gentleman Usher of the Black Rod
- Dhruv Parashar, Emirati cricketer

== Notable staff ==
- James William Webb-Jones, who was a distinguished choral educator, was a housemaster of the school from 1945 to 1950.
- John Kendall-Carpenter was headmaster of the school from 1973 to 1990. Kendall-Carpenter was President of the Rugby Football Union from 1980 to 1981, the England Schools Rugby Football Union from 1985 to 1990 and the Cornish Rugby Football Union from 1984 to 1987. He was also chairman of the committee that organised the first Rugby World Cup in 1987.

== Scandals ==
- A maths teacher, Andrew Crozier, was forced to quit in March 2003 after starting a sexual relationship with the 18-year-old head girl.
- Another maths teacher, Ian Sarginson, was convicted of indecently assaulting an underage male pupil in March 2004 and sent to prison.

== Arms ==
Coat of arms of Wellington School, Somerset
Notes Granted 2 November 1926; The open book represents learning. The dragons represent the county of Somerset. In the centre of the chief (upper part of the arms), there is a 'quarter' from the arms of the Duke of Wellington Escutcheon "Sable, an open book proper, edged and clasped Or and inscribed with the words 'Nisi Dominus frustra'; on a chief Or, between two dragons rampant combatant, a pale gules charged with a cross argent, in each canton five plates in saltire" Motto Nisi Dominus Frustra (Without the Lord, our efforts are in vain)
