= Treehouse of Horror VI =

- The Simpsons episode
- Episode no.: Season 7 Episode 6
- Directed by: Bob Anderson (Note: Computer-animated and live-action segments in "Homer^{3}" respectively directed by Tim Johnson and David Mirkin)
- Written by: John Swartzwelder ("Attack of the 50-Foot Eyesores"); Steve Tompkins ("Nightmare on Evergreen Terrace"); David X. Cohen ("Homer^{3}")
- Production code: 3F04
- Original air date: October 29, 1995

Guest appearances
- Paul Anka as himself; Marcia Wallace as Mrs. Krabappel; Dennis Bailey, Ron Brooks, Trish Doolan and Marsha Waterbury as Pedestrians in the 'Real World'

Episode features
- Couch gag: The Simpsons are hanged on nooses.
- Commentary: Matt Groening; Bill Oakley; Josh Weinstein; David X. Cohen; Bob Anderson; David Silverman

Episode chronology
← Previous "Lisa the Vegetarian"	Next → "King-Size Homer"
- The Simpsons season 7

"Treehouse of Horror VI" (titled onscreen as "The Simpsons Halloween Special VI") is the sixth episode of the seventh season of the American animated television series The Simpsons, and the sixth episode in the Treehouse of Horror series. It first aired on Fox in the United States on October 29, 1995, and contains three self-contained segments. In "Attack of the 50-Foot Eyesores", an ionic storm brings Springfield's oversized advertisements and billboards to life and they begin attacking the town. The second segment, "Nightmare on Evergreen Terrace", is a parody of the A Nightmare on Elm Street film series, in which Groundskeeper Willie (à la Freddy Krueger) attacks schoolchildren in their sleep. In the third and final segment, "Homer^{3}", Homer finds himself trapped in a three-dimensional world, and, later, Earth. It was inspired by the 1962 The Twilight Zone episode "Little Girl Lost". The episode was written by John Swartzwelder, Steve Tompkins, and David X. Cohen and was directed by Bob Anderson.

The first version of the episode was very long, so it featured a very short opening sequence and did not include several trademarks established in previous Treehouse of Horror episodes. "Homer^{3}", pitched by executive producer Bill Oakley, features three dimensional computer animation provided by Pacific Data Images (PDI). In the final scene of the episode, Homer is sent to the real world in the first ever live-action scene in The Simpsons. "Attack of the 50-Foot Eyesores" includes a cameo appearance from Paul Anka, who sings the song "Just Don't Look". Lard Lad Donuts, a fictional Big Boy-inspired donut chain created for the first segment, would ultimately be incorporated into the main continuity of The Simpsons.

In its original broadcast, the episode was watched by 22.9 million viewers, acquired a Nielsen rating of 12.9, finishing 21st in the weekly ratings, and was the highest-rated show on the Fox network the week it aired. In 1996, the "Homer^{3}" segment was awarded the Ottawa International Animation Festival grand prize in Ottawa, Ontario, Canada, and the episode was nominated for the Primetime Emmy Award for Outstanding Animated Program (for Programming Less Than One Hour).

== Plot ==
=== Opening ===
Krusty, as the Headless Horseman from The Legend of Sleepy Hollow, holds his laughing head and hurls it at the camera, causing the title, "The Simpsons Halloween Special VI", to appear on-screen in blood.

=== "Attack of the 50-Foot Eyesores" ===
Homer goes to Lard Lad Donuts to get a "colossal doughnut". Upon realizing that the colossal doughnut is the name of the doughnut that Lard Lad holds and actual doughnuts that size do not exist, he denounces the store and vows to get a colossal doughnut. He returns that night and steals the giant doughnut from the Lard Lad statue in front of the store. In the midst of a freak storm, Lard Lad and the other giant advertising statues come to life to terrorize Springfield. At Marge's insistence, Homer eventually returns the doughnut to Lard Lad, but that does not stop Lard Lad and his friends from causing destruction.

Lisa goes to the ad agency that created those advertising characters, and an executive suggests the citizens stop paying attention to the monsters as they are advertising gimmicks, and attention is what keeps them motivated. He suggests a jingle will help distract people from watching the monsters. Lisa and Paul Anka later perform a catchy song and the citizens of Springfield stop looking at the monsters, who lose their powers and become lifeless (although Homer has to be dragged away from the Lard Lad statue, holding a sign reading "Now With Sprinkles"). Homer is distracted and Lard Lad drops the doughnut, which rolls past Kang and Kodos, who are trying to hitchhike to Earth's capital. Kent Brockman signs off by advising viewers to stay away from destructive advertising, then Homer says "We'll be right back." (Note: A commercial for Ace Ventura: When Nature Calls follows in the episode's original broadcast.)

=== "Nightmare on Evergreen Terrace" ===
Bart has a nightmare that Groundskeeper Willie is out to kill him. He is slashed with a rake, and the scratches are still on his body after he wakes up. Many other students at Springfield Elementary School also say they were terrorized by Willie in their nightmares. When the students take a test, Martin—having finished his test first—falls asleep and is strangled to death by Willie in his dream, before waking up and dying in the real world. After Bart and Lisa tell Marge about the incident, she explains Willie burned to death after the thermostat was turned too high, his suffering drawn out by the spendthrift disrepair of the school and the parents of the students looking on and doing nothing; Willie swore that he would take his revenge out on their children in their dreams where their parents could not protect them.

Bart, Lisa, and Maggie try not to fall asleep for several days, but eventually, Bart decides that he is going to have to go to sleep and fight Willie in his dream. Bart falls asleep and attempts to find Willie, who appears as a lawn mower. Bart manages to trick Willie into mowing a sandbox containing quicksand, and Willie sinks. Willie recovers and turns into a giant bagpipe spider and is about to kill Bart as well as Lisa, who has entered the dream after also falling asleep. Suddenly, Maggie appears and uses her pacifier to seal the vent on Willie's spider body, resulting in Willie exploding. The Simpsons children awaken and despite being pleased to be alive, Lisa fears that Willie might still be around "out there, and could come back, any time, in any form." As it turns out, a very much alive and well, but apparently far less powerful, Willie exits a bus and tries to scare the children, but loses a shoe as he chases the bus to retrieve a gun he left aboard.

=== "Homer^{3}" ("Homer Cubed") ===
Patty and Selma visit the Simpsons, driving Bart, Lisa, and even the pets to evade them and consequently leave almost no place for Homer to hide. Desperate to avoid his wife's sisters, he looks behind a bookcase and enters a mysterious new world in which everything is in 3D. Homer explores the peculiar area, and finds that he is trapped within (the rest of the family can only hear his voice). He seeks help from them, but their attempts to rescue him are fruitless.

After a cone hits Homer, he throws it point first into the floor and accidentally pierces the fabric of the space-time continuum, creating a black hole that threatens to pull Homer and the rest of the dimension into it. Bart takes command and enters the third dimension to save Homer after tying a safety rope around his waist. Bart is unable to help, however, and the universe implodes on itself as Homer is sucked into the black hole. Bart is nearly sucked in as well, but is pulled back into the house thanks to his safety rope. Marge is sad that her husband is gone; Reverend Lovejoy attempts to console her by saying he has gone to "a better place". Homer is sent into the real world, landing in a dumpster in a live-action Sherman Oaks, Los Angeles. He walks around, frightened as people stare at him in confusion, but then is pleased to find an erotic cake store.

== Production ==
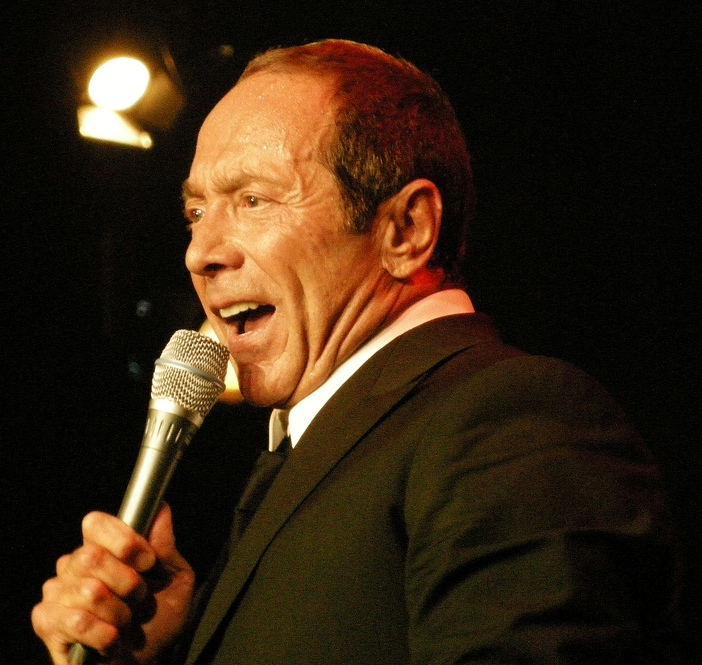
Paul Anka guest stars as himself. He had previously written a letter of thanks when he was referenced in an earlier episode.

"Treehouse of Horror VI" was the first of two Treehouse of Horror episodes to be executive produced by Bill Oakley and Josh Weinstein. The episode was "so long" because, according to Oakley, "all three of these segments are very complex stories [...] and it's hard to fit three complete stories into 21 minutes". Because of the length, the episode featured a very short opening sequence and did not include several trademarks established in previous Treehouse of Horror episodes, such as Marge's warning or wraparounds. The first segment, "Attack of the 50-Foot Eyesores", was written by John Swartzwelder, who had previously worked at an advertising agency. "Nightmare on Evergreen Terrace" was written by Steve Tompkins and has been described by David X. Cohen as "one of the scariest [segments]". "Homer^{3}" was written by Cohen, although the idea was pitched by Oakley. The original idea was that Homer would visit several dimensions where he change through different animation art styles, including one where everything was made out of paper cut-outs, but they decided that it would be too complicated.

The episode includes a cameo appearance from Paul Anka, who sings the song "Just Don't Look". He had been referenced in "Grandpa vs. Sexual Inadequacy," where Marge describes Homer as "Rex Harrison and Paul Anka rolled into one." In response, he sent a letter to the producers thanking them for the mention. After receiving the letter, they decided to ask him to guest star. According to David Mirkin, he tried to get Al Gore to host the episode, but the producers got no response to their request. "There was an eerie silence," Mirkin said. He added that "if the VP decides now to pursue this showbiz offer, it's just too late [...] He missed his chance." (Gore would later guest star on multiple episodes of Futurama.)

In the final scene of the episode, Homer is sent to the real world in the first ever live-action scene in The Simpsons. It was filmed on Ventura Boulevard in Studio City and directed by David Mirkin, who later said that Fox "couldn't have been less supportive" because they thought it would be too expensive. The scene involves a crane shot which pulls back as the credits are shown. Fox "begrudgingly" allowed Mirkin to use a crane for the ending. The scene was filmed on a sidewalk with the crane on the street and Mirkin was not able to fully stop traffic for the shot. Because of this, when the camera swings around, a line of cars can be seen backed up on the street. Mirkin was also disappointed in the quality of the camera pan, again blaming the lack of support from Fox and the inability to halt the traffic.

=== Animation ===
In what Bill Oakley considers the episode's "money shot", Homer steps into the 3D world

A large portion of "Homer^{3}" was three dimensional and computer-animated. Supervising director David Silverman was aiming for something better than most computer animation of the time. The animation was provided by Pacific Data Images (PDI) and overseen by Tim Johnson. The animators at PDI worked closely with the 2D animators on The Simpsons and worked hard not to "reinvent the character[s]". The animators storyboarded the segments and showed the PDI animators how they would have handled the scenes. While designing the 3D model of Bart, the animators did not know how they would show Bart's hair. However, they realized that there were vinyl Bart dolls in production and purchased one to use as a model. One of the most difficult parts for the PDI animators was to make Homer and Bart move properly without making them look robotic.

One of the key shots in the segment was where Homer steps into the 3D world and his design transitions into 3D. Executive producer Bill Oakley considers the shot to be the "money shot" and had a difficult time communicating his idea to the animators.

An edited version of Homer^{3} appeared alongside several other shorts in the 2000 American 3-D animated anthology film, CyberWorld, shown in IMAX and IMAX 3D.

=== Background jokes ===
Several background jokes were inserted into "Homer^{3}". The PDI animators inserted a Utah teapot, which was the first object to be rendered in 3D, and the numbers 734 (which on a phone pad correspond to PDI). Several equations were also inserted in the background. One of the equations that appears is 1782^{12} + 1841^{12} = 1922^{12}. Although a false statement, it appears to be true when evaluated on a typical calculator with 10 digits of precision. The answer is incorrect by approximately 7×10^{29}. If it were true, it would disprove Fermat's Last Theorem, which had just been proven when this episode first aired. Cohen generated this "Fermat near-miss" with a computer program. Other equations that appear are Euler's identity and P = NP, which is a reference to the famous P vs NP problem, and similarly contradicts the general belief that in fact P ≠ NP. The code 46 72 69 6E 6B 20 72 75 6C 65 73 21 is a string of hexadecimal numbers that, when interpreted as ASCII codes, decodes to "Frink rules!". There is a signpost with x, y, and z, and many basic shapes littered across the screen. While wandering around, Homer walks past a building that is identical to the library from the 1993 computer game Myst, complete with a musical homage to the game's soundtrack. In The Simpsons and Their Mathematical Secrets, Simon Singh notes: "we glimpse a cosmological equation (ρ_{m0} > 3H_{0}^{2}/8πG) that describes the density of Homer's universe. Provided by one of Cohen's oldest friends, the astronomer David Schiminovich, the equation implies a high density, which means that the resulting gravitational attraction will ultimately force Homer's universe to collapse. Indeed, this is exactly what happens toward the end of the segment." Cohen told Entertainment Weekly that the equation predicts "the universe is going to one day collapse in on itself, and that was to represent the fact that the 3-D world collapses in on itself at the end". The fate of the universe was an unsolved problem at the time, though Cohen noted in 2018 that "astronomers now believe that our universe will not collapse back in on itself". Cohen would later include references to Fermat's Last Theorem in "The Wizard of Evergreen Terrace", where solutions to it appear on a chalkboard.

== Cultural references ==
- The title of "Attack of the 50-Foot Eyesores" is a reference to the film Attack of the 50 Foot Woman.
- Lard Lad performs Godzilla's roar after awakening and the segment includes several references to the film series.
- Some of the mascots are parodies of real life mascots. The giant walking mascots of Prof. Peanut, The Giant Exterminator and the Zip Boys named Maury, Mel and Mack are parodies of Mr. Peanut, Mr. Little of the Western Exterminator company, and Manny, Moe, and Jack.
- "Nightmare on Evergreen Terrace" is a parody of the film A Nightmare on Elm Street and its sequels, and Bart's dream at the opening of the segment features many elements similar to the cartoons of Tex Avery.
- Groundskeeper Willie shapeshifting after falling into a sandpit is a reference to the death of the shapeshifting T-1000 in the film Terminator 2: Judgment Day.
- The segment "Homer^{3}" is a parody of The Twilight Zone episode "Little Girl Lost", in which a girl travels through a portal to the 4th dimension. At one point, Homer compares the situation to "that twilighty show about that zone".
- Homer passes by the library from Myst. Series creator Rand Miller later reflected on a call he received from the studio, when asked for permission to use the exact game graphics on the show.
- Mr. Van Brunt, the elderly ad man, was based on Mason Adams.
- The film Tron is also mentioned by Homer as a means of describing his surroundings.
- The three-dimensional rotation shot of the dimensional vortex is a reference to the green glowing grid in the opening credits of the Disney film The Black Hole.
- As he is about to fall in the black hole, Homer says, "There's so much I don't know about astrophysics. I wish I'd read that book by that wheelchair guy." This is a reference to the bestseller A Brief History of Time by theoretical physicist Stephen Hawking, who was quadraplegic, and who would make several guest appearances on the series.
- The title of the album Erotic Cakes by guitarist Guthrie Govan is a reference to the name of the bakery shop Homer enters in this episode.
- The Simpsons-themed doom-metal band Dr Colossus based their song "Lard Lad" on "Attack of the Fifty Foot Eyesores"
- The ending theme is listed on the soundtrack album Go Simpsonic with The Simpsons as an homage to Philip Glass.

== Reception ==
In its original broadcast, "Treehouse of Horror VI" finished 21st in the ratings for the week of October 23 to October 29, 1995, with a Nielsen rating of 12.9. It was watched in approximately 12.4 million households. The episode was the highest-rated show on the Fox network that week.

The authors of the book I Can't Believe It's a Bigger and Better Updated Unofficial Simpsons Guide, Gary Russell and Gareth Roberts, described it as "Complex, very assured and very clever, [...] The computer graphics are outstanding, and the final scene – as Homer enters our dimension – is one of the highlights of the entire series." Colin Jacobson of DVD Movie Guide said, "'Attack of the 50-Ft. Eyesores' stands as the strongest of the three segments. It doesn’t blast off the screen but it seems imaginative and fun. The Nightmare on Elm Street parody has its moments and comes across as generally entertaining. However, it lacks the bite the best pieces offer. Unfortunately, 'Homer^{3}' gives us the weakest of the bunch. It tosses out a few funny bits, but it mostly feels like an excuse to feature some 3-D animation." Ryan Budke of TV Squad listed "Homer^{3}" as the fourth best Treehouse of Horror segment and gave honorable mention to "Nightmare on Evergreen Terrace". Will Pfeifer of the Rockford Register Star called the episode "the best of the annual Halloween episodes". Mike Reiss considers the episode one of his favorites, and his favorite Treehouse installment.

In the July 26, 2007 issue of Nature, the scientific journal's editorial staff listed the "Homer^{3}" segment among "The Top Ten science moments in The Simpsons", highlighting Cohen's "1782^{12} + 1841^{12}=1922^{12}" equation.

In 1996, the "Homer^{3}" segment was awarded the Ottawa International Animation Festival grand prize. The episode was also submitted for the Primetime Emmy Award in the "Outstanding Animated Program (For Programming less than One Hour)" category because it had a 3D animation sequence, which the staff felt would have given it the edge. The episode did not win the award, which went to A Pinky and the Brain Christmas. Bill Oakley, speaking in 2005 on the DVD commentary for the episode, expressed regret about not submitting "Mother Simpson," an episode with a more emotionally driven plot and felt that it would have easily won had it been submitted.

In a retrospective review for The A.V. Club, Erik Adams praises the episode's visual inventiveness: "On a deeper level, 'Treehouse of Horror' endures because it's the one time a year the Simpsons staff can fully embrace the fact they make a cartoon. Various fantasy episodes and trips down the non-canonical timeline also afford this chance, but 'Treehouse of Horror' is a dependable, perennial opportunity to go whole hog with the animated wackiness. Any given episode of The Simpsons might find Homer surviving blunt trauma (and trauma and trauma and trauma, etc.), but only in 'Treehouse of Horror VI' can he trip through an interdimensional rift and drool in state-of-the-art for-1995 computer animation." He also notes that "Nightmare on Evergreen Terrace" is "packed with adventurous character designs and fantastical digressions—like the opening segment, which places Bart in an old-school, hand-drawn dream world with elegantly painted backgrounds and looser rules regarding talking animals. This is what I imagine Itchy and Scratchy shorts look like to Bart and Lisa—the ones produced while Roger Meyers Sr. was alive, at least."
