= Rodney Searight =

British art collector and oil executive (1909–1991)

Rodney Gerald Searight (8 September 1909 – 28 May 1991) was a British art collector, oil executive and artist. Searight lived and worked in the Middle East, primarily Egypt, for many years, and collected thousands of mostly European artworks connected to the area (described by the art history term Orientalism). In 1973 Searight's collection was described as "what is today probably the finest privately-owned collection of Middle Eastern art anywhere." His collection was bought by the Victoria and Albert Museum in 1985, where it is known as the Searight Collection.

== Early life ==
Searight's parents were Dorothy Gibson-Craig, the founder of the Brooke Foundation, and Lt.-Col. James Gerald Lamb Searight, of the Royal Scots (Lothian Regiment). They married in 1905. Searight was the oldest child, born in 1909, with younger sister Pamela born in 1915 and younger brother John Philip Searight born in 1917. His parents divorced in 1926, and that same year his mother married Major-General Geoffrey Francis Heremon Brooke, C.B., D.S.O., M.C., of the 16th/5th Lancers.

Searight was educated at Wellington School, Somerset. In London, he attended evening art classes at Chelsea Polytechnic.

== Career in the Middle East ==
Straight from school, Searight joined the Shell Petroleum Company, and in 1931 was posted to Cairo. He rose to General Manager there. He spent much of World War II in the Middle East, and then lived in Cairo until 1951. His work took him to Baghdad, Iraq from 1958–1960. He was later based in London as a director of the company, but remained involved with the Middle East. He retired in 1966.

Searight made sketches while in the Middle East: two are held in the collections of the Victoria and Albert Museum.

== Searight Collection ==
Searight began collecting quite late in his career, in 1959. His collection spanned drawings, engravings, watercolours, prints and books, all with the common theme of the Middle East: Orientalist art. He considered the foundation of his collection to be a watercolour of Cairo by David Roberts, bought in June 1959 (Note: Several references mistakenly refer to this as "1960". The information on the V&A accession page for the painting states Searight bought it in June 1959: https://collections.vam.ac.uk/item/O148370/grand-cairo-watercolour-roberts-david-ra/) for £52 10s. Searight's collection included works by over 700 individual artists, including David Roberts, William Henry Bartlett, Robert Moresby, William Simpson, John Frederick Lewis, James McBey, Robert Clive, Lieutenant Richard Temple, William Daniell, Robert Ker Porter, Eugène Flandin, Pascal Coste, Selina Bracebridge, Lieutenant J.B. Dayle, Sir David Wilkie, Edward Lear, Denis Dighton, Amedeo Preziosi and Godfrey Thomas Vigne, among others.

Searight's collection was housed in his Kensington flat. In 1969 he held the first exhibition of his collection at Leighton House in Kensington. Reviewing the exhibition, art critic for the Daily Telegraph, Terence Mullaly, wrote that it was "A fascinating collection . . . We gain insights into the rich heritage of a region fast being transformed by oil and the march of history."

A travelling exhibition of the collection took place from 1980–1981, including at the Talbot Rice Art Centre, University of Edinburgh (31 October–6 December 1980), and the Sainsbury Centre for Visual Arts, University of East Anglia, Norwich (3 January–25 January 1981). An exhibition catalogue was published, co-authored by Searight and Jennifer M. Scarce.

In 1985 the Searight Collection was purchased by the Victoria and Albert Museum, with financial aid from Shell International Petroleum Company, the National Heritage Memorial Fund, which contributed £20,000, and other organisations.

A microfiche catalogue of the collection was compiled by Briony Llewellyn, Tanya Szrajber and Jenny Elkan. In 1989 the V&A published the catalogue of the collection.

In 1995 a selection from the Searight Collection was exhibited by the Smithsonian Institution, Washington D.C., United States.

Searight's daughter Ann donated a small collection of ceramics collected by Searight to the British Museum.

== Personal life ==
Searight married Sibyl Vivian Walker in 1937. They had two daughters: Sarah Searight, a writer and Ann Searight, an archaeological illustrator at the British Museum. Sibyl died in 1967. In 1975 Searight married Theresa Clay, and they remained married until Searight's death in 1991.

From 1963 onwards Searight was involved with the Royal Geographical Society, in time being elected a Fellow.

In December 1972 Searight, then aged 62, was a passenger on the hijacked Ethiopian Airlines Flight 708, and was injured during the attack by the hijackers. Searight was part of a group described as 'elderly British birdwatchers' in a 2024 article about the hijacking; the attack with added birdwatching was the subject of a newspaper cartoon.
