= George Henry Evans Hopkins =

English entomologist

George Henry Evans Hopkins OBE (22 March 1898 – 20 February 1973) was an English entomologist.

Hopkins made major contributions in scientific research into three groups of insects – lice, fleas and mosquitoes.

== Early life ==
George Henry Evans Hopkins ("Harry") was born in Hanley in Staffordshire on 22 March 1898, the son of the Rev. George Blagden Hopkins, curate of Hanley, and his wife, Hannah Fletcher Evans.

He was educated at Upholland Grammar School in Orrell and Rossall School near Fleetwood in Lancashire (1911–1916). He sat and passed the Oxford and Cambridge Higher School Certificate in July 1916.

Great Britain having entered the First World War in August 1914, and the Military Service Act 1916 having come into effect, soon after leaving school Hopkins was liable for full-time military service. He accordingly enlisted a Private in the 4th Battalion, the Prince of Wales's Volunteers (South Lancashire Regiment) (Territorial Force), but was immediately posted to the 10th Officer Cadet Battalion in Gailes, near Troon in Ayrshire on the West coast of Scotland. Having completed his officer training, he was discharged from the cadet battalion on 24 January 1917 to take up a temporary commission in the South Lancashire Regiment and was commissioned as a Second Lieutenant in the 4th Battalion, South Lancashire Regiment (T.F.) on 25 January 1917. He was then posted to Park Hall Camp, Oswestry, Shropshire. After a prolonged period of ill health, he left for India in March 1918. He served with No. 4 Reserve Battalion (India) and the 1st Battalion, Madras Guards, Indian Defence Force. He did not see any active service on military operations.

His posting to Madras allowed Hopkins to pursue his interest in butterfly collecting. He sent a fellow-naturalist, Lieutenant-Colonel (later Brigadier) William Harry Evans, D.S.O., R.E., some specimens of a small Sarangesa (skipper) he had caught during the cold season at St. Thomas Mount in Madras, which were considered new to science and were ultimately described as Sarangesa hopkinsi, Evans 1921.

He returned to England, where he was demobilised and released from the army, before going up to Downing College, Cambridge in 1920. He continued to build his reputation as an entomologist, and was elected as a Fellow of the Entomological Society in October 1922. He graduated in 1923 as a Bachelor of Arts in medical entomology with specialisation in the Mallophaga.

== Samoa ==
In the summer of 1923 Dr. Patrick Alfred Buxton accepted a temporary post under the London School of Tropical Medicine to lead a research expedition to Samoa to study filariasis. "The plan was somewhat vague: perhaps to control the insect vector, perhaps to do work on its biology. Anyhow, he had plenty of equipment, generous terms and complete independence; so that the vagueness of plan was probably what he would have wished. He chose his own assistant, G.H.E. Hopkins, a careful worker and a good naturalist, and together they spent two years in Samoa".

Hopkins and his newly married wife left England for Samoa on 15 November 1923. Buxton wrote, "I left England in November, 1923, taking with me, as my assistant, Mr. G.H.E. Hopkins, B.A., of Downing College, Cambridge. On our way through Panama we were most courteously assisted by Colonel H.C. Fisher, the Chief Health Officer, and his staff; during the passage of the ship through the Canal we were able to study the public health arrangements of the Canal Zone, especially the permanent works which are now undertaken to reduce the diseases carried by mosquitoes. We reached New Zealand at Christmas time and made arrangements with the officials of the Ministry of Health for a laboratory assistant for the Apia laboratory. Travelling through Fiji we reached Apia in the middle of January, 1924." Hopkins recollected that they "visited all the islands of Western Samoa, and in addition were able to do a little collecting in Tutuila (American Samoa) on several occasions." He visited the Tongan island group during February–March 1925. Together with Dr Buxton he published two articles in The Bulletin of Entomological Research which appeared in 1925. He returned to England in January 1926, and collaborated in the writing of Researches in Polynesia and Melanesia. An account of investigations in Samoa, Tonga, the Ellice group and the New Hebrides in 1924 and 1925, which appeared in 1927. Buxton was cautiously complimentary: "Of my assistant, Mr. G.H.E. Hopkins, it is very difficult to write. He was with me two years in Samoa, and since our return he has co-operated in producing the greater part of this report. During the five months of my travels in the New Hebrides, he was in charge of the experimental work at Apia, and that says more for the standard of his performance than anything I could write here."

== East Africa ==
After spending a year in England, Hopkins accepted an appointment under the British Colonial Service as an entomologist in the Medical Department in Kenya Colony, which took effect in February 1927. He was transferred to Uganda as Government Entomologist (Medical) in August 1929. Among his duties was responsibility for determining "the incidence of plague by ascertaining the distribution of fleas (Xenopsylla spp) carrying the plague bacterium (Yersinia). To this end, between 1932 and 1945, he visited all districts collecting those rodents, living in association with humans, that were known to carry the fleas. These collections led Hopkins a stage further. He produced a comprehensive, authoritative review, which was never published, on the wild rodents of Uganda. Like Pitman, Hopkins made his contributions to the BM(NH) donating 472 specimens, mainly rodents" (Delany). During the nineteen thirties Hopkins established himself in the Entomological Section of the Agricultural Laboratories in Kampala. In 1936 he published a major study, Mosquitoes of the Ethiopian Region. I. Larval bionomics of mosquitoes and taxonomy of culicine larvae.

He was also responsible for publishing many articles in learned journals on fleas, lice, mammals and birds.

He served as President of the Uganda Society during 1945–1946.

Hopkins retired from the Colonial Service, and left Uganda in 1947. En route home to England he visited South Africa and spent some days with the staff of the Medical Ecological Centre in Johannesburg, "laying out the foundation and format for their book on fleas and plague in South Africa" (Hubbard).

In recognition of his considerable contribution to medical entomology in Uganda he was created an Officer of the Civil Division of the Order of the British Empire [O.B.E.] in the King's Birthday Honours in June 1947.

His paper, "Report on Rats, Fleas, and Plague in Uganda", appeared in 1949.

== Tring ==
In 1948 Hopkins commenced his last great work of scholarship. He was appointed as an Honorary Associate of the British Museum (Natural History), Zoological Museum, Tring in Hertfordshire, to collaborate with Miriam Rothschild (Mrs. George Lane) in bringing out An Illustrated Catalogue of the Rothschild Collection of Fleas. He moved to live near his place of work, acquiring "Shire House" in West Leith, on the south-west edge of Tring, where he continued to live for more than twenty years.

After moving to Tring, Hopkins described five new species of fleas: Xenopsylla philoxera, Hopkins 1949; Plocopsylla ulysses, Hopkins 1951; Peromyscopsylla draco, Hopkins 1951; Cratynius crypticus, Hopkins and Traub 1955; and Demeillonia miriamae, Hopkins and De Meillon 1964. In 1963 Robert Traub erected a new genus which he named after Hopkins – Hopkinsipsylla.

Scholarly journal articles, papers and books continued to flow from his pen. He contributed "Notes on Medical Entomology" for Tropical Hygiene and Sanitation. A Course of Study and a Reference Book for Sanitary Inspectors in the Tropics in 1950, and A Check List of the Genera and Species of Mallophaga in collaboration with Dr. Theresa Clay in 1952.

In addition, in 1958 and 1961, Hopkins donated his collection of 11,000 Phthiraptera (lice) specimens to the Natural History Museum.

== Retirement and death ==
C. Andresen Hubbard described the end of Hopkins' career in dramatic terms: "One morning during the end of September 1967 Harry came to the siphonapteran laboratory of the Tring Museum as he had for some years, opened his files for volume 5 of the ‘Catalog,’ worked his laboratory day, went home and never again returned. Two years previously Harry had spent his vacation in Holland, contracted virus pneumonia there and was never again in the health which had been his joy through all his years." He was ultimately admitted to St. Paul's Hospital, Hemel Hempstead in Hertfordshire, and died, aged 74 years, in Hemel Hempstead on 20 February 1973. He bequeathed his collection of lepidoptera to the St Albans Museum.

The book, The Rothschild collection of fleas: the Ceratophyllidae: key to the genera and host relationships, with notes on their evolution, zoogeography and medical importance, was posthumously dedicated to Hopkins.

Harry Hopkins was said to possess all the qualities of an Englishman of the old school, who greatly enriched ecto-parasitic research with a wealth of ideas and sound, painstaking research.

== Personal life ==
Hopkins was married in October 1923 to Doris May Griffin, the daughter of William Jewkes Griffin and his wife, Ellen Forshaw (she was born in St Helens in Lancashire on 14 April 1897.) There were no surviving children of the marriage.

Mrs Hopkins survived her husband by many years, dying, aged 92, in 1989.

== Portrait ==
A portrait of Hopkins has been published at the website of the International Society of Phthirapterists (ISoP), see Hopkins, G.H.E.
