= Hughes-Hunter baronets =

British noble family, Baronet of Plas Coch

The Hughes-Hunter Baronetcy, of Plas Coch (Welsh: Plâs Côch) in the Parish of Llanedwen in the County of Anglesey, was a title in the Baronetage of the United Kingdom.

It was created on 5 December 1906 for the landowner Colonel Charles Hughes-Hunter, a deputy lieutenant, Justice of the peace and fellow of the Royal Society of Edinburgh. Born Charles Hunter, he married in 1876 Sarah Elizabeth Hughes, daughter and heiress of William Bulkeley Hughes. He assumed in 1904 by royal license the additional surname of Hughes.

The title became extinct on the death of the 2nd Baronet in 1951.

== Hughes-Hunter baronets, of Plâs Côch (1906) ==
- Col Sir Charles Hughes-Hunter, FRSE 1st Baronet (1844–1907)
- Sir William Bulkeley Hughes-Hunter, 2nd Baronet (1880–1951)

Coat of arms of Hughes-Hunter of Plâs Côch
Crest 1st, A greyhound’s head and neck Argent, collared Gules (Hunter); 2nd, A Cornish chough Proper, debruised by a pale wavy Argent, holding in the beak an ermine spot, and resting the dexter claw on a label of the Second (Hughes). Escutcheon Quarterly, 1st and 4th: Vert, three greyhounds at full speed in pale Argent, collared Gules, within a bordure Or, on a chief engrailed of the Second a fleur-de-lys Azure between two bugles of the Field, stringed of the Third, and virolled of the Fourth, (Hunter); 2nd and 3rd: Argent, a chevron couped Sable between three Cornish choughs Proper, each holding in the beak an ermine spot, all within a bordure wavy of the Second (Hughes). Motto Duw a ddarpar i'r brain (God will provide for the crows); above the arms: Dum spiro spero (While I breath I hope)

== Plas Coch ==
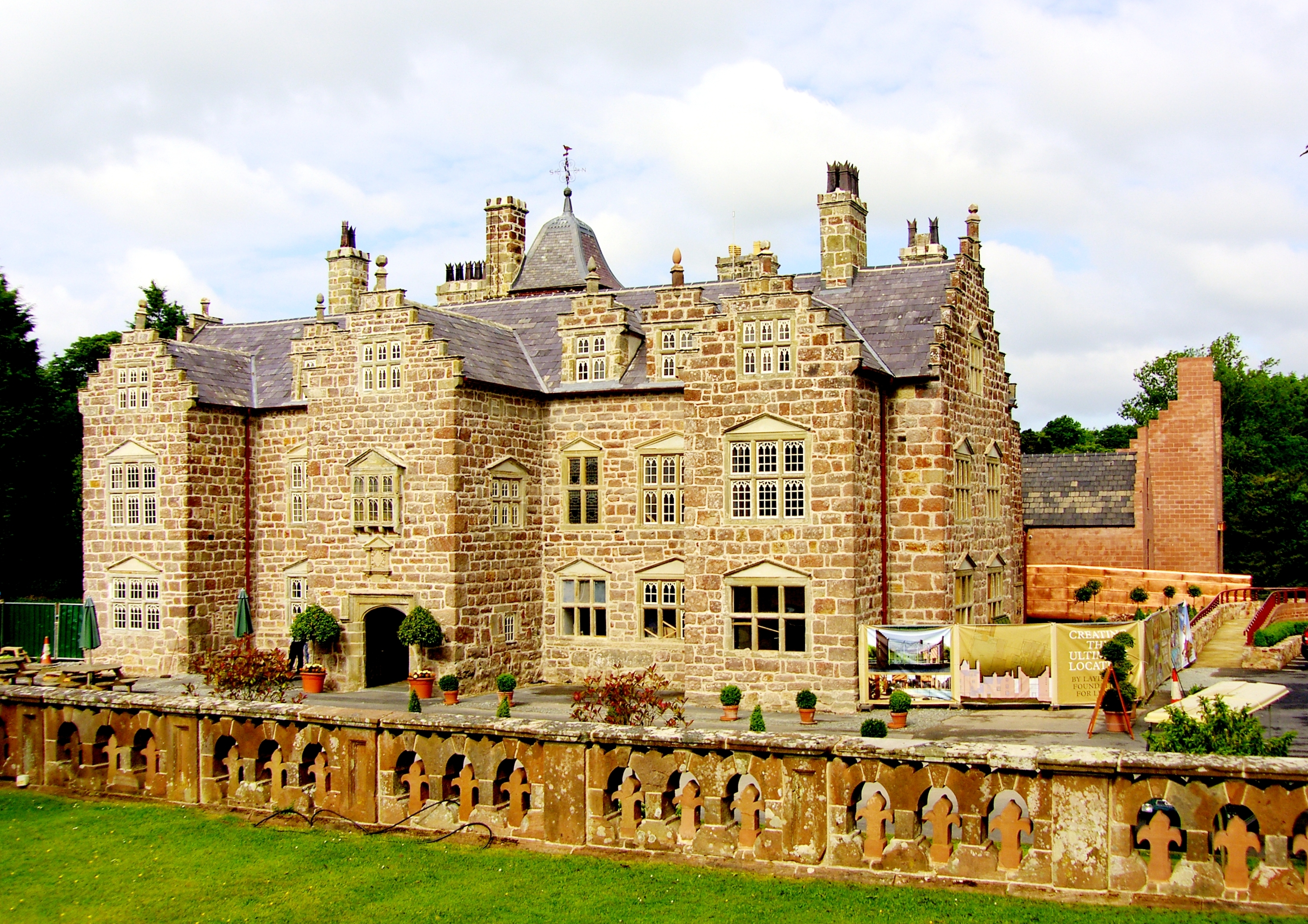
Plas Coch, Llanfairpwllgwyngyll, Anglesey, Wales.

The Hunter-Hughes baronets of Plas Coch, Llanedwen on Anglesey are descendants of an ancient family in Wales. Namely Llywarch ap Bran, Lord of Menai (c. 1137-80) of the Menai Commote in the medieval Rhosyr cantref (hundred) on Anglesey. Llywarch was the founder of the second of Fifteen Tribes of Wales, steward (seneschal) and in-law to King Owain Gwynedd, and a descendant of Rhodri the Great.

The location of Plas Coch (English: Red Hall) was known as Porthamel Issa (lower) and was once the seat of Llywarch ap Bran and his descendants from the 11th century. That was before 1569, the year of the hall's construction and renaming by the family heir, David Llwyd (Lloyd) ap Hugh (Hughes), a lawyer in London. The mansion is an earlier Renaissance type built with particular "ornate crow-stepped gables" and carved finials. Plas Coch was remodeled by David's son, Hugh Hughes, attorney general for North Wales in 1587, three times High Sheriff of Anglesey and Lord Chief Justice of Ireland, however, Hughes was appointed by King James I of England to work in Ireland before he died, and he never served in office. The addition was of a tower was by Hugh Hughes I, it was added between 1590-1600. The manor house was remodeled by its occupants for the final time around 1820. The building work was done in the style of the original builder. The work was planned by the then owner, William Bulkely-Hughes, father of the wife of the first baronet Hunter-Hughes. The home has many spandrels, one of them has the Coat of Arms of Llywarch ap Bran, the arms were later used by the Hughes of Plas Coch family.

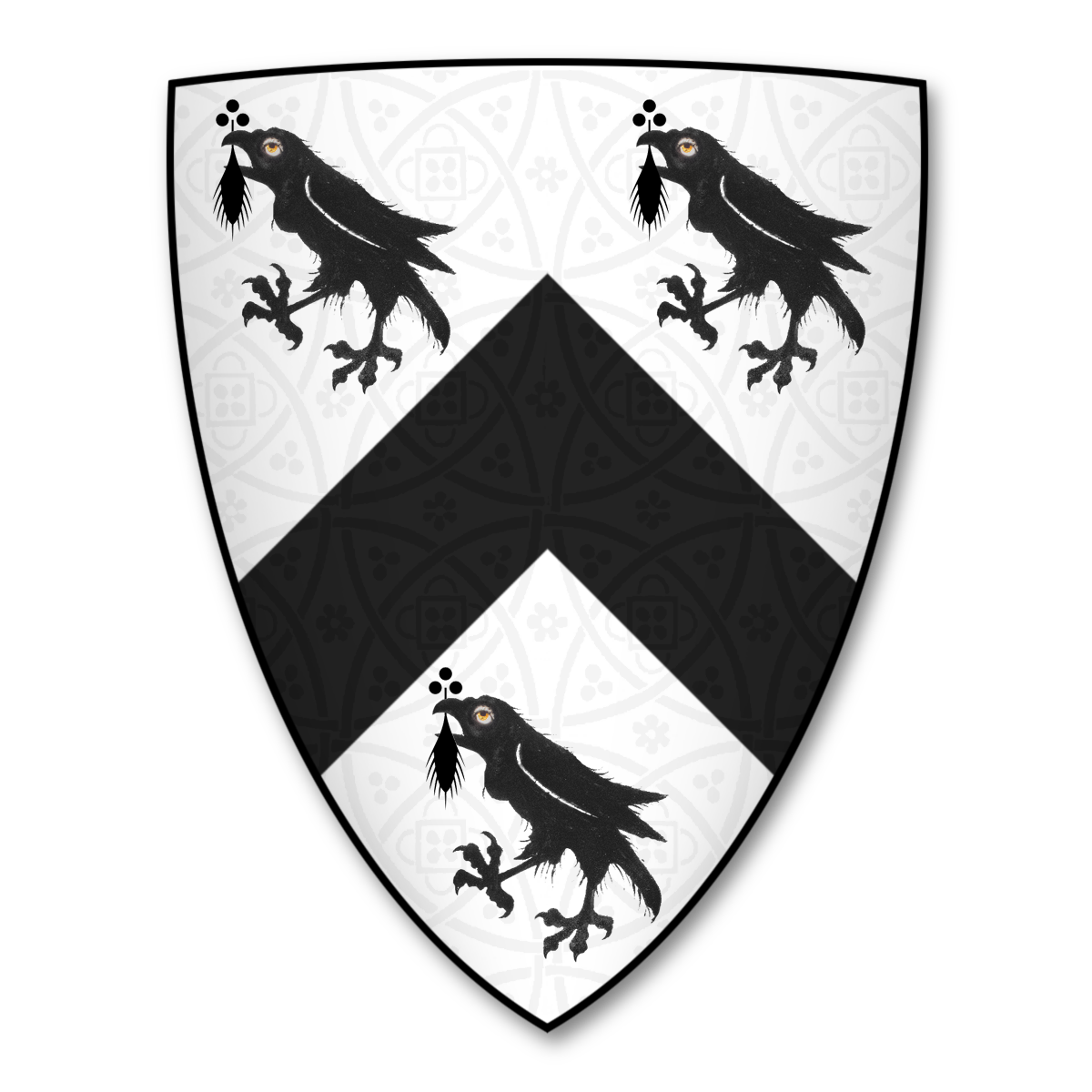
Coat of Arms of Llywarch ap Bran, and Hughes of Plas Coch.

The Elizabethan manor is now a Grade II* listed building and was sold as a dilapidated and moribund manor to be redeveloped by Donald Insall Associates in 2008-2009. The manor was converted into a luxurious leisure park. By 2010, the expenses were £9.5m for repairs and a new build. The total money spent was £18,000,000 for upgrading the surrounding grounds, including building a swimming pool and holiday homes.

Baronetage of the United Kingdom
Preceded by Graham baronets	Hughes-Hunter baronets of Plas Coch; 5 December 1906	Succeeded by Dewar baronets
