= Sir Andrew Graham, 5th Baronet =

British Army officer

Lieutenant General Sir Andrew Graham Bt CB CBE
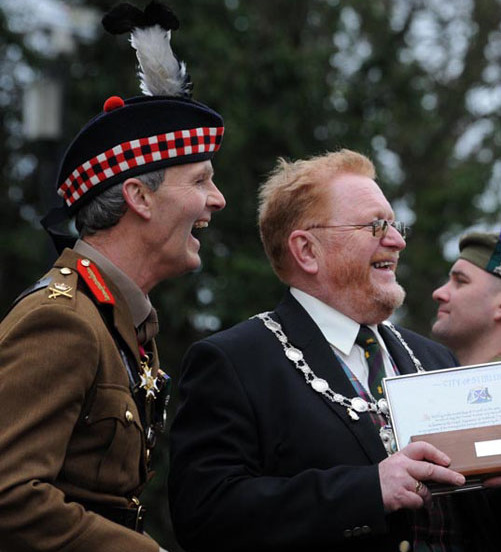
- Lieutenant General Graham (left) in 2012
- Born: 21 October 1956 (age 69)
- Military career
- Allegiance: United Kingdom
- Branch: British Army
- Service years: 1975–2011
- Rank: Lieutenant General
- Commands: 3rd Infantry Brigade; Argyll and Sutherland Highlanders
- Conflicts: Operation Banner; Iraq War
- Awards: Companion of the Order of the Bath; Commander of the Order of the British Empire; Officer of the Legion of Merit (United States)

Lieutenant General Sir Andrew John Noble Graham, 5th Baronet, CB, CBE (born 21 October 1956) was the second Colonel of the Royal Regiment of Scotland and was Director General of the Defence Academy of the United Kingdom.

== Early life and education ==
Graham is the son of Sir John Graham, 4th Baronet: he succeeded as 5th Baronet on his father's death on 11 December 2019. He was educated at Eton College and Trinity College, Cambridge.

== Military career ==
Graham was commissioned into the Argyll and Sutherland Highlanders (Princess Louise's) in 1975. He was appointed a Member of the Order of the British Empire in the 1993 New Year Honours, became Commanding Officer of his regiment in 1995 and commander of the 3rd Infantry Brigade in 1999. He served in Northern Ireland in 2001, for which he was advanced to Commander of the Order of the British Empire, and was appointed Director Army Resources and Plans. He went on to be Deputy Commanding General Multi-National Corps – Iraq in early 2004 and Director General Army Training & Recruiting Agency later in 2004. He became the Royal Regiment of Scotland's second Colonel from 31 March 2007 to 2014, as well as Director General of the Defence Academy of the United Kingdom from 2008. He was appointed a Companion of the Order of the Bath in the 2011 Birthday Honours.

== Later life ==
Graham unsuccessfully stood for the Conservative Party in the 2016 England and Wales police and crime commissioner elections in Dorset.

Military offices
New command	Deputy Commanding General Multi-National Corps – Iraq; March – September 2004	Succeeded by Andrew Farquhar
Preceded by Sir John Kiszely	Director General of the Defence Academy; 2008–2011	Succeeded by Peter Watkins
Baronetage of the United Kingdom
Preceded by John Alexander Noble Graham	Baronet of Larbert House and Househill; 2019–present	Incumbent
