= Big Bang (Singh book) =

Popular science book by Simon Singh

- First edition
- Author: Simon Singh
- Subject: The Big Bang theory
- Genre: Nonfiction
- Publisher: Fourth Estate
- Publication date: 2004
- ISBN: 0-00-719382-3

Big Bang: The most important scientific discovery of all time and why you need to know about it is a book written by Simon Singh and published in 2004 by Fourth Estate.

Big Bang chronicles the history and development of the Big Bang model of the universe, from the ancient Greek scientists who first measured the distance to the Sun to the 20th century detection of the cosmic radiation still echoing the dawn of time.

The book discusses how different theories of the universe evolved, along with a personal look at the people involved.

== Before Big Bang theories ==
The book takes up how the inaccuracies of the theories of Copernicus and Galileo lead them to be dismissed. Copernicus and Galileo used false arguments to persuade people that the Earth went in circles around the Sun, and that the Sun was the center of the universe. Both these statements were alien to the public at the time, and are still alien to a modern public. Only the finally mathematically correct interpretation of Johannes Kepler made the theories accepted, within a single generation. As Singh points out, the old generation must die before a new theory can be accepted.

== The Big Bang theory evolves ==
In parallel to the evolution of the Big Bang theory, the book tells the personal stories of the people who played a part in advancing it, both by hypothesis and by experiment. These include Albert Einstein, for his General Relativity, Alexander Alexandrovich Friedman for first discovering that this theory led to an expanding universe, Georges Lemaître who independently of Friedman discovered an expanding universe, and then concluded the theory must lead to an initial event of creation, which is the Big Bang theory we know today, Edwin Hubble for observing that the universe expanded, thereby confirming Friedman and Lemaître, George Gamow, Ralph Asher Alpher, Robert Herman, Martin Ryle, Arno Allan Penzias and Robert Woodrow Wilson, among many others.

Another theme of the book is the scientific method itself: how serendipity, curiosity, theory and observation come together to expand our understanding of the world.

Singh notes that Einstein initially dismissed the theory out of hand; such was his authority in the scientific community that none dared oppose him, thereby stifling research in this area for many years. However, when Hubble confirmed the theory, Einstein was quick to endorse both Lemaître and his theories.

== Reception ==
William Grimes of The New York Times praised Singh's ability to retain the reader's entertainment and comprehension even whilst explaining difficult scientific concepts, through use of diagrams, writing and illustrations. He wrote that, "[m]ore than the history of a single theory, [Big Bang] is an argument for the scientific method and for the illuminating power of human reason."
