= Sir John Graham, 4th Baronet =

British diplomat (1926–2019)

Sir John Alexander Noble Graham, 4th Baronet, GCMG (15 July 1926 – 11 December 2019) was a British diplomat who was ambassador to Iraq, Iran and NATO.

== Career ==
Graham, born in Calcutta, British India, the only son of Sir Reginald Graham, 3rd Baronet, was at school at Eton College. He served in the Grenadier Guards from 1944 to 1947, receiving a commission as a second lieutenant on 27 July 1945, barely over a month before the end of the Second World War. Following his military service, he then went with a scholarship to Trinity College, Cambridge 1948–50. On leaving Cambridge he joined the Diplomatic Service and studied at the Middle East Centre for Arabic Studies before being posted to Bahrain in 1951, Kuwait in 1952 and Amman in 1953. He was Assistant Private Secretary to the Secretary of State for Foreign Affairs 1954–57 and then served at Belgrade 1957–60, Benghazi 1960–61, the Foreign Office 1961–66 and Kuwait 1966–69.

Graham was Principal Private Secretary to the Secretary of State for Foreign and Commonwealth Affairs 1969–72, serving Michael Stewart and Sir Alec Douglas-Home. He was then posted as Counsellor (later Minister) and Head of Chancery at Washington 1972–74; Ambassador to Iraq 1974–77; deputy Under-Secretary at the Foreign and Commonwealth Office (FCO) 1977–79; Ambassador to Iran 1979–80; deputy Under-Secretary again 1980–82; and finally Ambassador and Permanent Representative to NATO in Brussels 1982–86.

After retiring from the Diplomatic Service in 1986, Graham was Registrar of the Order of St Michael and St George 1987–2001 and was also Director of the Ditchley Foundation 1987–92.

Graham died on 11 December 2019 at the age of 93.

== Honours ==
Graham was appointed a Companion of the Order of St Michael and St George in the 1972 Birthday Honours, knighted as a Knight Commander of the Order of St Michael and St George in the 1979 Birthday Honours on his appointment to Iran, and promoted to Knight Grand Cross of the Order of St Michael and St George in the 1986 New Year Honours. He succeeded to the baronetcy on the death of his father in 1980.

Diplomatic posts
Preceded by Donald Maitland	Principal Private Secretary to the Foreign Secretary; 1969–1972	Succeeded by Antony Acland
New office Break in diplomatic relations	Ambassador Extraordinary and Plenipotentiary to the Republic of Iraq; 1974–1977	Succeeded by Alexander Stirling
Preceded by Sir Anthony Parsons	Ambassador Extraordinary and Plenipotentiary at Tehran; 1979–1980	Break in diplomatic relations
Preceded by Sir Clive Rose	UK Permanent Representative on the North Atlantic Council; 1982–1986	Succeeded by Sir Michael Alexander
Baronetage of the United Kingdom
Preceded by John Reginald Noble Graham	Baronet of Larbert House and Househill; 1980–2019	Succeeded by Andrew John Noble Graham
