= Ethiopian Airlines Flight 708 =

1972 aircraft highjacking attempt

Coordinates: 9°1′48″N 38°44′24″E

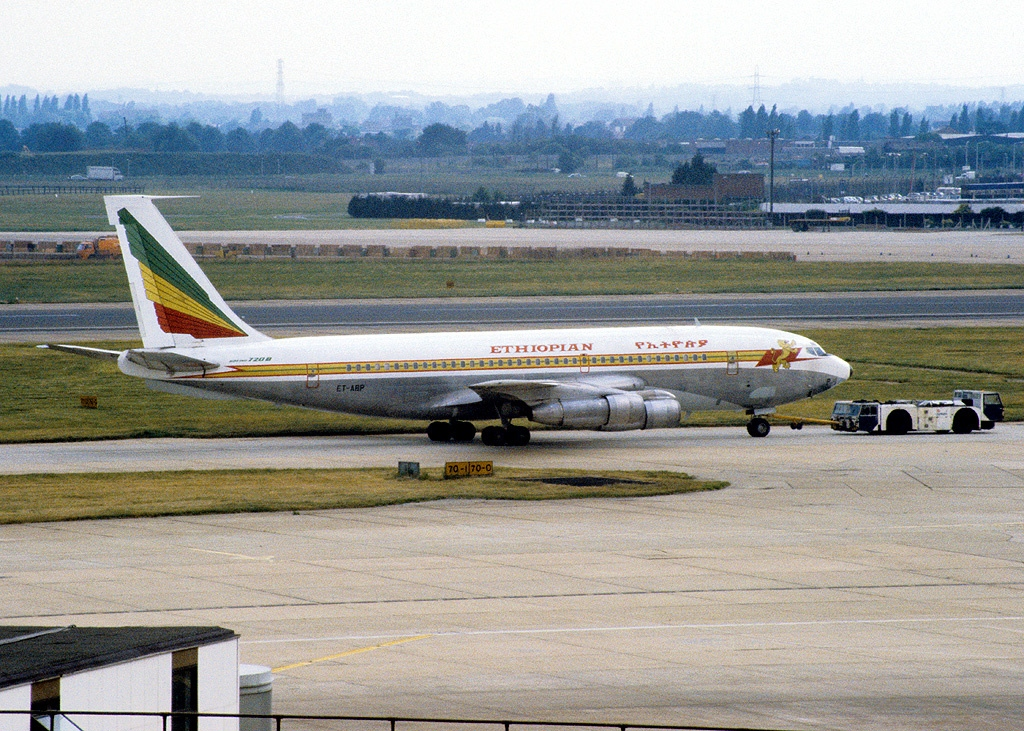
- An Ethiopian Airlines Boeing 720, registration ET-ABP, similar to the incident aircraft

Incident
- Date: 8 December 1972
- Summary: Attempted hijacking
- Site: Addis Ababa, Ethiopia

Aircraft
- Aircraft type: Boeing 720-060B
- Operator: Ethiopian Airlines
- Call sign: ETHIOPIAN 708
- Flight origin: Haile Selassie I International Airport
- 1st stopover: Asmara International Airport
- 2nd stopover: Ellinikon International Airport
- 3rd stopover: Leonardo da Vinci-Fiumicino Airport
- Destination: Charles de Gaulle Airport
- Fatalities: 7 hijackers
- Survivors: 87

Ethiopian Airlines Flight 708 was a Boeing 720-060B, due to operate an international scheduled Addis Ababa–Asmara–Athens–Rome–Paris passenger service, that experienced a hijacking attempt on 8 December 1972.

== Summary ==
Minutes after departing from Haile Selassie I International Airport bound for Paris, when the aircraft was flying at some 29,000 feet (8,800 m), seven members (Note: There exists a discrepancy over the number of men and women in the group that attempted to hijack the aircraft, depending upon the source: five men and two women, or six men and a woman.) of the Eritrean Liberation Front stood up and tried to gain control of the plane. Onboard security guards opened fire on the hijackers, killing six. During the firefight a hand grenade that was armed by one of the hijackers was rolled down the aisle by a passenger. The grenade exploded in the rear part of the fuselage, some 6 inches (150 mm) off the plane's centreline, blowing a hole in the cabin floor and damaging or severing several controls of the aircraft, including those of throttle of two engines, of the rudder, and of the horizontal stabiliser. Despite this, the crew turned back the airplane to the airport of origin and managed to land it safely; it sustained minor damages that were later repaired. The seventh hijacker died in hospital of their injuries.

One of the passengers on the flight was English retired oil executive and art collector Rodney Searight. He was injured during the attack by the hijackers.

== See also ==
- Ethiopian Airlines accidents and incidents
- List of aircraft hijackings
