= Theresa Clay =

British entomologist

- Born: 7 February 1911
- Died: 17 March 1995 (aged 84); Dorset, England
- Other name: Theresa Clay Searight
- Education: University of Edinburgh
- Known for: Research on Mallophaga, probable collaboration in Richard Meinertzhagen's frauds
- Spouse: Rodney G. Searight
- Scientific career
- Fields: Entomology
- Institutions: British Museum (Natural History)
- Author abbrev. (zoology): Clay

Theresa Rachel "Tess" Clay (7 February 1911 – 17 March 1995) was an English entomologist. She was introduced to zoology by her older relative, the ornithologist and adventurer Richard Meinertzhagen, with whom she had an unusually close relationship. She became the world's expert on Mallophaga, or chewing lice; however, her work is cast into question by her suspected role in Meinertzhagen's many scientific frauds.

During and immediately after World War II, she worked with Victor Rothschild at MI5.

== Early life and family ==
Clay was born on 7 February 1911, to Sir George Felix Neville Clay, 5th Baronet, one of the Clay Baronets, and Rachel Hobhouse Clay. Clay had four siblings, older sisters Margaret and Janet, older brother Henry, and younger brother Anthony. Clay's family lived at No. 18 Kensington Park Gardens, Notting Hill, London, and she attended at St Paul's Girls' School.

== Relationship with Richard Meinertzhagen ==
When Clay was eleven years old, her first cousin once-removed, or "uncle", Richard Meinertzhagen, came to live in the house beside her family's, No. 17 Kensington Park Gardens. Meinertzhagen was a prominent ornithologist and a genuinely distinguished soldier, but he was also a "colossal fraud", who stole bird specimens and described spurious species from them, and invented and embellished military exploits. He kept typed loose-leaf diaries, a system which allowed him to rewrite his diaries and pass off his retrospective diary entries as authentic. Later he was to write in his diaries, contradictorily, that he didn't notice Clay and her sisters until they were older; that he felt a mystical bond with her when he first saw her; and that he dreamt of her when she was born.

What is certain is that Meinertzhagen and Clay were close by the time she was fifteen. Meinertzhagen started to have a cold relationship with his wife Annie, spending time with Clay and her sisters instead. The probably genuine parts of his diaries are filled with gushing praise for Clay, and include photographs, some nude, of the Clay sisters. On 6 July 1928, Meinertzhagen's wife Annie died in questionable circumstances, from what was ruled to be an accidental gunshot wound. After Annie's death, Theresa Clay and her sister Janet cared for Meinertzhagen and his children. Theresa was baptised at St Martin-in-the-Fields church not long after Annie's death, with Meinertzhagen as her sponsor.

From around 1930, Meinertzhagen and Clay were rarely separate, living, working and travelling together. Clay was Meinertzhagen's "housekeeper, nanny, secretary, and scientific partner". It is unknown if Meinertzhagen and Clay's relationship was "physical": Meinertzhagen's friend Victor Rothschild asked Meinertzhagen this outright, but was told "in no uncertain terms to shut up"; and a 1951 article in TIME referred to their relationship with "wink-wink, nudge-nudge innuendo".

Clay continued to live in No. 18 Kensington Park Gardens, but it was connected to No. 17 by an underground passage. Clay's mother disapproved of her relationship with Meinertzhagen, but the "general social acceptance" of Meinertzhagen's eccentricities prevailed, and Clay's mother simply avoided speaking with Meinertzhagen, speaking through others even in his presence.

Meinertzhagen named a number of bird species after Theresa, one of which, the Afghan snowfinch or Theresa's snowfinch (Montifringilla theresae), is authentic.

== Zoological career ==
It was Meinertzhagen who introduced Clay to zoology. He was an ornithologist, and after having her assist him in his work with birds, he decided she should pursue the study of bird parasites. When he collected birds, he would remove the parasites for her before prepping them. He already had amassed a large collection of bird parasites, and eventually had her catalogue it. With him, she went on expeditions to North Africa and the Middle East. In 1934, she received her bachelor of science degree from the University of Edinburgh.

Clay went on expeditions to the Arctic in 1935–38 and 1946–49. She started volunteering at the British Museum (Natural History) in 1938. In 1949, she was appointed as a staff member in the entomology department, and she remained there for the rest of her career. She became a Senior Scientific Staff Member in 1952, and a Deputy Keeper in 1970. In 1955 she gained her DSc from the University of Edinburgh on the basis of sustained original, authoritative work on Mallophaga, much of it published in scientific journals. This included "A check list of the genera and species of Mallophaga" (1955, coauthored with George Henry Evans Hopkins). According to K. C. Emerson, this work "was a historical milestone in Mallophaga taxonomy. All known publications on Mallophaga, containing taxonomic information were reviewed and the species were placed in a modern classification. The result was that 201 genera and 2,657 species were considered valid… Publication of this important paper marked the beginning of the new era in lice taxonomy, as it served as the new base from which further research could be undertaken." Clay frequently collaborated with Miriam Rothschild, and they wrote Fleas, Flukes and Cuckoos together in 1952.

While there is no evidence Clay helped Meinertzhagen commit any of his scientific (or other) frauds, it is unlikely that she was completely unaware of them. As his secretary, she was in a position to help him falsify diaries and records, and as a volunteer at the British Museum she is suspected of having facilitated his thefts. Even if she was largely unaware of the extent of his fraudulent work, many of the louse and other bird parasite specimens she studied and catalogued must have come from birds Meinertzhagen stole or of which he falsified the collection location and other data.

== MI5 career ==
Early in World War II, Clay was recruited into MI5 to assist Victor Rothschild, Miriam's brother. He was running a counter-sabotage section, trying to protect scientific and industrial targets from German attack and espionage. Although she never attained officer rank (MI5 had no female officers during the war after the dismissal of Jane Archer) Clay was closely involved with the running of the "Fifth Column" operation, in which the MI5 officer Eric Roberts masqueraded as a Gestapo spy in order to identify British fascist sympathisers. She stayed on after the war, and left in 1948.

== Later life ==
Clay married widower Rodney G. Searight, a wealthy retired businessman who spent most of his life in the Middle East, in 1975. She continued to live at Kensington Park Gardens until after her husband's death in 1991. She died on 17 March 1995, at a nursing home in Dorset. After her marriage, she retired from the British Museum; today her papers, drawings, and correspondence are held there. Unlike other staff members, Clay does not have a biography on the British Museum website.
