= Undergraduate Ambassadors Scheme =

The Undergraduate Ambassadors Scheme (UAS) is a program in the United Kingdom devised to encourage students enrolled in science, technology, engineering and mathematics (STEM) programs to enter teaching by awarding them with degree course credits.

== History ==
Noting the declining enrollment in STEM subjects at UK universities, a team including author Simon Singh devised the idea with three aims:

- to encourage undergraduates in those fields to go into teaching,
- to support teachers and
- to provide role models for school students who might otherwise never meet a young person who had chosen to study a STEM subject.

UAS was set up to provide a structure to get undergraduates into the classroom, based on a model pioneered at Imperial College London, but adding the incentive of academic credit for program participants.

After receiving approval to pilot UAS from the University of Surrey, Singh backed a launch of the program with his own money, with the assistance of Ravi Kapur and others. Student interest in the program was high. Singh indicated that in the pilot year of the program 10 of 13 math undergraduates who participate at the University of Southampton subsequently entered teacher training. By the midpoint of its second year, in February 2004, the program was being described by the Times Educational Supplement (TES) as a success, with nine universities onboard and an additional 30 expressing interest. In October 2005, Singh wrote in The Guardian that UAS was established in "over 50 university departments, mainly mathematics, science and engineering, with more coming on board each year." In the 2007–2008 academic year, involvement had risen to 107 university departments, with 750 undergraduate participants.

== Function ==
According to TES, undergraduates involved first participate in a one-day program to give them basic information on instructing students in math and science. After this training, they observe a local classroom and then put together a project for the students in a class. The UAS website indicates that the program, available in the last two years of a student's undergraduate career, carries ten to 30 credits for ten weeks of work in the classroom alongside the classroom's regular teacher, who helps evaluate the undergraduate's performance.
