= Dorothy Brooke =

British philanthropist (1883–1955)

- Born: Dorothy Evelyn Gibson-Craig; June 1, 1883; Salisbury, Wiltshire, England
- Died: June 10, 1955 (aged 72); Heliopolis, Egypt
- Known for: Animal welfare
- Spouses: James Gerald Lamb Searight (m. 1905; div. 1926) Geoffrey Francis Heremon Brooke (m. 1926)
- Children: 3, including Rodney Searight

Dorothy Evelyn Brooke (née Gibson-Craig; 1 June 1883 – 10 June 1955) was the founder of The Old War Horse Memorial Hospital in 1934 in Cairo – renamed The Brooke Hospital for Animals in 1961. Developing from a single operation in Cairo into one of the world's largest equines welfare organisations, at work in many countries, with headquarters in London, it is known today as Brooke.

== Early life ==
Dorothy Brooke was born Dorothy Evelyn Gibson-Craig on 1 June 1883 in the Cathedral Close at Salisbury, Wiltshire, England. She was the daughter of Henry Vivian and Emily Dulcibella (Wilmot) Gibson-Craig. Her grandfather was the Rt. Hon. Sir William Gibson-Craig of Riccarton. Her childhood was spent in Scotland, Wiltshire and Hampshire. By family and friends, she was always called Dodo.

She was first married in 1905 to Lt.-Col. James Gerald Lamb Searight, The Royal Scots (Lothian Regiment). They were divorced in 1926.

In 1926 Brooke married again, to Major-General Geoffrey Francis Heremon Brooke, C.B., D.S.O., M.C. (1884–1966), 16th/5th Lancers. Geoffrey Brooke was a recognised horse expert and author. Among his many titles are Horse-Sense and Horsemanship of Today (1924); Horse Lovers (1927); Horsemanship: The Way of a Man with a Horse (1929); and Good Company (1954). He trained and rode his own steeplechasers, he was a polo-player and show-jumper. He competed as a member of the British equestrian team in the 1924 Summer Olympics, although he had broken his collarbone a few days earlier.

Brooke had three children: Rodney Gerald Searight, born 1909; Pamela Searight, born 1915; and John Philip Searight, born 1917.

== Life in Cairo ==
In 1930, Geoffrey Brooke was appointed to the command of the British Cavalry Brigade in Egypt. It was at this time that Dorothy Brooke realised she would have to search for the old war horses, whom “she hated to remember yet could not forget”. She could not be in Egypt and fail to do so. She had been devoted to horses since her childhood.

== War Horses in Cairo ==
In 1919, the cavalry, artillery and draught horses that had served in the British Army in the Egypt and Palestine campaigns of World War I had been sold in their many thousands to a life of continuous hard labour and a painful old age. Many had been requisitioned in England and had served in the British Yeomanry. Some had seen active service on the Western Front before being drafted as remounts to the Near East. Strict quarantine restrictions prevented the repatriation of the horses of the Australian and New Zealand Mounted Infantry.

During World War I, horses cast from the veterinary hospitals had initially been sold to Egyptian dealers. British residents in Cairo had protested so forcefully that this practice had been stopped.

After the Armistice, however, with 22,000 horses, mostly in Palestine and Sinai, requiring transport or disposal, the Remounts Directorate of the War Office ordered the local sale of all animals of 12 years and under that were deemed up to some work. Those over 12 and the unsound were destroyed.

The surviving horses had not had an easy war. They had carried often far too much weight – up to 22 stone (140 kg). They had experienced rationing, withstood piercing cold, dust clouds and exhaustion. Some may also have suffered both severe and light wounds. They had covered great distances, and some had endured a summer in the heat of the Jordan Valley.

By 1930, twelve years later, the war horses, many now of an advanced age, had been lost to view, toiling for the very poorest owners, or at night to avoid the police and Egyptian S.P.C.A., or in the stone quarries. Brooke had heard rumours from British residents who spoke of pitiful, emaciated creatures that they suspected were war horses. Their condition was said to be so bad that people could hardly bear to look at them. She was advised there could be two hundred. Weeks passed before she found the first, but eventually many more than two hundred were found. In the years from 1930 to 1934, she bought back 5,000 old army horses and mules.

== Campaign ==
There were many challenges and obstacles throughout the early years of Brooke's efforts. Progress was prolonged, and, as the wife of the senior cavalry officer in Egypt, she had strenuous social duties. Nevertheless, she acquired frail old horses when and where she found them. She raised money from her friends and from her own pocket, got together a Committee, and set in motion the Old War Horse Campaign of Rescue. By April 1931, six months after her arrival in Egypt, she was writing to the Morning Post to appeal for funds. Thousands of readers responded. King George V was one of her many supporters throughout the British Commonwealth.

At first, she used the premises of the Egyptian S.P.C.A., but this was to prove unrealistic in the long term, and it was difficult to find light, airy stables in Cairo – and to gain the necessary permission. However, she was persistent in working to raise money. During the first summer leave, she produced an 8-page pamphlet. There were further appeals in the press.

Almost all the old war horses were unfit to stand a voyage home. They were given water, days of rest, and feed, and treated to kindness. Some were humanely euthanised.

"As their ill-shod misshapen hooves felt the deep tibbin [broken barley straw] bed beneath them, there would be another doubting disbelieving halt. Then gradually they would lower their heads and sniff as though they could not believe their own eyes or noses. Memories, long forgotten, would then return when some stepped eagerly forwards towards the mangers piled high with berseem, while others, with creaking joints, lowered themselves slowly on to the bed and lay, necks and legs outstretched. There they remained, flat out, until hand fed by the syces."

== Buying Committee ==
Brooke had the services of a Buying Committee. It was composed largely of high-ranking British officers, where it is thought she was the only woman. The Chairman was General Sir Charlton Spinks, Sirdar of the Egyptian Army and fluent in Arabic. Other members included Major (later Brigadier) Roland Heveningham, R.A.V.C., who was to be first Veterinary Director of the Old War Horse Memorial Hospital, and Brigadier Geoffrey Brooke.

The Committee was buying up to 60 or 70 animals every week, and scouts searched throughout Egypt. It was a grim task. Sometimes, one of the male committee members might be too anguished to remain at the table. In the years 1930 to 1934, some 5,000 horses and old army mules were found. They were identified by their conformation and army brands. The price paid represented the cost to the owner of a replacement.

On a Friday, 'Black Friday', the day after Buying Day – and for nine months of the year, every year for four years – Dorothy Brooke would select those to be euthanised, quietly and without alarm, by a humane method.

Brooke never sought to blame the men and boys who through poverty and lack of knowledge, had failed their animals. The 'tragic sight' of the locally bred animals that appeared before the Buying Committee made her realise that a free hospital was needed – to which every poor owner could bring what might be his family's sole earner, and obtain expert help and advice at the first signs of trouble instead of waiting hopelessly. She had set up a separate fund almost from the start. She called this The Animal Assistance Fund.

== Legacy ==
At the end of four years, the war horse campaign could be closed. The Old War Horse Memorial Hospital was founded. Dorothy Brooke gained permission for the Hospital to place a drinking trough at the Pyramids. The Cairo city authorities eventually adopted a policy of sanding the slippery stretches of street.

Geoffrey and Dorothy Brooke moved from Egypt to India, where Geoffrey became Major-General of Cavalry. There Dorothy, besides giving her time and energy to the affairs of the Hospital, "threw herself into working to alleviate the suffering she saw all about her". She managed to return to Cairo for an annual visit.

== Death ==
The Brookes left India at the outbreak of World War II. After a gap – through precarious years for the Hospital – Dorothy Brooke was able to resume her trips to Egypt in 1946. In 1955, at their house in Heliopolis, on the outskirts of Cairo, she was not well enough to travel back to Wiltshire. She is reported as having remarked to her husband, some weeks beforehand, "If I die – not that I am going to for ever so long – promise me you won't go to my funeral service. I know it will only distress you and I shan't be there myself."

Dorothy Brooke died on 10 June 1955 and was buried in Cairo.

"Looking back on all she had accomplished," remarks Glenda Spooner, "one can feel certain that she thought little of her own share and a great deal of other people's, for that was ever her way. She was indeed overwhelmed with gratitude to those who had made the rescue of the horses possible and it was no mean achievement."

After his stepfather's death in 1966, Major Philip Searight succeeded Geoffrey Brooke as Chairman. He guided the organisation through a period of expansion. Dorothy Brooke's grandchildren and great-grandchildren have maintained a tradition of service to The Brooke. Ann Searight, her granddaughter, served as a Trustee 1979–2011 and in 2014 is Honorary Vice-President.

== Works cited ==
- Geoffrey Brooke, Good Company, Constable 1954
- Glenda Spooner, edited by, For Love of Horses, Diaries of Mrs Geoffrey Brooke, paperback edition, The Brooke Hospital for Animals
- The Marquess of Anglesey, F.S.A., A History of the British Cavalry, Volume 5: 1914-1919, Egypt, Palestine & Syria, Lee Cooper 1994; Volume 8: The Western Front, 1915-1918, Epilogue 1919-1939, Lee Cooper, 1997
- Maj.-Gen. Sir L.J. Blenkinsop and Lieut.-Col. J.W. Ramsey, History of the Great War based on Official Documents by Direction of the Historical Section of the Committee of Imperial Defence: Veterinary Services, H.M. Stationery Office, 1925
- Capt. Cyril Falls, History of the Great War based on Official Documents by Direction of the Historical Section of the Committee of Imperial Defence: Military Operations, Egypt & Palestine, Part II, Vol. 2, facs. ed. The Imperial War Museum, first published H.M. Stationery Office 1930
- Lieut.-Colonel the Hon. R.M.P. Preston, D.S.O., The Desert Mounted Corps: an account of the cavalry operations in Palestine and Syria 1917-1918, U.S. ed., Houghton Mifflin 1921
