= Simon Singh =

British physicist and popular science author (born 1964)

Simon Singh MBE
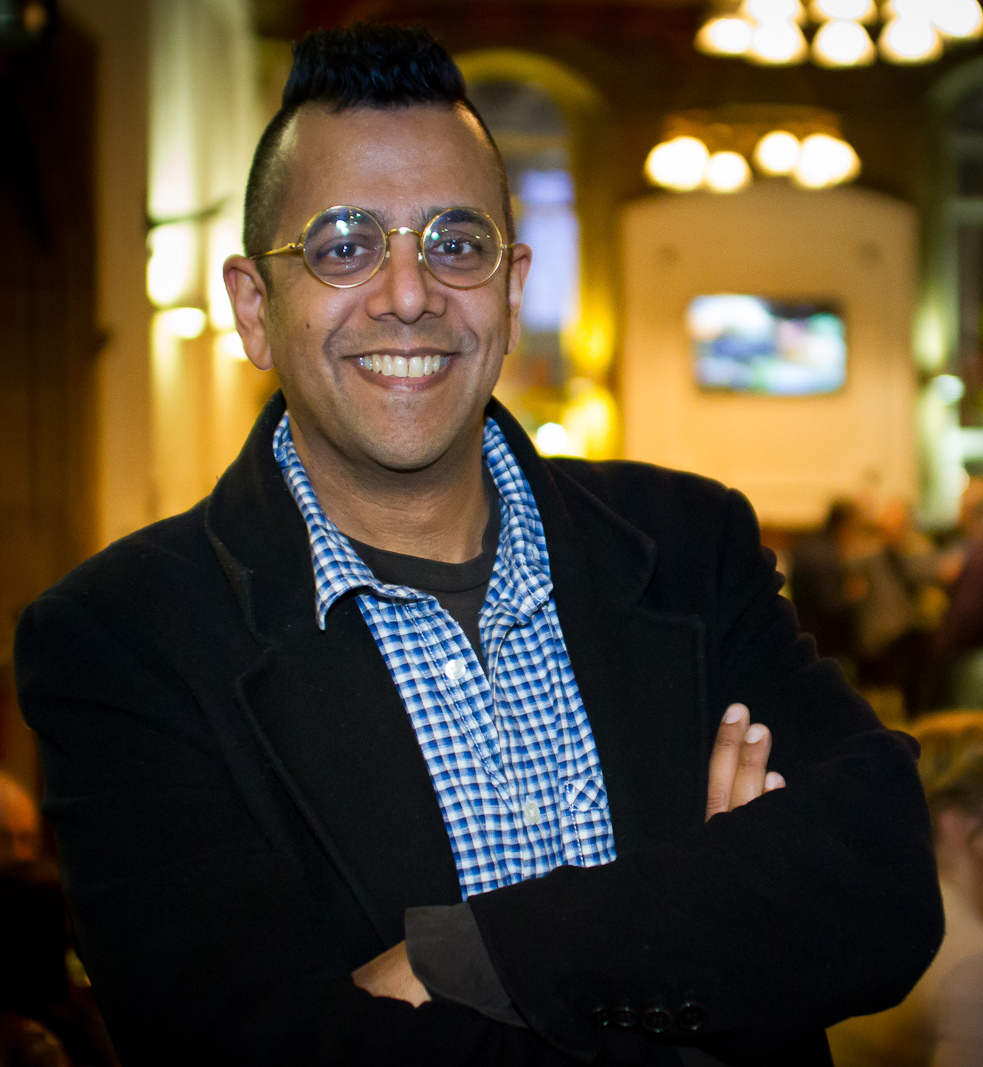
- Singh in 2013 at the Merseyside Skeptics Society
- Born: Simon Lehna Singh; 19 September 1964 (age 62); Wellington, Somerset, England
- Education: Wellington School, Somerset: Imperial College London (BSc); University of Cambridge (PhD)
- Occupations: Popular science author and theoretical and particle physicist
- Known for: BCA v Singh libel case; Fermat's Last Theorem (book); Big Bang (book); The Code Book; The Simpsons and Their Mathematical Secrets
- Spouse: Anita Anand (m. 2007)
- Children: 2
- Awards: Science Writing Award (2006); Kelvin Prize (2008); HealthWatch Award (2010); Leelavati Award (2010); Christopher Zeeman Medal (2022)
- Scientific career
- Workplaces: CERN; BBC
- Thesis: Heavy flavour physics at the CERN PP̄ collider (1991)
- Simon Singh's voice recorded August 2014
- Website: simonsingh.net

Notes
- Tom Singh (brother)

Simon Lehna Singh, MBE (born 19 September 1964) is a British popular science author and theoretical and particle physicist. His written works include Fermat's Last Theorem (in the United States titled Fermat's Enigma: The Epic Quest to Solve the World's Greatest Mathematical Problem), The Code Book (about cryptography and its history), Big Bang (about the Big Bang theory and the origins of the universe), Trick or Treatment? Alternative Medicine on Trial (about complementary and alternative medicine, co-written by Edzard Ernst) and The Simpsons and Their Mathematical Secrets (about mathematical ideas and theorems hidden in episodes of The Simpsons and Futurama). In 2012, Singh founded the Good Thinking Society, through which he created the website "Parallel" to help students learn mathematics.

Singh has also produced documentaries and works for television to accompany his books, is a trustee of the National Museum of Science and Industry, a patron of Humanists UK, founder of the Good Thinking Society, and co-founder of the Undergraduate Ambassadors Scheme.

== Early life and education ==
Simon Singh was born in a Sikh family to parents who emigrated from Punjab, India, to Britain in 1950. He is the youngest of three brothers, his eldest brother being Tom Singh, the founder of the UK New Look chain of stores. Singh grew up in Wellington, Somerset, attending Wellington School, and went on to Imperial College London, where he studied physics. He was active in the student union, becoming President of the Royal College of Science Union. Later he completed a PhD in particle physics at the University of Cambridge as a postgraduate student of Emmanuel College, Cambridge while working at CERN, Geneva.

== Career ==
In 1983, Singh was part of the UA2 experiment in CERN. In 1987, he taught science at The Doon School, an independent all-boys' boarding school in India. In 1990, Singh returned to England and joined the BBC's Science and Features Department, where he was a producer and director working on programmes such as Tomorrow's World and Horizon. Singh was introduced to Richard Wiseman through their collaboration on Tomorrow's World. At Wiseman's suggestion, Singh directed a segment about politicians lying in different mediums, and getting the public's opinion on whether the person was lying or not.

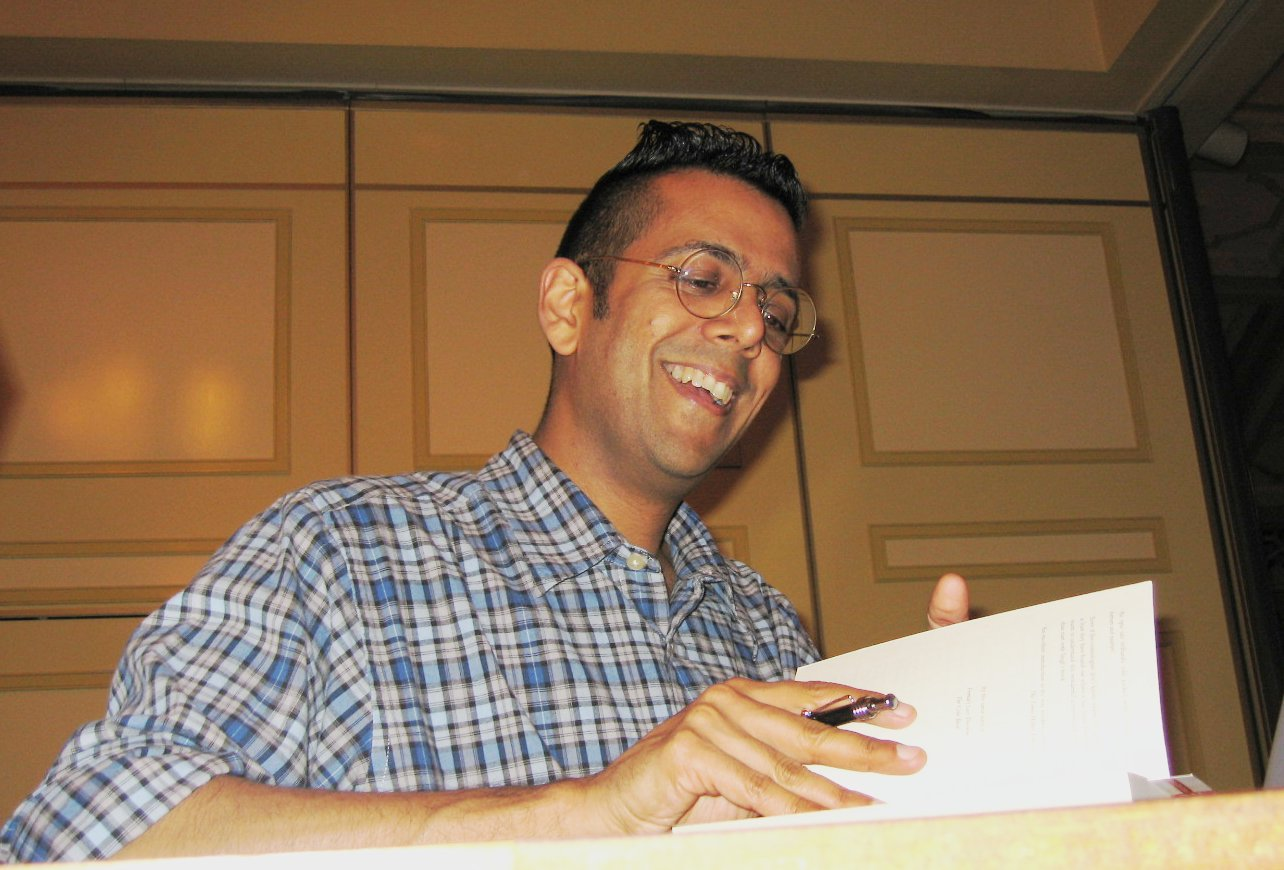
Singh signing a book for a fan, Brisbane, 23 May 2005

After attending some of Wiseman's lectures, Singh came up with the idea to create a show together, and Theatre of Science was born. It was a way to deliver science to normal people in an entertaining manner. Richard Wiseman has influenced Singh in such a way that Singh states:

My writing initially was about pure science but a lot of my research now has been inspired by his desire to debunk things such as the paranormal – we both hate psychics, mediums, pseudoscience in general.

Singh directed his BAFTA award-winning documentary about the world's most notorious mathematical problem entitled Fermat's Last Theorem in 1996. The film was memorable for its opening shot of a middle-aged mathematician, Andrew Wiles, holding back tears as he recalled the moment when he finally realised how to resolve the fundamental error in his proof of Fermat's Last Theorem. The documentary was originally transmitted in January 1996 as an edition of the BBC Horizon series. It was also aired in America as part of the NOVA series. The Proof, as it was re-titled, was nominated for an Emmy Award.

The story of this celebrated mathematical problem was also the subject of Singh's first book, Fermat's Last Theorem. In 1997, he began working on his second book, The Code Book, a history of codes and codebreaking. As well as explaining the science of codes and describing the impact of cryptography on history, the book also contends that cryptography is more important today than ever before. The Code Book has resulted in a return to television for Singh. He presented The Science of Secrecy, a five-part series for Channel 4. The stories in the series range from the cipher that sealed the fate of Mary, Queen of Scots, to the coded Zimmermann Telegram that changed the course of the First World War. Other programmes discuss how two great 19th-century geniuses raced to decipher Egyptian hieroglyphs and how modern encryption can guarantee privacy on the Internet.

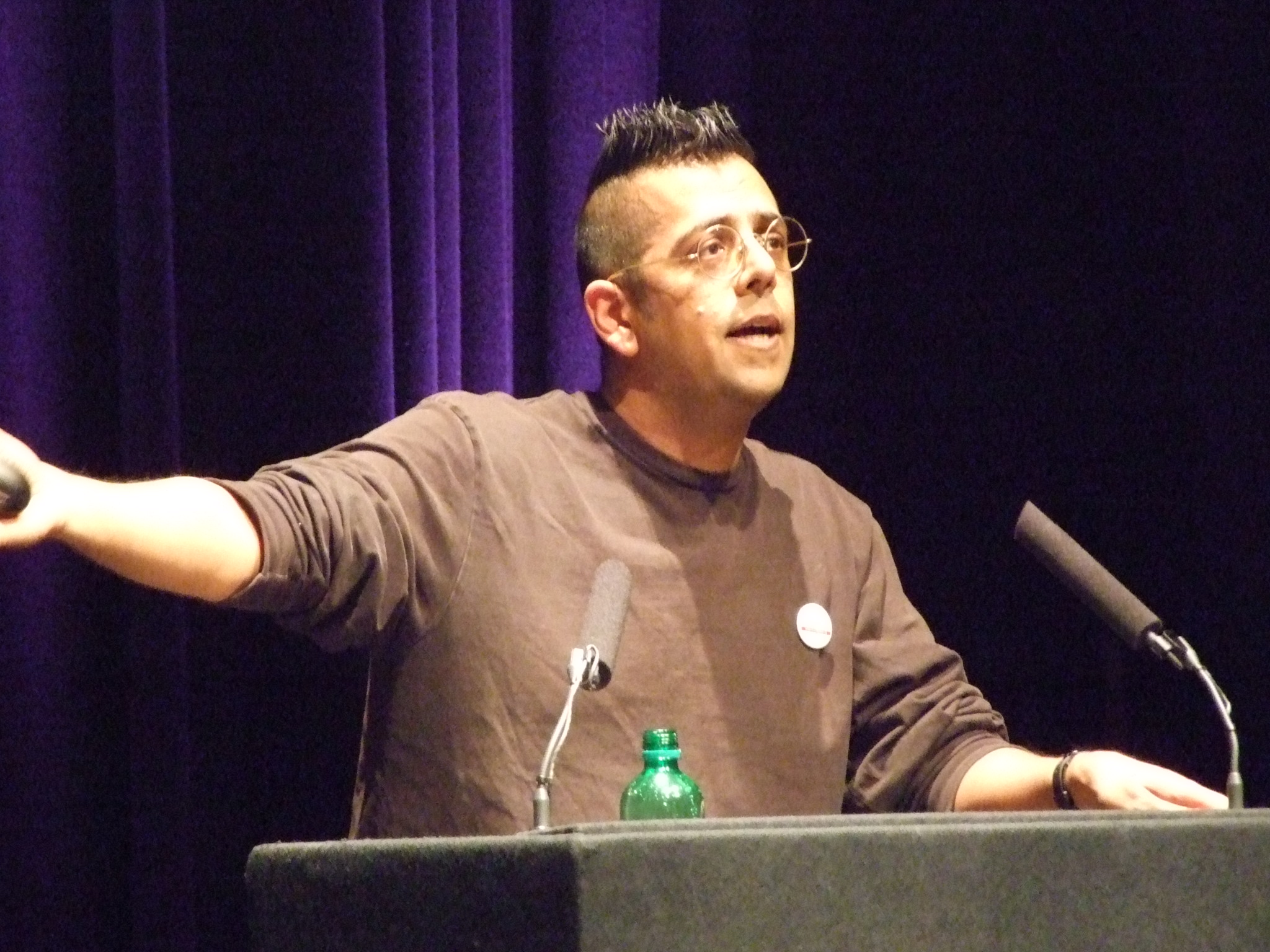
Singh speaking at TAM London in October 2009

On his activities as author he said in an interview to Imperial College London:

When I finished my PhD, I knew I wasn't exceptionally good and would never get the Nobel prize. As a kid, I wanted to be a footballer then a commentator. If I couldn't be a physicist, I'd write about it.

In October 2004, Singh published a book entitled Big Bang, which tells the history of the universe. It is told in his trademark style, by following the remarkable stories of the people who put the pieces together.

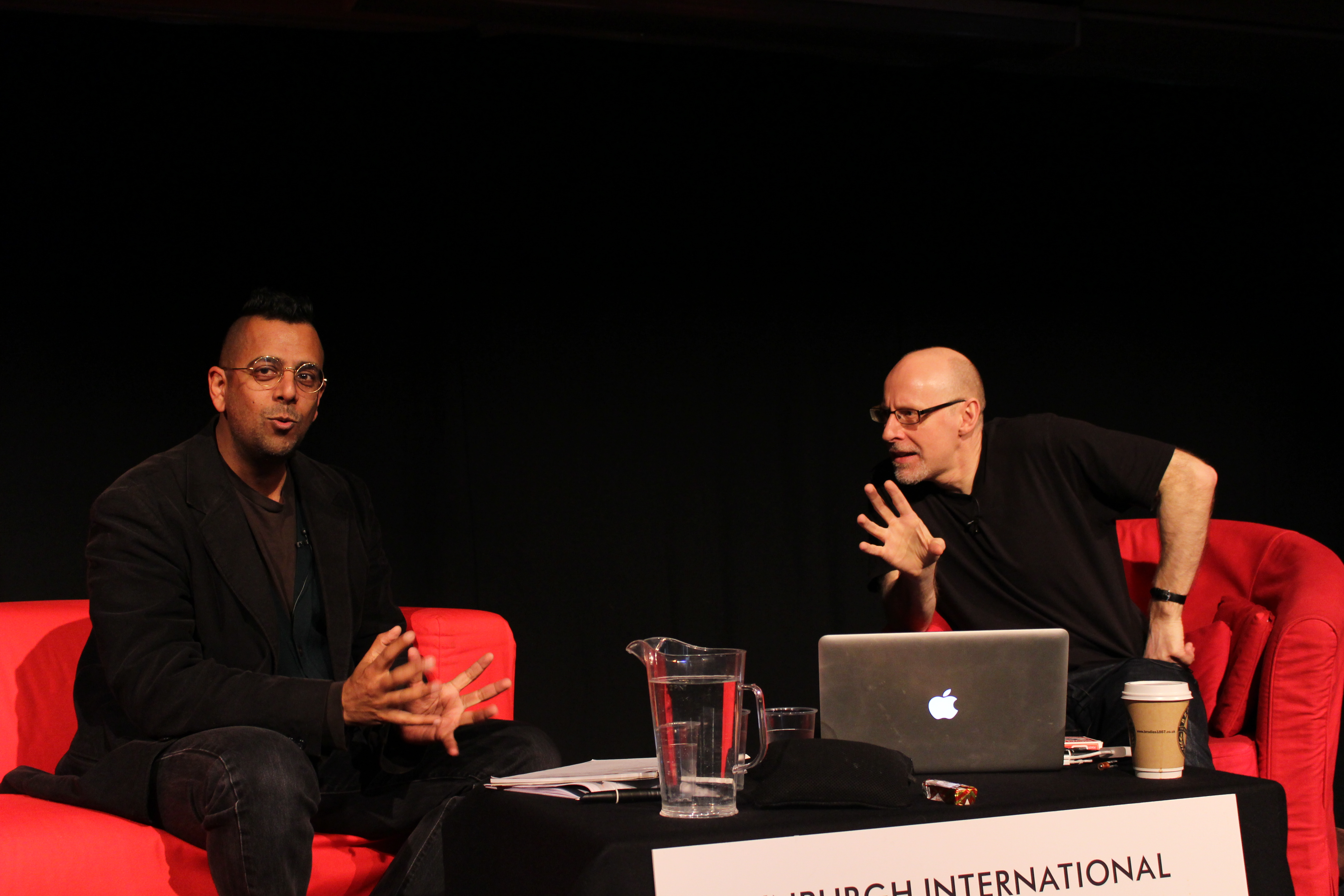
Singh speaks to Richard Wiseman on the Edinburgh International Science Festival (2014)

He made headlines in 2005 when he criticised the Katie Melua song "Nine Million Bicycles" for inaccurate lyrics referring to the size of the observable universe. Singh proposed corrected lyrics, though he used the value of 13.7 billion light years; accounting for expansion of the universe, the comoving distance to the edge of the observable universe is 46.5 billion light years. BBC Radio 4's Today programme brought Melua and Singh together in a radio studio where Melua recorded a tongue-in-cheek version of the song that had been written by Singh.

Singh was part of an investigation about homeopathy in 2006. This investigation was made by the organization Sense about Science. In the investigation, a student asked ten homeopaths for an alternative to her preventive malaria medication. All ten homeopaths recommended homeopathy as a substitute. This investigation was reported by the BBC.

Singh is a member of the Advisory Council for the Campaign for Science and Engineering.

Singh has been involved in television and radio programmes, including Five Numbers (BBC Radio 4, 11 March 2002 to 20 September 2005).

== Honorary degrees ==
In 2003, Singh was awarded an honorary degree of Doctor of Letters (honoris causa) by Loughborough University, and in 2005 was given an honorary degree in mathematics by the University of Southampton.

In 2006, he was awarded an honorary Doctor of Design degree by the University of the West of England "in recognition of Simon Singh's outstanding contribution to the public understanding of science, in particular in the promotion of science, engineering and mathematics in schools and in the building of links between universities and schools". This was followed up by his receipt of the Kelvin Medal from the Institute of Physics in 2008, for his achievements in promoting Physics to the general public. In July 2008, he was also awarded a degree of Doctor of Science (Honoris Causa) by Royal Holloway, University of London.

In July 2011, he was awarded another degree of Doctor of Science (Honoris Causa) by the University of Kent at Canterbury for services to Science. In June 2012, Singh was awarded the Honorary Degree of Doctor of Science (honoris causa) for his contribution to science communication, education and academic freedom by The University of St Andrews.

== Other awards and honours ==
In 2003, Singh was appointed a Member of the Order of the British Empire (MBE) for services to science, technology and engineering in education and science communication.

In 2010, he became the inaugural recipient of the Lilavati Award.

In February 2011, Singhwas elected as a Fellow of the Committee for Skeptical Inquiry.

Singh was awarded the 2022 IMA-LMS Christopher Zeeman Medal in recognition of his "excellence in the communication of mathematics". The award citation mentioned his work in television, his published books, and his work in mathematics education.

== Chiropractic lawsuit ==
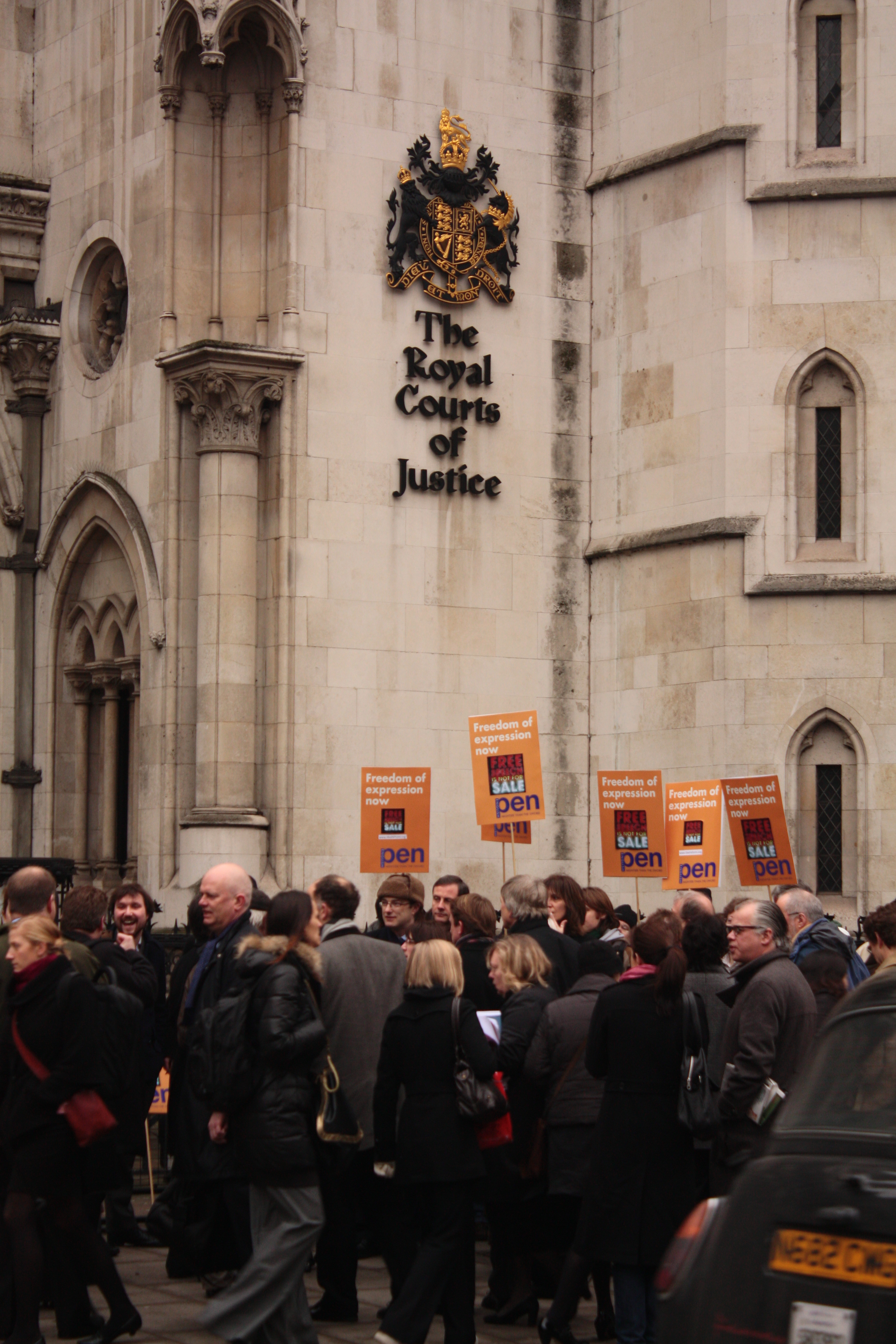
Protest before the Royal Courts of Justice on the Strand, central London

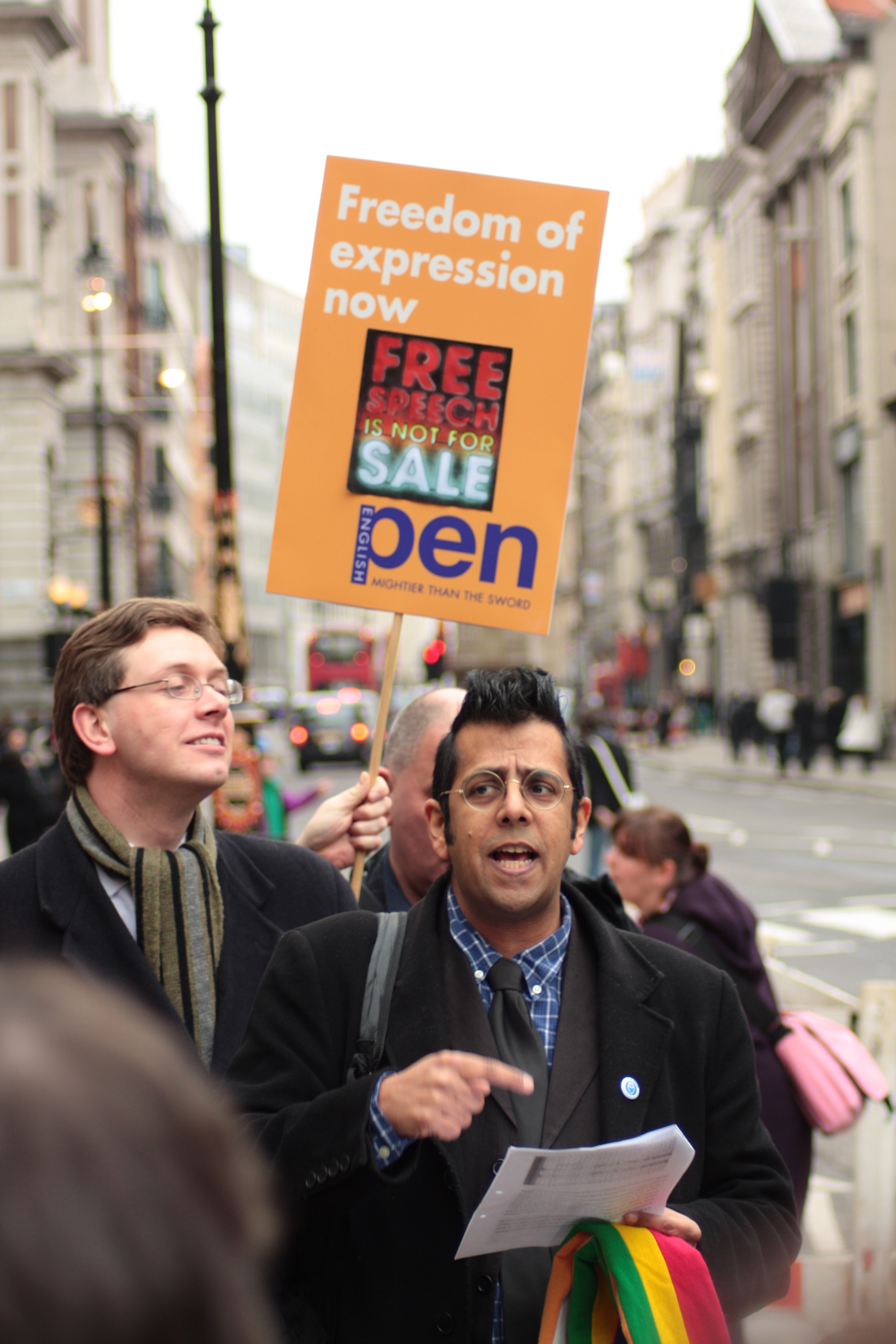
Singh approaches The Royal Courts of Justice

On 19 April 2008, The Guardian published Singh's column "Beware the Spinal Trap", an article that was critical of the practice of chiropractic and which resulted in Singh being sued for libel by the British Chiropractic Association (BCA). The article developed the theme of the book that Singh and Edzard Ernst had published, Trick or Treatment? Alternative Medicine on Trial, and made various statements about the lack of usefulness of chiropractic "for such problems as ear infections and infant colic":

You might think that modern chiropractors restrict themselves to treating back problems, but in fact they still possess some quite wacky ideas. The fundamentalists argue that they can cure anything. And even the more moderate chiropractors have ideas above their station. The British Chiropractic Association claims that their members can help treat children with colic, sleeping and feeding problems, frequent ear infections, asthma and prolonged crying, even though there is not a jot of evidence. This organisation is the respectable face of the chiropractic profession and yet it happily promotes bogus treatments.

When the case was brought against him, The Guardian supported him and funded his legal advice, as well as offering to pay the BCA's legal costs in an out-of-court settlement if Singh chose to settle. A "furious backlash" to the lawsuit resulted in the filing of formal complaints of false advertising against more than 500 individual chiropractors within one 24-hour period, with one national chiropractic organisation ordering its members to take down their websites, and Nature Medicine noting that the case had gathered wide support for Singh, as well as prompting calls for the reform of English libel laws. On 1 April 2010, Simon Singh won his court appeal for the right to rely on the defence of fair comment. On 15 April 2010, the BCA officially withdrew its lawsuit, ending the case.

To defend himself for the libel suit, Singh's out-of-pocket legal costs were tens of thousands of pounds. The trial acted as a catalyst. The outrage over the initial ruling brought together several groups to support Singh and acted as a focus for libel reform campaigners, resulting in all major parties in the 2010 general election making manifesto commitments to libel reform.

On 25 April 2013, the Defamation Act 2013 received Royal Assent and became law. The purpose of the reformed law of defamation is to 'ensure that a fair balance is struck between the right to freedom of expression and the protection of reputation'. Under the new law, claimants must show that they suffer serious harm before the court will accept the case. Additional protection for website operators, defence of 'responsible publication on matters of public interest' and new statutory defences of truth and honest opinion are also part of the key areas of the new law.

== Publications ==
- Fermat's Last Theorem (1997) – the theorem's initial conjecture and eventual proof
- The Code Book (1999) – a history of cryptography – ISBN 978-1857028799
- Big Bang (2004) – discusses models for the origin of the universe – ISBN 0007193823
- Trick or Treatment?: Alternative Medicine on Trial (2008) (with Edzard Ernst) – examines various types of alternative medicine, finds lack of evidence – ISBN 0593061292
- The Simpsons and Their Mathematical Secrets (2013) – highlights mathematical references in The Simpsons – ISBN 1620402777

== Personal life ==
Singh married journalist and broadcaster Anita Anand in 2007. The couple have two sons and live in Richmond, London.
