= Tom Singh =

British-Indian businessman (born 1949)

- Born: August 1949 (age 76); Punjab, India
- Education: Wellington School
- Alma mater: Aberystwyth University
- Occupation: Businessman
- Known for: Founder of New Look
- Spouse: Kuljit Kaur
- Children: 2
- Relatives: Simon Singh (brother); Anita Anand (journalist) (sister-in-law)

Tom Singh OBE (born August 1949) is a British-Indian businessman who is the founder of the New Look, a chain of high street fashion stores in the United Kingdom.

== Early life ==
Singh was born into a Sikh family, in Punjab, India who emigrated to England in 1950 when he was a baby. He was educated at Wellington School. He earned a degree in international politics and geography from the University of Wales in Aberystwyth.

== Career ==
In 1969, Singh founded the UK fashion retail chain New Look in Taunton, Somerset, starting with a loan from his parents of £5,000.

In 2019, his net worth was estimated at £340 million by The Sunday Times Rich List.

In June 2019, Singh announced his departure from New Look.

In 2020, Singh invested in Love the Sales, an online marketplace for discounted clothes.

== Honours ==
He was appointed an OBE in the New Year's Honours List December 2006.

== Philanthropy ==
He is also the principal of Rianta Philanthropy, an India-focused impact investing fund that operates the Artha Platform, an investor network.

== Personal life ==
He is married to Kuljit Kaur. They live in Weymouth, Dorset. He is the eldest brother of author and broadcaster Simon Singh.
