= Gentleman Usher of the Green Rod =

The Gentleman Usher of the Green Rod is the Gentleman Usher to the Most Ancient and Most Noble Order of the Thistle, established in 1687.

== Office holders from 1714 ==
- 1714–1761: Sir Thomas Brand
- 1762–1787: Robert Quarme
- 1787–1800: Matthew Robert Arnott
- 1800–1842: Robert Quarme the younger
- 1842–1884: Frederic Peel Round
- 1884–1895: Sir Duncan Campbell, 3rd Baronet (1856–1926)
- 1895–1917: Alan Murray, 5th Earl of Mansfield (1864–1935)
- 1917–1939: Brig.-Gen. Sir Robert Gordon Gilmour, 1st Baronet (1857–1939)
- 1939–1953: Colonel Sir North Dalrymple-Hamilton (1883–1953)
- 1953–1958: Lieut.-Col. Sir Edward Stevenson KCVO MC (1895–1958)
- 1959–1979: Lieut.-Col. Sir Reginald Graham, 3rd Baronet VC OBE (1892–1980)
- 1979–1997: Rear Admiral David Dunbar-Nasmith CB DSC (1921–1997)
- 1997–2026: Rear Admiral Christopher Hope Layman CB DSO LVO (born 1938)
- 2026–present: Katherine Grainger, Baroness Grainger DBE OLY (born 1975) (first Lady Usher)
