= The Code Book =

Book by Simon Singh

- First edition (UK)
- Author: Simon Singh
- Language: English
- Genre: Factual
- Publisher: Fourth Estate (UK); Doubleday (US)
- Publication date: 1999
- Publication place: United Kingdom
- Pages: 416 (first edition)
- ISBN: 978-1-85702-879-9
- OCLC: 59459928

The Code Book: The Science of Secrecy from Ancient Egypt to Quantum Cryptography is a book by Simon Singh, published in 1999 by Fourth Estate and Doubleday.

The Code Book describes some illustrative highlights in the history of cryptography, drawn from both of its principal branches, codes and ciphers. Thus the book's title should not be misconstrued as suggesting that the book deals only with codes, and not with ciphers; or that the book is in fact a codebook.

== Contents ==
The Code Book covers diverse historical topics including the Man in the Iron Mask, Arabic cryptography, Charles Babbage, the mechanisation of cryptography, the Enigma machine, and the decryption of Linear B and other ancient writing systems.

Later sections cover the development of public-key cryptography. Some of this material is based on interviews with participants, including persons who worked in secret at GCHQ.

The book concludes with a discussion of "Pretty Good Privacy" (PGP), quantum computing, and quantum cryptography.

The book announced a "cipher challenge" of a series of ten progressively harder ciphers, with a cash prize of £10,000, which has since been won.

The book is not footnoted but has a "Further Reading" section at the end, organized by chapter.

== See also ==
- Cipher
- Code
- Codebook

== Bibliography ==
- "Of Riddles Wrapped in Enigmas", Whitfield Diffie, The Times Higher Education Supplement, September 10, 1999, p. 25. Retrieved 2009-02-19.
- A critical review of the book: "The Code Book: The Evolution of Secrecy from Mary, Queen of Scots to Quantum Cryptography, reviewed by Jim Reeds", Jim Reeds, Notices of the American Mathematical Society, vol. 47, no. 3, March 2000, pp. 369–372. Retrieved 2009-02-19. (61 KB PDF).
