= Peter Watkins (civil servant) =

British civil servant

Peter Derek Watkins, CB, CBE (born 8 February 1959) is a civil servant who served as Director General of the Defence Academy from 2011 to 2014.

== Career ==
Educated at Strode's College in Egham and Peterhouse, Cambridge, Watkins joined the Ministry of Defence in 1980. He became Private Secretary to the Secretary of State for Defence in 2001, Command Secretary RAF Strike Command in 2004 and Director General Typhoon Programme in 2007. He went on to be Director of Operational Policy at the Ministry of Defence in 2008 and Director General of the Defence Academy in 2011.

On 8 January 2010 Watkins told the Iraq Inquiry of the complexities of the British withdrawal from Basra in 2009, saying "we should have applied the Balkans principle of in together out together".

Watkins was appointed a Companion of the Order of the Bath in the 2019 New Year Honours.

Military offices
Preceded by Andrew Graham	Director General of the Defence Academy; 2011–2014	Succeeded by Duncan Potts
