= Reginald Graham =

British army officer & businessman (1892-1980)

Lieutenant Colonel Sir Reginald Graham VC OBE
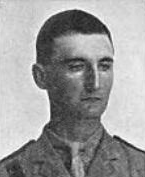
- Born: 17 September 1892; Calcutta, British India
- Died: 6 December 1980 (aged 88); Edinburgh, Scotland
- Military career
- Allegiance: United Kingdom
- Branch: British Army
- Rank: Lieutenant Colonel
- Service number: 99671
- Unit: Argyll and Sutherland Highlanders
- Conflicts: First World War; Samarra offensive; Second World War
- Awards: Victoria Cross; Officer of the Order of the British Empire; King Haakon VII's Cross of Liberty (Norway)
- Other work: Usher of the Green Rod
- Education: Eton College; Trinity College, Cambridge
- Spouse: Rachel Sprot (m. 1920)
- Children: 2
- Relatives: Sir John Graham, 4th Baronet (son); Sir Alexander Sprot, 1st Baronet (father-in-law)

Lieutenant Colonel Sir John Reginald Noble Graham, 3rd Baronet (17 September 1892 – 6 December 1980), was a British businessman, army officer and a recipient of the Victoria Cross, the highest award for gallantry in the face of the enemy that can be awarded to British and Commonwealth forces. He received the award "for most conspicuous bravery, coolness and resource when in command of a Machine Gun Section" during the Samarra offensive in 1917, during the First World War.

== Early life ==
Graham was born at Calcutta, India, on 17 September 1892, the eldest son of Sir Frederick Graham, 2nd Baronet. He was educated at Eton College and Trinity College, Cambridge.

== First World War ==
Soon after the First World War broke out, Graham joined the British Army and was posted to 9th Battalion, The Argyll and Sutherland Highlanders (Princess Louise's). In 1916 he was seconded to 136 Company, Machine Gun Corps, which was sent to Mesopotamia. During the Samarra offensive, Lieutenant Graham was in command of a machine gun section co-operating with the 56th Punjabi Rifles (Frontier Force) near Istabulat on the evening of 22 April 1917. He was awarded the Victoria Cross for his subsequent actions that night:

Lt. Graham accompanied his guns across open ground, under very heavy rifle and machine gun fire, and when his men became casualties, he assisted in carrying the ammunition.

Although twice wounded he continued during the advance to control his guns and was able, with one gun, to open an accurate fire on the enemy, who were massing for a counter-attack. This gun was put out of action by the enemy's rifle fire, and he was again wounded. The advancing enemy forced him to retire, but before doing so he further disabled his gun, rendering it useless.

He then brought a Lewis gun into action with excellent effect till all the ammunition was expended. He was again severely wounded, and forced through loss of blood to retire.

His valour and skilful handling of his guns held up a strong counter-attack which threatened to roll up the left flank of the Brigade, and thus averted what might have been a very critical situation.

After recovering from his severe wounds Captain Graham, as he had become, was ordered back to Mesopotamia where he continued to serve until January 1918, when his company was transferred to Palestine where he was given command of the unit with the rank of major.

After the war, Graham returned to Scotland to a hero's welcome at his home village of Cardross.

== Business ventures and later life ==
Graham later worked in India in branches of the family firm, William Graham and Company, founded by his great-great-grandfather in Glasgow.

In 1920 Graham married Rachel Sprot, daughter of Sir Alexander Sprot, 1st Baronet. They had one son (who inherited the baronetcy as Sir John Graham, 4th Baronet) and one daughter, Lesley, who married Jock Wykeham Strang Steel.

Memorial Stone at Cardross

Graham succeeded to the baronetcy on the death of his father in 1936. During the Second World War, he was given a temporary rank of lieutenant colonel and served in Scottish Command. He was appointed an Officer of the Order of the British Empire in the 1946 New Year Honours, and awarded King Haakon VII's Cross of Liberty in 1949.

From 1959 to 1979 Graham was Usher of the Green Rod to the Order of the Thistle, and participated in many state occasions including the unveiling of a memorial to King George VI in St Giles' Cathedral, Edinburgh in 1962. He died aged 88 in Edinburgh. He was cremated at Mortonhall Crematorium.

Lady Graham died in 1984.

== Memorials ==
Graham's medals are held by the Argyll and Sutherland Highlanders Museum in Stirling Castle on loan from the family.

Reginald Graham's Commemorative Memorial Stone was unveiled at the Cardross War Memorial on 22 April 2017, the 100th anniversary of his gallant action. There is a second Commemorative Memorial Stone to him in the National Memorial Arboretum along with Memorial Stones for all the other VCs who were born abroad.

== Honours ==
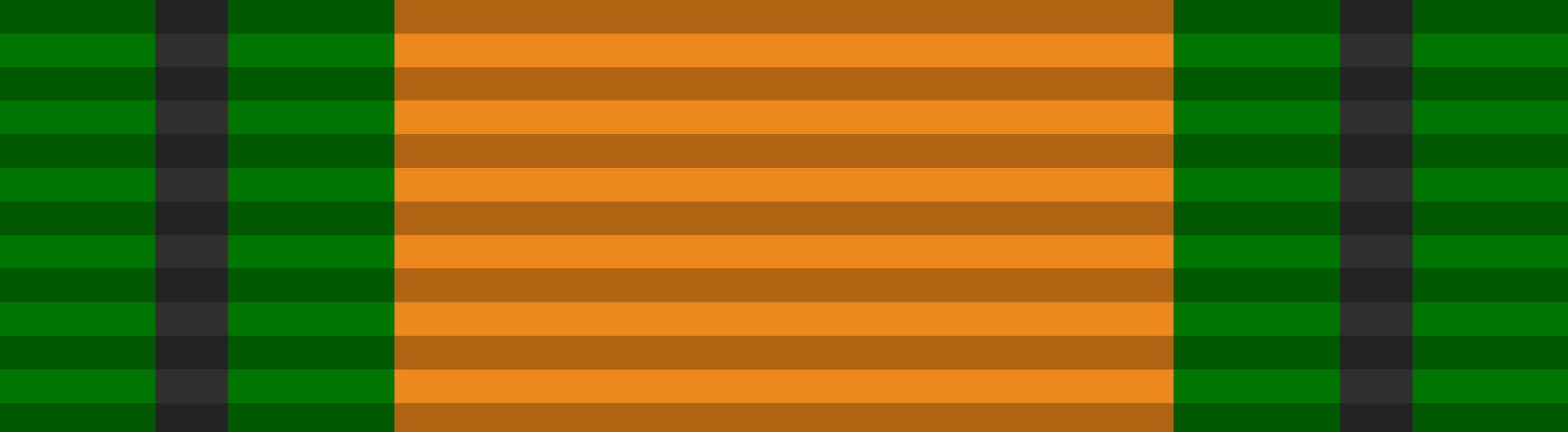

Ribbon	Description	Notes
	Victoria Cross (VC)	14 September 1917
	Order of the British Empire (OBE)	Officer; Military Division; 1946 New Years Honours List
	Baronetcy (Bt)	3rd Baronet of Larbert House and Househill; Inherited in 1936
	British War Medal	26 July 1919
	WWI Victory Medal	1 September 1919
	Defence Medal	
	War Medal	
	King George V Silver Jubilee Medal	6 May 1935
	King George VI Coronation Medal	12 May 1937
	Queen Elizabeth II Coronation Medal	2 June 1953
	Queen Elizabeth II Silver Jubilee Medal	6 February 1977; UK Version of this Medal
	King Haakon VII Freedom Cross	25 March 1949

Baronetage of the United Kingdom
Preceded by Frederick Graham	Baronet of Larbert; 1936–1980	Succeeded by John Graham
