= Graham baronets of Larbert House and Househill (1906) =

Escutcheon of the Graham baronets of Larbert House and Househill

The Graham baronetcy, of Larbert House in Larbert and of Househill in Dunipace in the County of Stirling, was created in the Baronetage of the United Kingdom on 4 December 1906 for John Graham, a Glasgow merchant.

The 3rd Baronet was Lieutenant-Colonel Sir Reginald Graham, VC. Sir John Graham, 4th Baronet was Ambassador to Iraq from 1974 to 1977 and Iran from 1979 to 1980. His son Sir Andrew Graham, 5th Baronet is a lieutenant general who was Director General of the Defence Academy of the United Kingdom from 2008 to 2011.

== Graham baronets, of Larbert House and Househill (1906) ==
- Sir John Hatt Noble Graham, 1st Baronet (1837–1926)
- Sir (John) Frederick Noble Graham, 2nd Baronet (1864–1936)
- Sir John Reginald Noble Graham, 3rd Baronet (1892–1980)
- Sir John Alexander Noble Graham, 4th Baronet (1926–2019)
- Sir Andrew John Noble Graham, 5th Baronet (born 1956)

The heir apparent is the present holder's son James Patrick Noble Graham (born 1990).

== Notes ==
Baronetage of the United Kingdom
Preceded by Channing baronets	Graham baronets of Larbert House and Househill; 4 December 1906	Succeeded by Hughes-Hunter baronets
