= Fermat's Last Theorem (book) =

Non-fiction book by Simon Singh

- First edition
- Author: Simon Singh
- Language: English
- Subject: Fermat's Last Theorem
- Genre: Non-fiction
- Publisher: Fourth Estate
- Publication date: 1997
- Media type: Print (hardcover, paperback)
- ISBN: 978-1857025217

Fermat's Last Theorem is a popular science book (1997) by Simon Singh. It tells the story of the search for a proof of Fermat's Last Theorem, first conjectured by Pierre de Fermat in 1637, and explores how many mathematicians such as Évariste Galois had tried and failed to provide a proof for the theorem. Despite the efforts of many mathematicians, the proof would remain incomplete until 1995, with the publication of Andrew Wiles' proof of the Theorem. The book is the first mathematics book to become a Number One seller in the United Kingdom, whilst Singh's documentary The Proof, on which the book was based, won a BAFTA in 1997.

In the United States, the book was released as Fermat's Enigma: The Epic Quest to Solve the World's Greatest Mathematical Problem. The book was released in the United States in October 1998 to coincide with the US release of Singh's documentary The Proof about Wiles's proof of Fermat's Last Theorem.
