= New Look (company) =

British fashion retailer

New Look Retailers Ltd
- Type: Private limited company
- Industry: Retail
- Founded: 1969; 57 years ago Taunton, Somerset, UK
- Founder: Tom Singh
- Headquarters: Weymouth, Dorset, United Kingdom: (Corporate Services); London, United Kingdom: (Creative, Digital and Productive departments)
- Number of locations: 826 (2018)
- Area served: Worldwide
- Key people: Mike Coupe (Chairman); Helen Connolly (CEO); Richard Collyer (CFO)
- Products: Clothing
- Revenue: ▼GBP £1,347.8 million (2018)
- Operating income: ▼GBP £(152.5) million (2018)
- Net income: ▼GBP £(223.8) million (2018)
- Owner: Brait SA
- Website: www.newlook.com/uk

New Look is a British global fashion retailer with a chain of high street shops. It was founded in 1969. The chain sells womenswear, menswear, and clothing for teens. New Look was owned by private equity groups Apax Partners and Permira, and founder Tom Singh, until May 2015 when it was acquired by Brait SE (SA) for £780 million.

== History ==
New Look was founded by Tom Singh in Taunton, Somerset, in 1969. Since then the company has expanded and previously operated across a chain of over 900 shops internationally, having opened in Ireland in 2003.

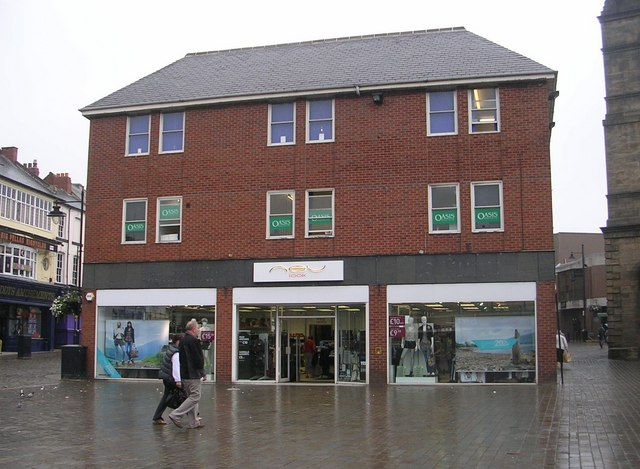
New Look, Pontefract

In 2004, the company withdrew from the stock market and was taken back to being a privately owned business by founder Tom Singh and chief executive Phil Wrigley, and private equity investors Permira, Apax Partners and Quillian Investments.

On 26 April 2007, a fire occurred at a New Look branch in Oxford Street, London. The subsequent investigation revealed an extensive catalogue of failings relating to fire safety precautions and measures. The company subsequently pleaded guilty to criminal charges and on 25 November 2009, was fined a total of £400,000 with £136,052 costs. In 2010, the fines were upheld by the Court of Appeal.

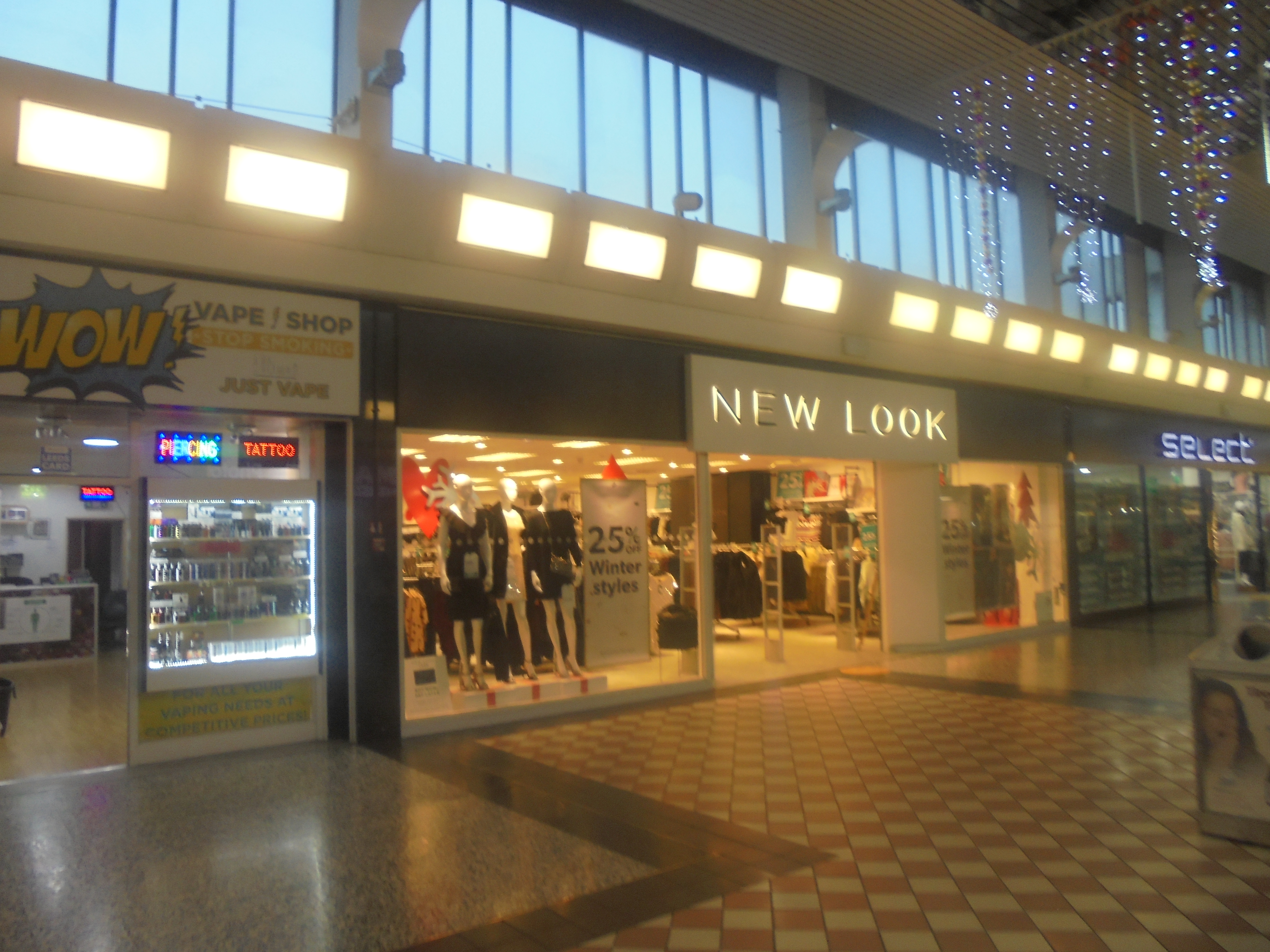
New look in the current branding and revive refit in Cross Gates, Leeds in 2019.

In February 2009, the company's fortieth anniversary year, New Look opened their first shop in Russia.

The largest New Look shop in the world opened in Dublin, Ireland on 4 November 2010, located at the Jervis Shopping Centre.

In 2015, New Look was purchased by Brait SE; had 94 shops in China, and 852 globally.

In June 2017, New Look launched their "My Life My Style My Look" campaign and made history when they announced British model Georgie Aldous as their first ever male model in a full face of make-up.

In 2018, New Look closed 60 shops in the United Kingdom and withdrew from international markets. In 2020, as a result of the COVID-19 pandemic, New Look filed for Chapter 15 bankruptcy in the United States.

In February 2025, the High Court of Ireland appointed provisional liquidators to New Look's Irish operations after substantial losses over the previous four years. On 20 February 2025, it was announced that New Look was to exit the Irish market. The company was criticised in late February 2025 for refusing to accept its own gift vouchers during its closing-down sale.
