= Brooke (charity) =

UK-based international equine charity

- Formation: Cairo, 1934
- Legal status: Charity
- Headquarters: Blackfriars Road, London, SE1
- Region served: Afghanistan, Burkina Faso, Egypt, Ethiopia, Guatemala, India, Kenya, Mexico, Nepal, Nicaragua, Pakistan, Senegal
- Founder: Dorothy Brooke
- Staff: 451
- Website: www.thebrooke.org

Brooke is a United Kingdom-based international equine charity, which focuses on the welfare and care of donkeys, horses and mules. With more than 900 people working helping to deliver services, Brooke is the largest equine charity in the world.

Formerly known as Brooke Hospital for Animals, the charity rebranded in May 2016 to Brooke – Action for Working Horses and Donkeys.

The then Duchess of Cornwall became the charity's President in 2006. Olympic dressage champion Charlotte Dujardin became the charity's Global Ambassador in 2015 but Brooke cut ties with her in July 2024 after she was put under investigation for alleged animal cruelty.

Other supporters include deceased horse racing commentator Sir Peter O'Sullevan who was Patron at the time of his death, and present Patrons Alastair Stewart and Princess Alia of Jordan.

== History ==
In 1930, while on a trip to Cairo, Egypt, Mrs. Dorothy Brooke encountered thousands of ex-cavalry horses being used as beasts of burden. She was shocked to see that these horses which had served the British army during World War I were now living a life of gruelling hardship on the streets of Cairo.

On her return to England she wrote a letter to The Morning Post newspaper (now known as The Daily Telegraph), exposing their plight and appealing for funds to help her save them. The public response was overwhelming, and they donated the equivalent today of £20,000 to help. In 1933, Mrs. Brooke set up a committee to help fund the purchase of 5,000 animals, most of which due to their health were humanely destroyed.

In 1934, she established the Old War Horse Memorial Hospital to provide a free veterinary clinic for all the working horses and donkeys of Cairo. The original hospital which Mrs. Brooke established in Bayram ElTonsi Street, now known locally as "The Street of the English Lady," is still open and operating.

== Operations ==
Brooke works across Africa, Asia, the Middle East and Central America: Afghanistan, Burkina Faso, Egypt, Ethiopia, Guatemala, India, Kenya, Mexico, Nepal, Nicaragua, Pakistan and Senegal. They also have fundraising offices in the United States and the Netherlands alongside the charity headquarters in the United Kingdom. In 2016–2017, the charity reached over two million horses, donkeys and mules. For 600 million people in some of the poorest places in the world, 100 million of these animals are a vital part of communities and their best means of making a living. Healthy working horses, donkeys and mules are essential for families in many poor countries.

Brooke's work focuses on developing the skills and compassion of the people who use horses, donkeys and mules in their daily lives. Brooke works with owners, communities and local governments to bring about lasting improvements to the lives of these animals. They train and support local vets, farriers, harness makers and animal traders to improve standards of care.

== Research ==
Brooke's policy research allows them to make substantiated claims about the essential role of working equines in sustaining the livelihoods of their owners and the importance of their welfare for the benefit of people.

Brooke's previous research reports include 'Invisible Workers', looking at the economic contribution of working donkeys, horses and mules to livelihood, and 'Voices From Women', examining women's views on the contributions of working equines to their lives.

== See also ==
- Animal welfare in the United Kingdom
- Animal welfare in Egypt
