= Popular mathematics =

Mathematics for a general audience

Popular mathematics is mathematical presentation aimed at a general audience. Sometimes this is in the form of books which require no mathematical background and in other cases it is in the form of expository articles written by professional mathematicians to reach out to others working in different areas. It also includes television and film works, as well as museum exhibits. To an extent, it overlaps with recreational mathematics, which is mathematical activity done for entertainment purposes.

== Notable works of popular mathematics ==
Some of the most prolific popularisers of mathematics include Keith Devlin, Martin Gardner, and Ian Stewart. Titles by these three authors can be found on their respective pages.

=== On infinity ===
- Rózsa Péter (1961). Playing with Infinity: Mathematical Explorations and Excursions. Simon & Schuster.
- Rucker, Rudy (1982), Infinity and the Mind: The Science and Philosophy of the Infinite; Princeton, N.J.: Princeton University Press. ISBN 978-0-691-00172-2.
- Eugenia Cheng (2017). Beyond Infinity: An Expedition to the Outer Limits of Mathematics. Basic Books. ISBN 978-0-465094813.

=== On constants ===
- Petr Beckmann (1976). A History of Pi. Saint Martin's Press. ISBN 978-0-312-38185-1.
- Charles Seife (2000). Zero: The Biography of a Dangerous Idea. Viking. ISBN 978-0670884575.
- David Wells (1986). The Penguin Dictionary of Curious and Interesting Numbers. Penguin Books. ISBN 0-14-008029-5.

=== On the Riemann hypothesis ===
- John Derbyshire (2004). Prime Obsession. Plume Books. ISBN 978-0-452-28525-5.
- Marcus du Sautoy (2003). The Music of the Primes: Searching to Solve the Greatest Mystery in Mathematics. Harper Collins. ISBN 0-06-093558-8.

=== On recently solved problems ===
- Simon Singh (2002). Fermat's Last Theorem. Fourth Estate. ISBN 1-84115-791-0.

=== On higher dimensions ===
- Rucker, Rudy (1984), The Fourth Dimension: Toward a Geometry of Higher Reality; Houghton Mifflin Harcourt.

=== On erroneous mathematics ===
- Underwood Dudley (1992). Mathematical Cranks. Mathematical Association of America. ISBN 0-88385-507-0.
- John Allen Paulos (1998). Innumeracy: Mathematical Illiteracy and its Consequences. Hill and Wang. ISBN 0-8090-7447-8.

=== On introduction to mathematics for the general reader ===
- Eugenia Cheng (2015). How to Bake Pi. Basic Books. ISBN 978-0-465-05171-7.
- Richard Courant and Herbert Robbins (1941). What is Mathematics?: An Elementary Approach to Ideas and Methods. London: Oxford University Press.

=== On mathematics and culture ===
- William Goldbloom Bloch (2008). The Unimaginable Mathematics of Borges' Library of Babel. Oxford University Press. ISBN 9780195334579.
- Doris Schattschneider (1990). M. C. Escher: Visions of Symmetry. W. H. Freeman.
- Simon Singh (2013). The Simpsons and Their Mathematical Secrets. Bloomsbury.
- Jessica Wynne (2021). Do Not Erase: Mathematicians and Their Chalkboards. Princeton University Press. ISBN 978-0-69119-922-1.

=== Biographies ===
- Paul Hoffman (1998). The Man Who Loved Only Numbers. Fourth Estate. ISBN 1-85702-811-2.
- Robert Kanigel (1991). The Man Who Knew Infinity: A Life of the Genius Ramanujan. Washington Square Press. ISBN 0-671-75061-5.
- Siobhan Roberts (2006). King of Infinite Space: Donald Coxeter, the Man Who Saved Geometry. Walker Books. ISBN 0-887-84201-1.

== Magazines and journals ==
- Popular science magazines such as New Scientist and Scientific American sometimes carry articles on mathematics.
- Plus Magazine is a free online magazine run under the Millennium Mathematics Project at the University of Cambridge.

The journals listed below can be found in many university libraries.

- American Mathematical Monthly is designed to be accessible to a wide audience.
- The Mathematical Gazette contains letters, book reviews and expositions of attractive areas of mathematics.
- Mathematics Magazine offers exposition on a wide range of mathematical topics.
- The Mathematical Intelligencer is a mathematical journal that aims at a conversational and scholarly tone.
- Notices of the AMS - Each issue contains one or two expository articles that describe current developments in mathematical research, written by professional mathematicians. The Notices also carries articles on the history of mathematics, mathematics education, and professional issues facing mathematicians, as well as reviews of books, plays, movies, and other artistic and cultural works involving mathematics.

== Audio and video ==
- 3Blue1Brown, YouTube channel by Grant Sanderson.
- Mathologer, YouTube channel by Burkard Polster.
- Numberphile, YouTube channel by Brady Haran.

== Museums ==
Several museums aim at enhancing public understanding of mathematics:

In the United States:

- Museum of Mathematics, New York, and its predecessor, the Goudreau Museum of Mathematics in Art and Science,

In Austria:

- Haus der Mathematik, Wien

In Germany:

- Arithmeum, Bonn
- Mathematisch-Physikalischer Salon, Dresden
- Mathematikum, Gießen
- Experiminta, Frankfurt on Main
- Virtuelles Freiberger Museum für Mathematik und Kunst, Freiberg
- MiMa Mineralien- und Mathematikmuseum, Oberwolfach

In Italy:

- The Garden of Archimedes
