= The Unimaginable Mathematics of Borges' Library of Babel =

Popular mathematics book

- Author: William Goldbloom Bloch
- Language: English
- Subject: The Library of Babel by Jorge Luis Borges
- Publisher: Oxford University Press
- Publication date: 2008
- ISBN: 9780195334579

The Unimaginable Mathematics of Borges' Library of Babel is a popular mathematics book on Jorge Luis Borges and mathematics. It describes several mathematical concepts related to the short story "The Library of Babel" by Jorge Luis Borges. Written by mathematics professor William Goldbloom Bloch, and published in 2008 by the Oxford University Press, it received an honorable mention in the 2008 PROSE Awards.

== Topics ==
"The Library of Babel" was originally written by Borges in 1941, based on an earlier essay he had published in 1939 while working as a librarian. It concerns a fictional library containing every possible book of a certain fixed length, over a 25-symbol alphabet (which, including spacing and punctuation, is sufficient for the Spanish language). These assumptions, based on the dimensions of his own library and spelled out in more detail in the story, imply that the total number of books in the library is 25^{1312000}, an enormous number with 1,834,098 digits. The story also describes, with an attitude of some horror, the physical layout of the library that holds all of these books, and some of the behavior of its inhabitants.

After a copy of "The Library of Babel" itself, as translated into English by Andrew Hurley, The Unimaginable Mathematics of Borges' Library of Babel has seven chapters on its mathematics. The first chapter, on combinatorics, repeats the calculation above, of the number of books in the library, putting it in context with the size of the known universe and with other huge numbers, and uses this material as an excuse to branch off into a discussion of logarithms and their use in estimation. The second chapter concerns a line in the story about the existence of a library catalog for the library, using information theory to prove that such a catalog would necessarily equal in size the library itself, and touching on topics including the prime number theorem. The third chapter considers the mathematics of the infinite, and the possibility of books with infinitely many, infinitely thin pages, connecting these topics both to a footnote in "The Library of Babel" and to another Borges story, "The Book of Sand", about such an infinite book.

Chapters four and five concern the architecture of the library, described as a set of interconnected hexagonal rooms, exploring the possibilities for their connections in terms of geometry, topology, and graph theory. They also use mathematics to deduce unexpected conclusions about the library's structure: it must have at least one room whose shelves are not full (because the number of books per room does not divide the total number of books evenly), and the rooms on each floor of the library must either be connected into a single Hamiltonian cycle, or possibly be disconnected into subsets that cannot reach each other. Chapter six considers the ways the books might be distributed through these rooms, and chapter seven views the library and its interactions with its inhabitants as analogous to Turing machines. A concluding chapter provides references to the literature on the story, critiques the scholarship on this story from the point of view of its mathematics, and discusses how much of this mathematics might have been familiar to Borges.

Author William Bloch, a mathematics professor at Wheaton College (Massachusetts), says that his book was originally intended as a short paper, based on his research from a sabbatical visit to Borges's home city Buenos Aires, but that it "grew and grew and grew". The endpapers of the book are decorated with reproductions of Borges's original manuscript for his story.

== Audience and reception ==
Reading The Unimaginable Mathematics of Borges' Library of Babel requires only high-school mathematics, and its chapters are independent of each other and can be read in any order. Although written for a popular audience, it has enough depth of content to interest professional mathematicians as well.

The book's reviewers point to some minor issues with the book, including a too-facile derivation of the (correct) conclusion that an index for the library would be as large as the library itself, a miscalculation of the number of permutations of books that are possible, a missed easy explanation of logarithms as approximating the number of digits in a number, an incorrect statement that a book with infinitely many infinitely thin pages would necessarily itself be infinitely thin, the choice for an example of a letter that does not appear in Borges's descriptions, and a failure to address the Spanish-language literature on Borges's work.

Nevertheless, reviewer James V. Rauff calls it "a treat for anyone with a passion for infinity, logic, language, and the philosophy of mathematics". And reviewer Dan King, who himself has taught the mathematics of Borges's writing, writes that the book is "as eloquent and provocative as Borges’ story itself", and a must-read for all fans of Borges.
