= Du Sautoy =

du Sautoy is a surname. Notable people with the surname include:

- Carmen du Sautoy (born 1950), British actress
- Peter du Sautoy (1912–1995), British publisher
- Marcus du Sautoy (born 1965), British mathematician
