= Steven L. Peck bibliography =

List of works by Steven L. Peck

This is a list of literary works by American author and evolutionary biologist Steven L. Peck.

== Fiction ==
=== Novels and short story collections ===
Title	Type of publication	Time of first publication	Publisher of first edition	Unique identifier	Full text link	Citation
The Gift of the King's Jeweler	Novella	2003	Covenant Communications	ISBN 9781591562771	archive.org	
The Scholar of Moab	Novel	2011	Torey House Press	ISBN 9781937226022		
The Rifts of Rime	Novel	2012	Sweetwater Books.	ISBN 9781599559674		
A Short Stay in Hell	Novella	2012	Strange Violin Editions	ISBN 9780983748427		
Gilda Trillim: Shepherdess of Rats	Novel	2017	Roundfire Books	ISBN 9781782798644		
The Tragedy of King Leere, Goathered of the La Sals	Novel	2019	BCC Press	ISBN 978-1948218016		
Wandering Realities: Mormonish Short Fiction	Collection	2015	Zarahemla Books	ISBN 978-0988323346		
Tales from Pleasant Grove	Collection	2018	self-published	ISBN 9781986604239		
Heike's Void	Novel	2022	BCC Press	ISBN 9781948218559		

=== Short stories ===
This list does not include stories that were first published in Wandering Realities or Tales from Pleasant Grove. "The Problem" won an honorable mention in the 2010 Brookie and D.K. Brown fiction contest and was first published in Wandering Realities.

Title	Time of first publication	Publication	Notes	Full text link	Citation
"Water, Mud, and Insects"	1995	The Friend		churchofjesuschrist.org	
"The Flaw in the Lord Harrington Scenario"	2002	HMS Beagle			
"The Parable of the Peccary"	2008	By Common Consent		By Common Consent	
"Let the Mountains Tremble for Adoniha Has Fallen"	2011	Monsters and Mormons (anthology)	collected in Wandering Realities		
"Stratton Yellows"	2011	Warp and Weave	won first place in the Warp and Weave science fiction competition		
"Question Four"	2012	Jabberwocky	collected in Wandering Realities	Jabberwocky	
"A Classical Haunting"	2012	Lissette's Tales of Imagination #5			
"Do I Tell Her?"	2012	Daily Science Fiction		Daily Science Fiction	
"Dragonfly Miscalculations"	2012	The Journal of Unlikely Etymology		web.archive.org	
"Avek, Who Is Distributed"	2012	Mormon Lit Blitz	Collected in Wandering Realities. Also collected in Mormon Lit Blitz Anthology: Volume 1: The First Five Years 2012–2016	Mormon Lit Blitz	.
"When the Bishop Started Killing Dogs"	2012	Mormon Lit Blitz	collected in Wandering Realities and Mormon Lit Blitz Anthology: Volume 1: The First Five Years 2012–2016	lit.mormonartist.net	
Kayden Abernathy's Journal Pages 35–37 Partially Recovered from the House Fire 6/21/2013	2013	Mormon Lit Blitz	collected in Mormon Lit Blitz Anthology: Volume 1: The First Five Years 2012–2016	Mormon Midrashim	
"How the Mother of Vampiro Rojo de Santanás Died at the Hand of the Ethicless Thing"	2013	Silverthought press online		web.archive.org	
"Emergence"	2013	Encounters #5		web.archive.org	
"The Silence of the River"	2013	Quantum Realities: A Journal of Speculative Fiction 2.2			
"Plague Ship"	2013	Space Eldritch II: The Haunted Stars			
"Demode"	2013	Nature Physics		web.archive.org	
"A Strange Report From Church Archives"	2013	Irreantum	won second place in the Irreantum fiction contest; collected in Wandering Realities	web.archive.org	
"Two-Dog Dose"	2014	Dialogue	won the 2014 AML award for short fiction; collected in Wandering Realities	Dialogue	
"The Runners"	2014	Sunstone	collected in Wandering Realities	Sunstone	
"Workers Celebrate Labor Day"	2014	By Common Consent		By Common Consent	
"Pinewood Derby Unleashed"	2014	By Common Consent	collected in Wandering Realities and Tales from Pleasant Grove as "The Best Pinewood Derby Ever"	By Common Consent	
"Down Courthouse Wash"	2015	Perihelion		web.archive.org	
"Tales from Pleasant Grove"	2015	Every Day Fiction	collected in Tales from Pleasant Grove as "Jars of Fear"	web.archive.org	
"Escape of Pleasant Grove's Turkey Shoot Flock"	2015	By Common Consent	collected in Tales from Pleasant Grove as "Escape of the Turkey-Shoot Flock"	By Common Consent	
"Harbingers"	2016	Dark Lane Anthology, Volume Three			
"Incomplete Slaughter"	2016	The Colored Lens		The Colored Lens	
"Abraham and Thomas: Doubt"	2016	As Iron Sharpens Iron: Listening to the Various Voices of Scripture (anthology)			
"Bishop Johansen Rescues a Lost Soul: A Tale of Pleasant Grove"	2016	Dialogue	collected in Tales from Pleasant Grove	Dialogue	
"A Hell of a Life"	2016	Windows Into Hell (anthology)			
"At the End of the Eight Volume Epic: All I Want is a Warm Bath and a Good Scroll"	2017	The Centropic Oracle		centropicoracle.com	
"She That Withheld the Knife"	2017	Available on Kindle			
"A Strike to the Heart of the Cannon Lord"	2018	All Made of Hinges (anthology)			
"Does Plowman Heed the Mole's Cry?"	2018	Last Shot Fired: Midnight Writer's Anthology 2018 (anthology)			
"The Sacrifice"	2019	Dialogue		Dialogue	
"Angels of Pleasant Grove"	2021	A Desolating Sickness: Stories of Pandemic		A Desolating Sickness	

=== Poetry ===
Title	Time of First Publication	Publication	Comments	Full text link	Citation
"Winton Night Walks"	1988	Dialogue		JSTOR	
Fly Fishing in Middle Earth	1992	American Tolkien Society			
"The Golden Bough Breaks and Down Comes Baby, Cradle and All"	1992	Bellowing Ark	collected in Incorrect Astronomy		
"Algonquin Physics"	1992	Bellowing Ark	collected in Incorrect Astronomy		
"Reflections of Stellar Ecology"	1993	BYU Studies	collected in Incorrect Astronomy	byustudies.byu.edu	
"Advice on Correct Astronomy"	1995	BYU Studies	collected in Incorrect Astronomy	byustudies.byu.edu	
"The Antlion"	2007	Glyphs III: Poems and Stories of the Colorado Plateau	reprinted on Wilderness Interface Zone and collected in Incorrect Astronomy	Wilderness Interface Zone	
"Sage"	2008	Red Rock Review	collected in Incorrect Astronomy and Fire in the Pasture		
"The Five Known Sutras of Mechanical Man"	2010	Tales of the Talisman	collected in Incorrect Astronomy		
"Winter Gifts"	2010	Victorian Violet Press Poetry Journal	collected in Incorrect Astronomy and Fire in the Pasture		
"Bees"	2010	Creative Nonfiction	collected in Incorrect Astronomy		
"The Slaying of Trickster Gods"	November 17, 2010	Wilderness Interface Zone	collected in Incorrect Astronomy and Fire in the Pasture	web.archive.org	
"Courthouse Wash on a January Morning"	December 7, 2010	Wilderness Interface Zone	collected in Incorrect Astronomy	web.archive.org	
"Pond Ducks"	December 8, 2010	Wilderness Interface Zone	collected in Incorrect Astronomy	Wilderness Interface Zone	
"A Patchwork"	August 8, 2011	Wilderness Interface Zone	reprinted in Exponent II 31.2 and in Incorrect Astronomy	Wilderness Interface Zone	
"String Theory"	April 22, 2011	Wilderness Interface Zone	collected in Incorrect Astronomy	Wilderness Interface Zone	
"Her Father's Critique"	April 26, 2011	Wilderness Interface Zone	collected in Incorrect Astronomy	Wilderness Interface Zone	
"Bobcat"	April 29, 2011	Wilderness Interface Zone	collected in Incorrect Astronomy	Wilderness Interface Zone	
"The Complete Text of the First Ten Volumes of Dr. Fleckwain's Very, Very Short Steampunk Novels"	2011	The Pedestal Magazine	collected in Incorrect Astronomy	web.archive.org	
"Love Floats Pale and White"	2011	Fire in the Pasture: Twenty-first Century Mormon Poets (anthology)			
"Walks the Ape Warder"	May 21, 2012	Silver Blade Magazine	collected in Incorrect Astronomy	web.archive.org	
"Temptations in the Desert"	May 21, 2012	Wilderness Interface Zone		web.archive.org	
"The Steam Wolves Hunt"	March 31, 2013	Abyss & Apex		abyssapexzine.com	
Incorrect Astronomy	2013	Aldrich Press			
"As Nature Beckons to the Desolate Machine"	February 15, 2014	Wilderness Interface Zone		Wilderness Interface Zone	
"Eden's Cur"	June 2018	NewMyths.com 43			
"How Do We Make Sense of What Will Be When We Hold Remnants of What Once Was?"	2019	Mormon Lit Blitz		lit.mormonartist.net	
"Decreation"	Fall/Winter 2019	Cold Mountain Review	with artist Jackie Leishman; same project, different poems		
"Decreation: Climate Change, Art, Science and Poetry"	2020	Whitefish Review	with artist Jackie Leishman		
"Decreation"	Fall 2020	Flyway Journal of Writing and Environment	with artist Jackie Leishman		

== Non-fiction ==
Title	Type of publication	Time of first publication	Publisher	Full text link	Citation
Science: The Key to Theology, Volume One: Preliminaries	book	2017	BCC Press		
"The Current Philosophy of Consciousness Landscape: Where Does LDS Thought Fit?"	article	Summer 2011	Dialogue	Dialogue	
"An Ecologist's View of Latter-Day Saint Culture and the Environment"	article	2006	Religious Studies Center (RSC)	RSC	
"My Madness"	personal essay	Summer 2008	Dialogue	Dialogue	
"America adds a shameful chapter to the history of torture"	op-ed	March 8, 2008	The Salt Lake Tribune	The Salt Lake Tribune	
"Intelligent Design fails as a pretense to science that tries to set religion and evolution at odds"	op-ed	May 10, 2008	The Salt Lake Tribune	The Salt Lake Tribune	
"Science Suffers When Getting a Grant Becomes the Goal"	article	2008	The Chronicle of Higher Education		
"Crawling Out of the Primordial Soup: A Step toward the Emergence of an LDS Theology Compatible with Organic Evolution"	article	Spring 2010	Dialogue	Dialogue	
"Crossing Boundaries, Part One"	personal essay	May 24, 2011	Wilderness Interface Zone	web.archive.org	
"Crossing Boundaries, Part Two"	personal essay	May 25, 2011	Wilderness Interface Zone	web.archive.org	
Why Nature Matters: A Special Issue of Dialogue on Mormonism and the Environment	intro to special issue that Peck edited for	Summer 2011	Dialogue	Dialogue	
"Reverencing Creation"	personal essay	June 25, 2012	Sunstone	Sunstone	
"Who Will Do the Science if Western Land Grab is Successful?"	op-ed	March 17, 2013	Deseret News	Deseret News	
"Five Wagers on What Intelligent Life Elsewhere in the Universe Will Be Like"	"science fact" article	March 2015	Analog Science Fiction and Fact		
"Additions to St. Hildegard's 'Physica'"	creative non-fiction	June 1, 2017	Prairie Schooner	mappingliteraryutah.org	
"Trajectories in the Evolution of Mormon Studies on Faith and Science"	essay	2019	Mormon Studies Review	Scholarly Publishing Collective	
"Each Atom an Agent?"	essay	2021	BYU Studies Quarterly	BYU Studies	

=== Blogs ===
- By Common Consent
- Mormon Organon
