= Portrait of a Sick Man =

Painting by Titian

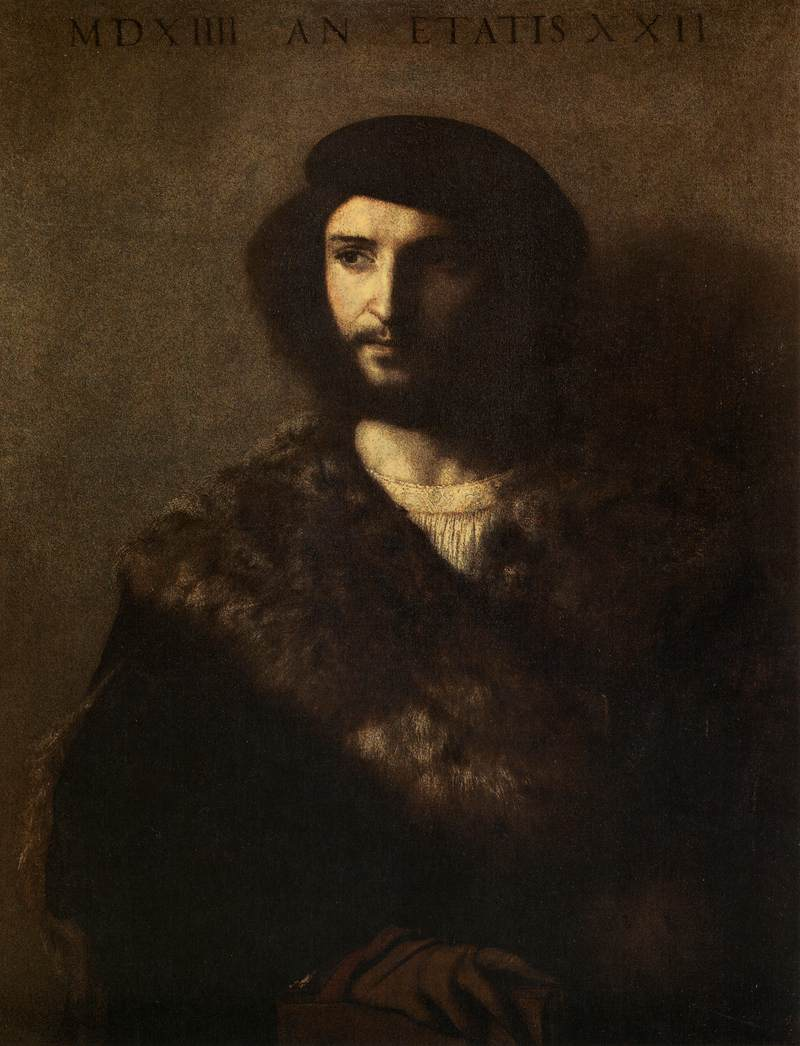
Portrait of a Sick Man, 1515 (81 x 60 cm; 31.8 x 23.6 in)

Portrait of a Sick Man is an oil on canvas painting by Titian, from 1515. It is now in the Uffizi, in Florence.

== Composition ==
The work is inscribed "MDXIIIII AN. ETATIS XXII". Its title derives solely from the unknown subject's pallid face and melancholy expression. One hypothesis holds him to be Claudio Tolomei, but this is not widely accepted.

== Provenance ==
The work is recorded in Leopoldo de' Medici's collections, which on his death entered the grand-ducal collections, which later passed to the Uffizi and other museums in Florence. In the earliest inventories, until 1769, it was attributed to Leonardo da Vinci, then to Sebastiano del Piombo (1797) and from 1880 to 1890 to the circle of Lorenzo Lotto. The art historians Adolfo Venturi and Bernard Berenson argued against the attribution to Piombo and others started to point to Titian as a possible attribution, though it took until a 1975 restoration for this to be confirmed.

== Literary references ==
The portrait's subject inspired the protagonist in "La última visita del gentilhombre enfermo", one of thirty Giovanni Papini stories in his 1906 collection "La tragedia cotidiana". Jorge Luis Borges then in turn included the story in the volume "Libro de sueños" in his "The Library of Babel" series.

== See also ==
- List of works by Titian
