= Millennium Project =

Millennium Project may refer to:

- United Nations Millennium Project, a development initiative
- The Millennium Project, an independent non-profit think tank composed of futurists

== See also ==
- Millennium Mathematics Project, a joint project between the Faculties of Mathematics and Education within the University of Cambridge
- Millennium Seed Bank Partnership, an international conservation project
- Millennium Villages Project, a non-profit organization
- White House Millennium Council
