= Jorge Luis Borges and mathematics =

Motifs in the works of Jorge Luis Borges

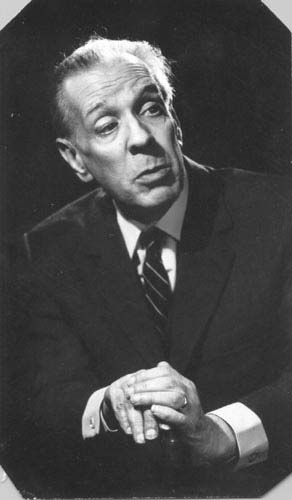
Borges in 1967

Jorge Luis Borges and mathematics concerns several modern mathematical concepts found in certain essays and short stories of Argentinian author Jorge Luis Borges (1899–1986), including concepts such as set theory, recursion, chaos theory, and infinite sequences, although Borges' strongest links to mathematics are through Georg Cantor's theory of infinite sets, outlined in "The Doctrine of Cycles" (La doctrina de los ciclos). Some of Borges' most popular works such as "The Library of Babel" (La Biblioteca de Babel), "The Garden of Forking Paths" (El Jardín de Senderos que se Bifurcan), "The Aleph" (El Aleph), an allusion to Cantor's use of the Hebrew letter aleph ($\aleph$) to denote the cardinality of transfinite sets, and "The Approach to Al-Mu'tasim" (El acercamiento a Almotásim) illustrate his use of mathematics.

According to Argentinian mathematician Guillermo Martínez, Borges at least had a knowledge of mathematics at the level of first courses in algebra and analysis at a university – covering logic, paradoxes, infinity, topology and probability theory. He was also aware of the contemporary debates on the foundations of mathematics.

== Infinity and cardinality ==
His 1939 essay "Avatars of the Tortoise" (Avatares de la Tortuga) is about infinity, and he opens by describing the book he would like to write on infinity: “five or seven years of metaphysical, theological, and mathematical training would prepare me (perhaps) for properly planning that book.”

Visualizing a measure zero set as the limit of a sequence of nested intervals. Pages in "The Book of Sand" have measure zero.

In Borges' 1941 story, "The Library of Babel", the narrator declares that the collection of books of a fixed number of orthographic symbols and pages is unending. However, since the permutations of twenty-five orthographic symbols is finite, the library has to be periodic and self-repeating.

In his 1975 short story "The Book of Sand" (El Libro de Arena), he deals with another form of infinity; one whose elements are a dense set, that is, for any two elements, we can always find another between them. This concept was also used in the physical book the short-story came from, The Book of Sand book. The narrator describes the book as having pages that are "infinitely thin", which can be interpreted either as referring to a set of measure zero, or of having infinitesimal length, in the sense of second order logic.

In his 1936 essay "The Doctrine of Cycles" (La doctrina de los ciclos), published in his essay anthology of the same year Historia de la eternidad, Borges speculated about a universe with infinite time and finite mass: "The number of all the atoms that compose the world is immense but finite, and as such only capable of a finite (though also immense) number of permutations. In an infinite stretch of time, the number of possible permutations must be run through, and the universe has to repeat itself. Once again you will be born from a belly, once again your skeleton will grow, once again this same page will reach your identical hands, once again you will follow the course of all the hours of your life until that of your incredible death." As usual with many of Borges' ideas and constructions, this line of thought was received as metaphysical speculation, a language and philosophical game. Yet almost one century later theoretical physicists are crossing the same paths, this time as a possible consequence of string theory: "“Well, if the universe is really accelerating its expansion, then we know that it’s going to get infinitely large, and that things will happen over and over and over.” And if you have infinitely many tries at something, then every possible outcome is going to happen infinitely many times, no matter how unlikely it is.".

== Geometry and topology ==
Borges in "The Library of Babel" states that "The Library is a sphere whose exact center is any hexagon and whose circumference is unattainable". The library can then be visualized as being a 3-manifold, and if the only restriction is that of being locally euclidean, it can equally well be visualized as a topologically non-trivial manifold such as a torus or a Klein bottle.

In his 1951 essay "Pascal's sphere" (La esfera de Pascal), Borges writes about a "sphere with center everywhere and circumference nowhere". A realization of this concept can be given by a sequence of spheres with contained centres and increasingly large radii, which eventually encompasses the entire space. This can be compared to the special point in "The Aleph" by the process of inversion.

Schrödinger's cat: the two outcomes can be interpreted as occurring in alternate universes with equal validity

== Quantum physics ==
In "The Garden of Forking Paths", Borges describes a novel by the fictional Chinese scholar Ts'ui Pên, whose plot bifurcates at every point in time. The idea of the flow of time branching can be compared to the many-worlds interpretation of quantum mechanics and the notion of multiverses present in some versions of string theory. Similarly, the infinitude of diverging, infinite universes in mathematical cosmology is reflected in Borges' rejection of linear, absolute time. Borges' writings address the nature of entity and the possibility of infinite "realities", as in his essay "New Time Refutations" (1946).

== Chaos theory ==
Bifurcation theory is a model in chaos theory of order appearing from a disordered system, and is a local theory that describes behavior of systems at local points. Borges anticipated the development of bifurcation theory in mathematics, through "The Garden of Forking Paths" in 1941. In "Garden", Borges captured the idea of a system splitting into multiple, uncorrelated states. For example, if a leaf floating in a river comes across a rock, it must flow across either side of the rock, and the two possibilities are statistically uncorrelated.
