= The Scholar of Moab =

Novel by Steven L. Peck

- Book Cover
- Author: Steven L. Peck
- Language: English
- Genre: Black comedy, Fiction, Mormon fiction, Satire
- Published: December 2011 (Torrey House Press)
- Publication place: United States
- Media type: Print (paperback)
- Pages: 302
- ISBN: 978-1-937226-02-2

The Scholar of Moab is a 2011 American novel written by Steven L. Peck and published by Torrey House Press. Set in Moab, Utah, it follows the life of Hyrum Thayne, a poorly educated aspiring scientist, and his superstitious local community. Thayne's unreliable first-person narrative relays the story, which explores themes including belief, faith, science, and mysticism.

Considered a notable work of Mormon fiction, The Scholar of Moab was recognized with a "best novel" award from the Association for Mormon Letters and was recommended as an "essential reading" in By Common Consent.

== Overview ==
The plot of The Scholar of Moab centers on Hyrum LeRoy Thayne, a high-school dropout from Moab. Considered an unreliable narrator, Thayne works for the United States Geological Survey and longs be a scientist and a scholar, but displays little understanding of what scientific inquiry entails. Thayne is poorly educated, and his writing features frequent misspellings.

The book is told from four points of view: Thayne, poet and mistress Dora Daphne Tanner, conjoined twins William and Edward Babcock, and a frame narrator known as the "Redactor." Some sections have characteristics of mysticism and magic realism.

Over time, Thayne becomes morally corrupt and begins to produce fictional stories which are believed by the superstitious Moab community. He comes to believe that his own flaws are preventing him from becoming the scholar that he wants to be. Critics have characterized Thayne as an antihero.

== Critical reception ==
The Scholar of Moab is cited as an example of Mormon literature. It was included in By Common Consent's essential readings in Mormonism and received the 2011 AML Award for best novel from the Association for Mormon Letters. Rosalynde Welch, writing for Dialogue, called the novel "a wonderfully strange, deeply philosophical narrative that interrogates the nature of the first person" while drawing on Mormon traditions of diaries and regionalism. In 2017 also for Dialogue, Shane R. Peterson stated that with The Scholar of Moab and A Short Stay in Hell, Peck "moved the [Mormon Literature] genre into the twenty-first century because of his willingness to push boundaries, embrace the unorthodox, and explore difficult themes." It was a finalist for the Montaigne Medal.

== See also ==
- Magic realism
- Mormon literature
- Steven L. Peck bibliography
