= Plus Magazine =

Online popular mathematics magazine

Plus Magazine is an online popular mathematics magazine run under the Millennium Mathematics Project at the University of Cambridge.

Plus contains:

- feature articles on all aspects of mathematics;
- reviews of popular maths books and events;
- a news section;
- mathematical puzzles and games;
- interviews with people in maths related careers;
- Plus Podcast – Maths on the Move

== History ==
Plus was initially named PASS Maths (Public Awareness and Schools Support for Maths) in 1997, when it was a project of the Interactive Courseware Research and Development Group, based jointly at the University of Cambridge and Keele University. Plus is now part of the Millennium Mathematics Project, a long term national initiative based in Cambridge and active across the UK and internationally.

Authors of articles in Plus include Stephen Hawking and Marcus du Sautoy.

Plus won the 2001 Webby for Best Science Site on the Web, and has been described as "an excellent site put together by those with a real love for the subject". In 2006 the Millennium Mathematics Project, of which Plus is a part, won the Queen's Anniversary Prize for Higher Education.
