= Andrásfai graph =

Family of triangle-free circulant graphs

- Named after: Béla Andrásfai
- Vertices: $3n-1$
- Edges: $\frac{n(3n-1)}{2}$
- Diameter: 2
- Properties: Triangle-free; Circulant
- Notation: And(n)

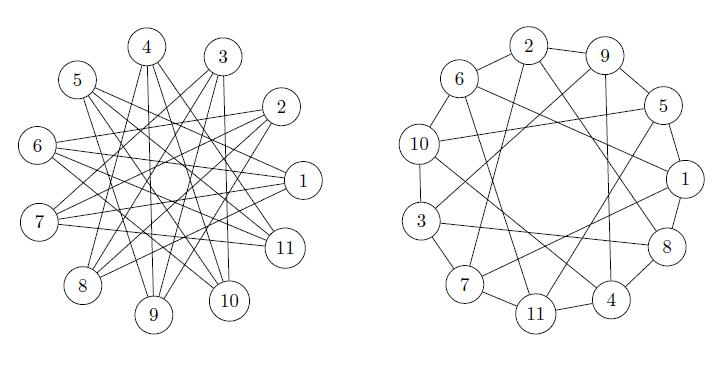
Two drawings of the And(4) graph

In graph theory, an Andrásfai graph is a triangle-free, circulant graph named after Béla Andrásfai.

== Properties ==
The Andrásfai graph And(n) for any natural number n ≥ 1 is a circulant graph on 3n − 1 vertices, in which vertex k is connected by an edge to vertices k ± j, for every j that is congruent to 1 mod 3. For instance, the Wagner graph is an Andrásfai graph, the graph And(3).

The graph family is triangle-free, and And(n) has an independence number of n. From this the formula R(3,n) ≥ 3(n − 1) results, where R(n,k) is the Ramsey number. The equality holds for n = 3 and n = 4 only.

The Andrásfai graphs were later generalized.

== Bibliography ==
- Godsil, Chris; Royle, Gordon F. (2013) [2001]. "§6.10–6.12: The Andrásfai Graphs—Andrásfai Coloring Graphs, A Characterization". Algebraic Graph Theory. Graduate Texts in Mathematics. Vol. 207. Springer. pp. 118–123. ISBN 978-1-4613-0163-9.
- Andrásfai, Béla (1977). Introductory graph theory. Akadémiai Kiadó, Budapest and Adam Hilger Ltd. Bristol, New York. p. 268. OCLC 895132932.
- Weisstein, Eric W. "Andrásfai Graph". MathWorld.

== Related Items ==
- Petersen graph
- Cayley graph
