= What We Cannot Know =

2016 book by Marcus du Sautoy

- Front cover
- Author: Marcus du Sautoy
- Subject: Epistemology
- Publisher: HarperCollins
- Publication date: 19 May 2016
- Pages: 320
- ISBN: 9780007576661

What We Cannot Know: Explorations at the Edge of Knowledge is a 2016 popular science book by the British mathematician Marcus du Sautoy. He poses questions from science and mathematics and attempts to identify whether they are known, currently unknown or may be impossible to ever know.

== Background ==
The author, British mathematician Marcus du Sautoy, succeeded Richard Dawkins as Simonyi Professor for the Public Understanding of Science. His contributions to science communication include television documentaries and a co-hosting role on Dara Ó Briain: School of Hard Sums.

Du Sautoy said that the book took three years to write. He was inspired to explore unknowns in science by considering provable unknowns in mathematics: for instance, Gödel's first incompleteness theorem states that in any (sufficiently sophisticated) logical system, there are true statements about positive whole numbers that cannot be proven true. In analogy, du Sautoy says that there are unknown questions around consciousness because every person is limited to their own consciousness (like a formal system is limited to its axioms). Another mathematical analogy du Sautoy made is that Euclid's theorem—that there are infinitely many prime numbers—is a finite proof of a fact about infinity. Du Sautoy imagines that, in physics, some proof of infinitude of the universe could be similarly possible.

The book was published on 19 May 2016.

== Synopsis ==
Du Sautoy identifies seven "edges" of human knowledge, through consideration of physical objects. For instance, he questions whether it is possible to know what side a die will land on prior to rolling, using probability and chaos theory in his analysis. He explores philosophical and scientific concepts of time and consciousness. Other topics include evolutionary biology and particle physics. As well as unknown questions, he illustrates known facts from quantum physics and astronomy.

Du Sautoy connects the unknowns of human knowledge to God, recalling that a radio interviewer defined God to him as "something which transcends human understanding". He ultimately rejects belief in a deity himself. He illustrates topics with examples from his own life, such as his practice of the trumpet and cello.

== Reception ==
In Undark Magazine, science communicator John Durant praised that du Sautoy's book is "honestly self-deprecating" and that he manages to be "amiable and entertaining" without exaggerating scientific fact. Similarly, Nicola Davis of The Guardian praised that du Sautoy "exposes with humility his own confusions, apprehensions and concerns", but criticised that he "somewhat limply concludes" that what humans cannot know may remain unknown. In contrast, a writer for The Economist found the conclusion to be "optimistic" and saw the book as "fascinating". Barbara Kiser reviewed the book for Nature as a "finely synthesized study" in which du Sautoy takes readers on a "dazzling journey".

Rob Kingston recommended it as a science book of 2016 for The Times. The University of Limerick's Centre for Teaching and Learning listed it as one of seven books that they encouraged students to read in 2020.
