= Érik Desmazières =

French engraver

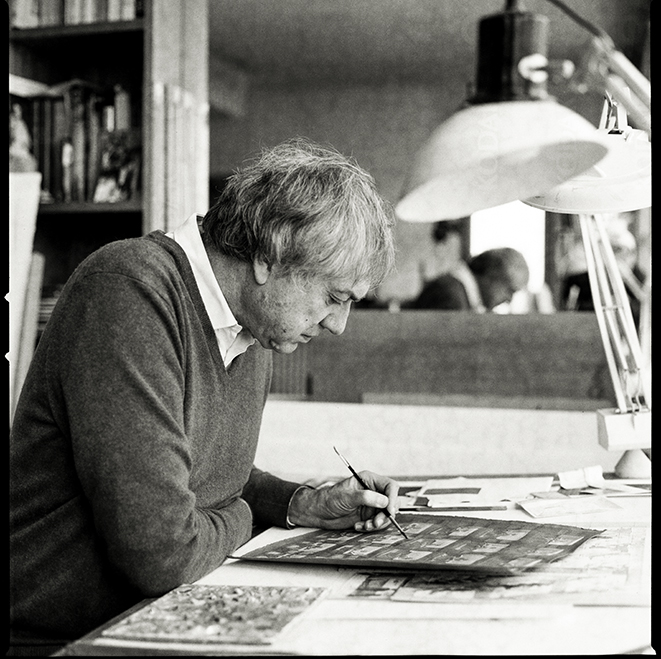
- Erik Desmazières at his home in Paris in 2015
- Born: 1948 (age 77–78); Rabat, Morocco

Érik Desmazières (born 1948 in Rabat, Morocco) is a French engraver and printmaker.

== Early life and education ==
Born in Morocco, he moved to Paris in 1967. He is a graduate of the Institut d'Etudes Politiques de Paris and studied printmaking at the evening classes of the City of Paris.

== Career ==
Desmazières received the Grand Prix of the City of Paris for engraving in 1978. He is president of the Société des peintres-graveurs français.

In 2008 he was elected to the Académie des Beaux-Arts, where he was received in 2009 and which he presided in 2016. In 2020 he was appointed director of Musée Marmottan Monet in Paris.

Desmazières provided etched illustrations for The Library of Babel by Jorge Luis Borges.

== Exhibitions ==
Desmazières' work was exhibited at the Rembrandt House Museum in Amsterdam in 2004, at the Musée Carnavalet in Paris in 2006, at the Musée Jenisch in 2007, at the Montreal Museum of Fine Arts in 2009–2010, at the Bibliothèque nationale de France in 2012, at the Museum of Fine Arts of Nancy in 2014.

== Collections ==
Desmazières' work is included in major museums (Rijksmuseum, Metropolitan Museum of Art, MFA Boston) and private collections around the world.

== Recognition ==
Desmazières is a knight of the Legion of Honour (2016), an officer of the national order of Merit, a knight of the Ordre des Palmes académiques, and an officer of the Ordre des Arts et des Lettres.

== Books ==
=== By Desmazières ===
- Desmazières, Érik (2006). Paris à grands traits: Eaux-fortes et dessins (in French). Association Paris-Musées. ISBN 978-2879009834.
- Desmazières, Érik (2007). Les lieux imaginaires (in French). Cinq Continents. ISBN 978-8874394029.
- Desmazières, Érik (2012). Voyage au centre de la bibliothèque (in French). Hazan. ISBN 978-2754106627.
- Desmazières, Érik (2019). Dans l'atelier (in French). Cinq Continents. ISBN 978-8874398577.

=== Contributions by Desmazières ===
- Rolin, Olivier; Desmazières, Érik (2006). Une invitation au voyage (in French). BnF. ISBN 978-2717723731.
- Mauriès, Patrick; Desmazières, Érik (2012). Le Miroir des vanités (in French). éditions du Regard. ISBN 978-2841052998.
- Rolin, Olivier; Desmazières, Érik (2015). À y regarder de près (in French). Seuil. ISBN 978-2021282832.
