= Eugenia Cheng =

English mathematician and pianist

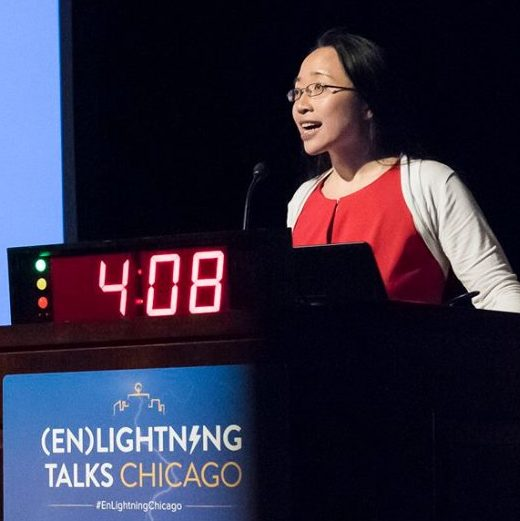
- Cheng at Phi Beta Kappa society (En)Lightning Talks Chicago in 2016
- Born: Eugenia Loh-Gene Cheng; 1 August 1976 (age 50); Hampshire, England
- Education: Roedean School; University of Cambridge (BA, PhD)
- Known for: How to Bake Pi
- Scientific career
- Fields: Category theory Popular mathematics
- Workplaces: School of the Art Institute of Chicago; University of Sheffield; University of Chicago; University of Nice Sophia Antipolis
- Thesis: Higher-dimensional category theory : opetopic foundations (2002)
- Doctoral advisor: Martin Hyland

Chinese name
- Traditional Chinese: 鄭樂雋
- Simplified Chinese: 郑乐隽
Transcriptions
Standard Mandarin
- Hanyu Pinyin: Zhèng Lèjuàn
Yue: Cantonese
- Jyutping: Zeng^{6} Lok^{6}syun^{5}
- Website: eugeniacheng.com

Eugenia Loh-Gene Cheng is a British mathematician, educator and concert pianist. Her mathematical interests include higher category theory, and as a pianist she specialises in lieder and art song. She is also known for explaining mathematics to non-mathematicians to combat math phobia, often using analogies with food and baking. Cheng is a scientist-in-residence at the School of the Art Institute of Chicago.

== Early life and education ==
Cheng was born in Hampshire, England. She moved to Sussex at the age of one. Her family is originally from Hong Kong. Her interest in mathematics stemmed from a young age thanks largely to her mother who made mathematics a part of life.

Cheng attended Roedean School. She studied the Mathematical Tripos at the University of Cambridge, where she was a student of Gonville and Caius College, Cambridge. Her postgraduate research was supervised by Martin Hyland.

== Career and research ==
As of 2020, Cheng is a scientist-in-residence at the School of the Art Institute of Chicago, where she teaches mathematics to arts students. Cheng formerly held academic appointments at the University of Nice Sophia Antipolis, the University of Sheffield and the University of Chicago.

She has published over a dozen research papers across several journals within her area of category theory.

=== Mathematics and baking ===
Cheng's research interests are in category theory, which she has written about for a general audience by using analogies from baking. Her vision is to rid the world of mathematics phobia. In How to Bake Pi, published on May 5, 2015, each chapter begins with a recipe for a dessert, to illustrate the commonalities in the methods and principles of mathematics and cooking. The book was well received and has since been translated into French.

Cheng has also written a number of papers with similar themes, such as On the perfect quantity of cream for a scone and On the perfect size for a pizza. Cheng has presented similar topics through YouTube in a light-hearted manner and has explored mathematics in other ways such as in her speech Mathematics and Lego: the untold story.

=== Other writing ===
Cheng's second book, Beyond Infinity, explains set theory for lay audiences using analogies and anecdotes, including Cantor's diagonal argument and Zeno's paradoxes. It was shortlisted for the 2017 Insight Investment Science Book Prize under the Royal Society Prizes for Science Books.

She published her third book, The Art of Logic in an Illogical World, in 2018. It explores arguments on real-world topics like same-sex marriage, white privilege, and police brutality in the United States using methods from logic, including explanations of Russell's paradox and Euclid's axioms on the way.

Cheng writes the column Everyday Math for The Wall Street Journal on topics including probability theory, set theory and Rubik's Cube solutions.

=== Music ===
Cheng is a pianist who specialises in lieder and art song. She was awarded the Sheila Mossman Memorial Award from the Associated Board of the Royal Schools of Music and was the first recipient of the Brighton and Hove Arts Council Award for the Musician of the Year. In Chicago, she gave a recital in the Pianoforte Chicago recital series; she performed Schwanengesang and Winterreise with Paul Geiger at Schubertiade Chicago in 2005 and 2006 respectively, and Die Schöne Müllerin with Ryan de Ryke at Schubertiade Chicago 2007. She performed lieder with tenor Nicholas Harkness in the Noontime Recital Series at the University of Chicago, the Salon Series at the Tower Club, and the Maxwell Recital Series, and she gave recitals for the Auxiliary Board Chapter of the Lyric Opera; she also performed La Traviata at the Oak Park Village Players.

In 2013, Cheng founded the Liederstube as an oasis for art song in the Fine Arts Building, in downtown Chicago. The mission of the Liederstube is to present and enjoy classical music in an intimate and informal setting. The Liederstube is a Not For Profit 501(c)(3) organisation.

=== Media appearances ===
Cheng has appeared on The Late Show with Stephen Colbert making mille-feuille with Stephen Colbert in 2015 to demonstrate exponentials. She was interviewed for the morning magazine show The Morning Shift on Chicago's Public Radio station WBEZ in 2017. She was interviewed by Jim Al-Khalili for The Life Scientific on BBC Radio 4, first broadcast in January 2018. She appeared on the WGBH podcast Innovation Hub in spring 2018.

== Personal life ==
Cheng met her partner, Peter “Pete” Wesoloski, when she was 39. In a 2024 Wall Street Journal article, Cheng wrote about her fertility issues and childlessness.

== Books ==
- How to Bake Pi: An Edible Exploration of the Mathematics of Mathematics. 2015. (US edition)
  - Cakes, Custard and Category Theory: Easy recipes for understanding complex maths. (original UK edition)
  - How to Bake Pi: Easy Recipes for Understanding Complex Maths. (UK Edition)
- Beyond Infinity: An Expedition to the Outer-Limits of the Mathematical Universe. 2018. (UK edition)
  - Beyond Infinity: An Expedition to the Outer Limits of Mathematics. (US edition)
- The Art of Logic: How to Make Sense in a World that Doesn't. 2019. (UK edition)
  - The Art of Logic in an Illogical World. (US edition)
- x+y: A Mathematician's Manifesto for Rethinking Gender. 2020.
- Molly and the Mathematical Mysteries. Candlewick Press. 2021. ISBN 9781536217100.
- Bake Infinite Pie With X + Y. 2022.(Illustrated by Amber Ren)
- The Joy of Abstraction: An Exploration of Math, Category Theory, and Life. 2022.
- Is Maths Real?. 2023.
- Unequal: The Maths of When Things Do and Don’t Add Up. Expected on: 5 June 2025.

== Recognition ==
Cheng is included in a deck of playing cards featuring notable female mathematicians published by the Association of Women in Mathematics.
