= Beyond Infinity (mathematics book) =

Popular mathematics book on infinity

- First edition (US)
- Author: Eugenia Cheng
- Publication date: 2017

Beyond Infinity : An Expedition to the Outer Limits of Mathematics is a popular mathematics book by Eugenia Cheng centered on concepts of infinity. It was published by Basic Books and (with a slightly different title) by Profile Books in 2017, and in a paperback edition in 2018. It was shortlisted for the 2017 Royal Society Insight Investment Science Book Prize.

== Topics ==
The book is divided into two parts, with the first exploring notions leading to concepts of actual infinity, concrete but infinite mathematical values. After an exploration of number systems, this part discusses set theory, cardinal numbers, and ordinal numbers, transfinite arithmetic, and the existence of different infinite sizes of sets. Topics used to illustrate these concepts include Hilbert's paradox of the Grand Hotel, Cantor's diagonal argument, and the unprovability of the continuum hypothesis.

The second part concerns mathematics related to the idea of potential infinity, the assignment of finite values to the results of infinite processes including growth rates, limits, and infinite series. This part also discusses Zeno's paradoxes, Dedekind cuts, the dimensions of spaces, and the possibility of spaces of infinite dimensions, with a mention of higher category theory, Cheng's research specialty.

The mathematics is frequently lightened and made accessible with personal experiences and stories, involving such subjects as the Loch Ness Monster, puff pastry, boating, dance contests, shoes, "Legos, the iPod Shuffle, snorkeling, Battenberg cakes and Winnie-the-Pooh".

== Audience and reception ==
The Royal Society judges called Beyond Infinity "a very engaging introduction to a forbidding subject". Similarly, reviewer Anne Haworth calls it "engaging and readable", and Wall Street Journal reviewer Sam Kean writes that its "chatty tone keeps things fresh". It is aimed at a popular audience, not assumed to have a significant background in mathematics, including "the young or those brimming with curiosity" as well as college or secondary-school students, although it may be "too elementary for mathematicians or mathematics students".

As similar reading material, reviewer Andrew James Simoson suggests placing this book alongside The Book of Numbers by John Horton Conway and Richard K. Guy (1996), One Two Three... Infinity by George Gamow (1947), and Really Big Numbers by Richard Schwartz (2014).
