= The Library of Babel (website) =

Website by Jonathan Basile

Library of Babel
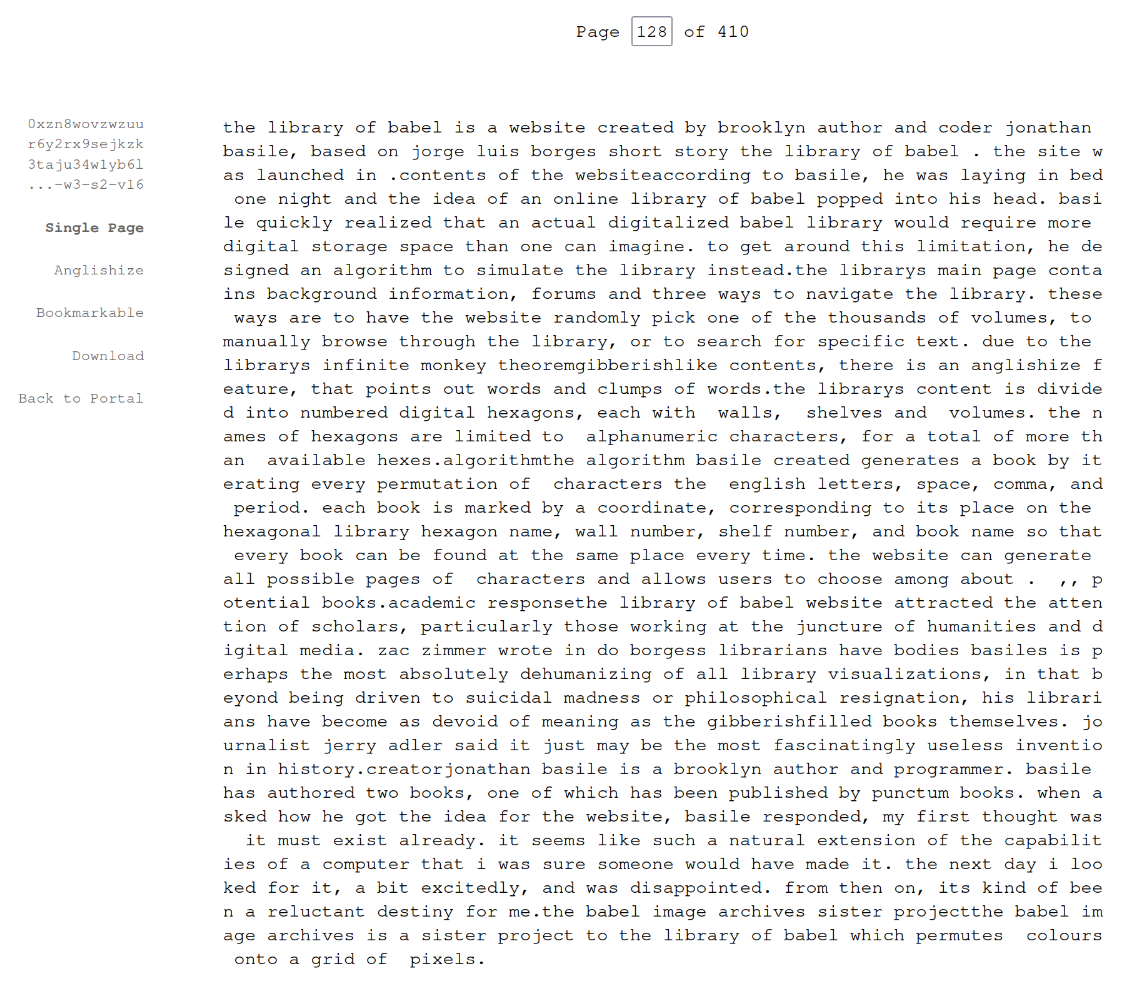
- Screenshot of a page of a book at libraryofbabel.info, containing this Wikipedia page as of November 6th, 2025; omitting special characters and numbers.
- Available in: English
- Founded: 2015
- Founder: Jonathan Basile
- Website: libraryofbabel.info

The Library of Babel is a website created by Brooklyn author and coder Jonathan Basile, based on Jorge Luis Borges' short story "The Library of Babel" (1941). The site was launched in 2015.

== Contents of the website ==
According to Basile, he "was laying in bed one night and the idea of an online Library of Babel popped into [his] head." Basile quickly realized that an actual digitalized Babel Library would require more digital storage space than one can imagine. To get around this limitation, he designed an algorithm to simulate the library instead.

The Library's main page contains background information, forums and three ways to navigate the library. These ways are to have the website randomly pick one of the thousands of "volumes", to manually browse through the library, or to search for specific text. Due to the library's Infinite monkey theorem-gibberish-like contents, there is an "Anglishize" feature, that points out words and clumps of words.

The library's content is divided into numbered digital hexagons, each with 4 walls, 20 shelves and 640 volumes. The names of hexagons are limited to 3260 alphanumeric characters, for a total of more than 10^{5229} available hexes.

== Algorithm ==
The algorithm Basile created generates a 'book' by iterating every permutation of 29 characters: the 26 English letters, space, comma, and period. Each book is marked by a coordinate, corresponding to its place on the hexagonal library (hexagon name, wall number, shelf number, and book name) so that every book can be found at the same place every time. The website can generate all possible pages of 3200 characters and allows users to choose among about 1.956 × 10^{1,834,097} potential books.

== Academic response ==
The Library of Babel website attracted the attention of scholars, particularly those working at the juncture of humanities and digital media. Zac Zimmer wrote in Do Borges's librarians have bodies: "Basile's is perhaps the most absolutely dehumanizing of all Library visualizations, in that beyond being driven to suicidal madness or philosophical resignation, his Librarians have become as devoid of meaning as the gibberish-filled books themselves." Journalist Jerry Adler said "It just may be the most fascinatingly useless invention in history."

== Creator ==
Jonathan Basile is a Brooklyn author and programmer. Basile has authored two books, one of which has been published by Punctum Books. When asked how he got the idea for the website, Basile responded, "My first thought was — it must exist already. It seems like such a natural extension of the capabilities of a computer that I was sure someone would have made it. The next day I looked for it, a bit excitedly, and was disappointed. From then on, it’s kind of been a reluctant destiny for me."

== The Babel Image Archives sister project ==
The Babel Image Archives is a sister project to The Library of Babel which permutes 4096 colours onto a grid of 416×640 pixels.
