= Playing with Infinity =

Popular math book by Rózsa Péter

- First German edition cover
- Author: Rózsa Péter
- Original title: Das Spiel mit dem Unendlichen
- Language: German
- Genre: Mathematics
- Publisher: Teubner
- Publication date: 1955
- English publication date: 1961

Playing with Infinity: Mathematical Explorations and Excursions (German: Das Spiel mit dem Unendlichen) is a popular mathematics book by Hungarian mathematician Rózsa Péter, published in German in 1955 and in English in 1961.

== Publication history and translations ==
Playing with Infinity was originally written in 1943 by mathematician Rózsa Péter, based on a series of letters Péter had written to a non-mathematical friend, Marcell Benedek. Because of World War II, it was not published until 1955, in German, under the title Das Spiel mit dem Unendlichen, by Teubner.

An English translation by Zoltán Pál Dienes was published in 1961 by G. Bell & Sons in England, and by Simon & Schuster in the US. The English version was reprinted in 1976 by Dover Books. The German version was also reprinted, in 1984, by Verlag Harri Deutsch. The book has also been translated into Polish in 1962 and Russian in 1967. The Basic Library List Committee of the Mathematical Association of America has suggested its inclusion in undergraduate mathematics libraries.

== Topics ==
Playing with Infinity presents a broad panorama of mathematics for a popular audience. It is divided into three parts, the first of which concerns counting, arithmetic, and connections from numbers to geometry both through visual proofs of results in arithmetic like the sum of finite arithmetic series, and in the other direction through counting problems for geometric objects like the diagonals of polygons. These ideas lead to more advanced topics including Pascal's triangle, the Seven Bridges of Königsberg, the prime number theorem and the sieve of Eratosthenes, and the beginnings of algebra and its use in proving the impossibility of certain straightedge and compass constructions.

The second part begins with the power of inverse operations to construct more powerful systems of numbers: negative numbers from subtraction, and rational numbers from division. Later topics in this part include the countability of the rationals, the irrationality of the square root of 2, exponentiation and logarithms, graphs of functions, slopes and areas of curves, and complex numbers. Topics in the third part include non-Euclidean geometry, higher dimensions, mathematical logic, the failings of naive set theory, and Gödel's incompleteness theorems.

In keeping with its title, these topics allow Playing with Infinity to introduce many different ways in which ideas of infinity have entered mathematics, in the notions of infinite series and limits in the first part, countability and transcendental numbers in the second, and the introduction of infinite points in projective geometry, higher dimensions, metamathematics, and undecidability in the third.

== Audience and reception ==
Reviewer Philip Peak writes that the book succeeds in showing readers the joy of mathematics without getting them bogged down in calculations and formulas. On a similar note, Michael Holt recommends the book to mathematics teachers, as a sample of the more conceptual style of mathematics taught in Hungary at the time in contrast to the orientation towards practical calculation of English pedagogy. Reuben Goodstein summarizes it more succinctly as "the best book on mathematics for everyman that I have ever seen".

By the time of Leon Harkleroad's review in 2011, the book had become "an acknowledged classic of mathematical popularization". However, Harkleroad also notes that some idiosyncrasies of the translation, such as its use of pre-decimal British currency, have since become quaint and old-fashioned. And similarly, although W. W. Sawyer in reviewing the original 1955 publication calls its inclusion of topics from graph theory and topology "truly modern", Harkleroad points out that more recent works in this genre have included other topics in their own quest for modernity such as "fractals, public-key cryptography, and internet search engines", which for obvious reasons Péter omits.
