= Precision: The Measure of All Things =

- Genre: Physics documentary
- Presented by: Marcus du Sautoy
- Country of origin: United Kingdom
- Original language: English
- No. of series: 1
- No. of episodes: 3

Production
- Running time: 1 hour

Original release
- Network: BBC Four
- Release: 10 June – 24 June 2013

Precision: The Measure of All Things is a three-part British television series presented by Professor Marcus du Sautoy outlining aspects of the history of measurement. It was originally aired in June 2013 on BBC Four.

== Episodes ==
=== Episode 1: Time and Distance ===
Professor Marcus du Sautoy tells the story of the metre and the second - how an astonishing journey across revolutionary France gave birth to the metre, and how scientists today are continuing to redefine the measurement of time and length, with extraordinary results.

=== Episode 2: Mass and Moles ===
Professor Marcus du Sautoy explores the history of Le Grand K - the world's master kilogramme - and the race to replace it now that it has been discovered to be losing weight. Professor Marcus du Sautoy explores the history of this strange object and the astonishing modern day race to replace it.

=== Episode 3: Heat, Light and Electricity ===
From lightning bolts and watt engines to electromagnetic waves and single electrons, Professor Marcus du Sautoy continues his journey into the world of measurement as he reveals how we came to measure and harness the power of heat, light and electricity. It's a journey that has involved the greatest minds in science and, today, is getting down to the very building blocks of atoms.
