= Rózsa Péter =

Hungarian mathematician (1905–1977)

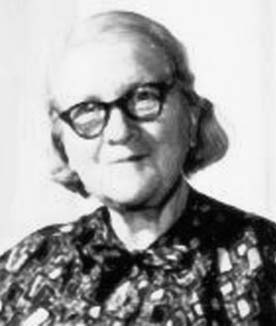
- Rózsa Péter
- Born: Rózsa Politzer; 17 February 1905; Budapest, Austria-Hungary
- Died: 16 February 1977 (aged 71); Budapest, Hungary
- Citizenship: Hungarian
- Scientific career
- Fields: Mathematics

Rózsa Péter, until January 1934 Rózsa Politzer, (17 February 1905 – 16 February 1977) was a Hungarian mathematician and logician. She is best known as the "founding mother of recursion theory".

== Early life and education ==
Péter was born in Budapest, Hungary, as Rózsa Politzer (Hungarian: Politzer Rózsa). She attended Pázmány Péter University (now Eötvös Loránd University), originally studying chemistry but later switching to mathematics. She attended lectures by Lipót Fejér and József Kürschák. While at university, she met László Kalmár; they would collaborate in future years and Kalmár encouraged her to pursue her love of mathematics.

After graduating in 1927, Politzer could not find a permanent teaching position although she had passed her exams to qualify as a mathematics teacher. Due to the effects of the Great Depression, many university graduates could not find work and she began private tutoring. At this time, she also began her graduate studies.

== Professional career and research ==
Initially, Politzer began her graduate research on number theory. Upon discovering that her result on the existence of odd perfect numbers had already been discovered in the work of Robert Carmichael and L. E. Dickson, she abandoned mathematics to focus on poetry. However, she was convinced to return to mathematics by her friend László Kalmár, who suggested she research the work of Kurt Gödel on the theory of incompleteness. She prepared her own, different proofs to Gödel's work.

Politzer presented the results of her paper on recursive theory, "Rekursive Funktionen", to the International Congress of Mathematicians in Zürich, Switzerland in 1932. In the summer of 1933, she worked with Paul Bernays in Göttingen, Germany, for the long chapter on recursive functions in the book Grundlagen der Mathematik that appeared in 1934 under the names of David Hilbert and Bernays. Her main results are summarised in the book and also appeared in several articles in the leading journal of mathematics, the Mathematische Annalen, the first in 1934. Publication was under the name Politzer-Péter as she had changed her Jewish surname Politzer into Péter that same year. For her research, she received her PhD summa cum laude in 1935. In 1936, she presented a paper entitled "Über rekursive Funktionen der zweiten Stufe" to the International Congress of Mathematicians in Oslo. These papers helped to found the modern field of recursive function theory as a separate area of mathematical research.

In 1937, she was appointed as contributing editor of the Journal of Symbolic Logic.

After the passage of the Jewish Laws of 1939 in Hungary, Péter was forbidden to teach because of her Jewish origin and was briefly confined to a ghetto in Budapest. During World War II, she wrote her book Playing with Infinity: Mathematical Explorations and Excursions, a work for lay readers on the topics of number theory and logic. Originally published in Hungarian, it has been translated into English and at least a dozen other languages.

With the end of the war in 1945, Péter received her first full-time teaching appointment at the Budapest Teachers' Training College. In 1952, she was the first Hungarian woman to be made an Academic Doctor of Mathematics. After the College closed in 1955, she taught at Eötvös Loránd University until her retirement in 1975. She was a popular professor, known as "Aunt Rózsa" to her students.

In 1951, she published her key work Rekursive Funktionen, the first book on modern logic by a female author, later translated into English as Recursive Functions. She continued to publish important papers on recursive theory throughout her life. In 1959, she presented a major paper "Über die Verallgemeinerung der Theorie der rekursiven Funktionen für abstrakte Mengen geeigneter Struktur als Definitionsbereiche" to the International Symposium in Warsaw (later published in two parts in 1961 and 1962).

Beginning in the mid-1950s, Péter applied recursive function theory to computers. Her final book, published in 1976, was Rekursive Funktionen in der Komputer-Theorie (Recursive Functions in Computer Theory). Originally published in Hungarian, it was the second Hungarian mathematical book to be published in the Soviet Union because its subject matter was considered indispensable to the theory of computers. It was translated into English in 1981.

== Honors ==
Péter was awarded the Kossuth Prize in 1951. She received the Manó Beke Prize by the János Bolyai Mathematical Society in 1953, the Silver State Prize in 1970, and the Gold State Prize in 1973. In 1973, she became the first woman to be elected to the Hungarian Academy of Sciences.

== See also ==
- Ackermann function
- Recursive function theory
- List of pioneers in computer science

== Bibliography ==
- Albers, Donald J.; Alexanderson, Gerald L.; Reid, Constance, eds. (1990), "Rozsa Peter 1905–1977", More Mathematical People, Harcourt Brace Jovanovich, p. 149
- Andrásfai, Béla (1986). "Rózsa (Rosa) Péter". Periodica Polytechnica Electrical Engineering. 30 (2–3): 139–145.
- Andrásfai, Béla (1997). "Rozsa Peter: Founder of Recursive Function Theory". Women in Science: A Selection of 16 Contributors. San Diego Supercomputer Center.
- O'Connor, John J.; Robertson, Edmund F., "Rózsa Péter", MacTutor History of Mathematics Archive, University of St Andrews
- dead link (2023). "Rózsa Péter". EpiGeneSys. Archived from the original on 26 March 2017.
- Morris, Edie; Harkleroad, Leon (1990). "Rózsa Péter: recursive function theory's founding mother". The Mathematical Intelligencer. 12 (1): 59–64. doi:10.1007/BF03023988. S2CID 120595680.
- von Plato, Jan (2017). The Great Formal Machinery Works. Princeton University Press.
- Péter, Rózsa (1957). Rekursive Funktionen (in German) (2., erw. Ausg., Reprint 2021 ed.). De Gruyter. doi:10.1515/9783112573082. ISBN 9783112573075.
- Péter, Rózsa (1961). "Über die Verallgemeinerung der Theorie der rekursiven Funktionen für abstrakte Mengen geeigneter Struktur als Definitionsbereiche". Acta Mathematica Academiae Scientiarum Hungaricae. 12 (3–4): 271–314. doi:10.1007/BF02023919. S2CID 121988998.
- Péter, Rózsa (1962). "Über die Verallgemeinerung der Theorie der rekursiven Funktionen für abstrakte Mengen geeigneter Struktur als Definitionsbereiche (Fortsetzung)". Acta Mathematica Academiae Scientiarum Hungaricae. 13 (1–2): 1–24. doi:10.1007/BF02033622. S2CID 189791355.
- Péter, Rózsa (1967). Recursive Functions (3d revised ed.). Academic Press. ISBN 978-0125526500.
- Péter, Rózsa (1981). Recursive Functions in Computer Theory. Ellis Horwood. p. 179. ISBN 9780470271957.
- Riddle, Larry (16 January 2022). "Rózsa Péter". Biographies of Women Mathematicians. Agnes Scott College.
- Tamássy, István (1994). "Interview with Róza Péter". Modern Logic. 4 (3): 277–280.
