= How to Bake Pi =

2015 book by Eugenia Cheng

How to Bake Pi: An Edible Exploration of the Mathematics of Mathematics
- First edition
- Author: Eugenia Cheng
- Language: English
- Subject: Mathematics
- Genre: Popular mathematics
- Publisher: Basic Books
- Publication date: 2015
- Publication place: United States
- Pages: 288
- ISBN: 978-0-465-05171-7

How to Bake Pi is a popular mathematics book by Eugenia Cheng published in 2015. Each chapter of the book begins with a recipe for a dessert, to illustrate the methods and principles of mathematics and how they relate to one another. The book is an explanation of the foundations and architecture of category theory, a branch of mathematics that formalizes mathematical structure and its concepts.
