= The Story of Maths =

- Title screenshot
- Genre: Mathematics documentary
- Presented by: Marcus du Sautoy
- Country of origin: United Kingdom
- Original language: English
- No. of series: 1
- No. of episodes: 4

Production
- Running time: 58 minutes

Original release
- Network: BBC Four
- Release: 6 October – 27 October 2008

The Story of Maths is a four-part British television series outlining aspects of the history of mathematics. It was a co-production between the Open University and the BBC and aired in October 2008 on BBC Four. The material was written and presented by University of Oxford professor Marcus du Sautoy. The consultants were the Open University academics Robin Wilson, professor Jeremy Gray and June Barrow-Green. Kim Duke is credited as series producer.

The series comprised four programmes respectively titled: The Language of the Universe; The Genius of the East; The Frontiers of Space; and To Infinity and Beyond. Du Sautoy documents the development of mathematics covering subjects such as the invention of zero and the unproven Riemann hypothesis, a 150-year-old problem for whose solution the Clay Mathematics Institute has offered a $1,000,000 prize. He escorts viewers through the subject's history and geography. He examines the development of key mathematical ideas and shows how mathematical ideas underpin the world's science, technology, and culture.

He starts his journey in ancient Egypt and finishes it by looking at current mathematics. Between he travels through Babylon, Greece, India, China, and the medieval Middle East. He also looks at mathematics in Europe and then in America and takes the viewers inside the lives of many of the greatest mathematicians.

== "The Language of the Universe" ==
In this opening programme Marcus du Sautoy looks at how important and fundamental mathematics is to our lives before looking at the mathematics of ancient Egypt, Mesopotamia, and Greece.

Du Sautoy commences with Egyptian mathematics, since recording the patterns of the seasons and in particular the flooding of the Nile was essential to their economy. Egyptian geometry addresses its need to solve practical problems such as land area for taxation purposes. Du Sautoy discovers Egyptian numerals decimal system based on the fingers on the hands and ancient Egyptian multiplication. He examines the Rhind Papyrus, the Moscow Papyrus and explores their understanding of binary numbers, fractions and solid shapes.

He then continues with Babylonian mathematics and discovered that the way we tell the time today is based on the Babylonian 60 base number system. So because of the Babylonians we have 60 seconds in a minute, and 60 minutes in an hour. He then shows how the Babylonians used quadratic equations to measure their land. He deals briefly with Plimpton 322.

In Greece, the home of ancient Greek mathematics, he looks at the contributions of some of its greatest and well known mathematicians including Pythagoras, Plato, Euclid, and Archimedes, who are some of the people who are credited with beginning the transformation of mathematics from a tool for counting into the analytical subject we know today. A controversial figure, Pythagoras' teachings were considered suspect and his followers seen as social outcasts and a little bit strange and not in the norm. There is a legend going around that one of his followers, Hippasus, was drowned when he announced his discovery of irrational numbers. As well as his work on the properties of right angled triangles, Pythagoras developed another important theory after observing musical instruments. He discovered that the intervals between harmonious musical notes are always in whole number intervals. It deals briefly with Hypatia of Alexandria.

== "The Genius of the East" ==
With the decline of ancient Greece, the development of maths stagnated in Europe. However the progress of mathematics continued in the East. Du Sautoy describes both the Chinese use of maths in engineering projects and their belief in the mystical powers of numbers. He mentions Qin Jiushao.

He describes Indian mathematicians’ invention of trigonometry; their introduction of a symbol for the number zero and their contribution to the new concepts of infinity and negative numbers. It shows Gwalior Fort where zero is inscribed on its walls. It mentions the work of Brahmagupta and Bhāskara II on the subject of zero. He mentions Madhava of Sangamagrama and Aryabhata and illustrates the - historically first exact - formula for calculating the π (pi).

Du Sautoy then considers the Middle East: the invention of the new language of algebra and the evolution of a solution to cubic equations. He talks about the House of Wisdom with Muhammad ibn Mūsā al-Khwārizmī and he visits University of Al-Karaouine. He mentions Omar Khayyám.

Finally he examines the spread of Eastern knowledge to the West through mathematicians such as Leonardo Fibonacci, famous for the Fibonacci sequence. He mentions Niccolò Fontana Tartaglia.

== "The Frontiers of Space" ==
Flagellation of Christ
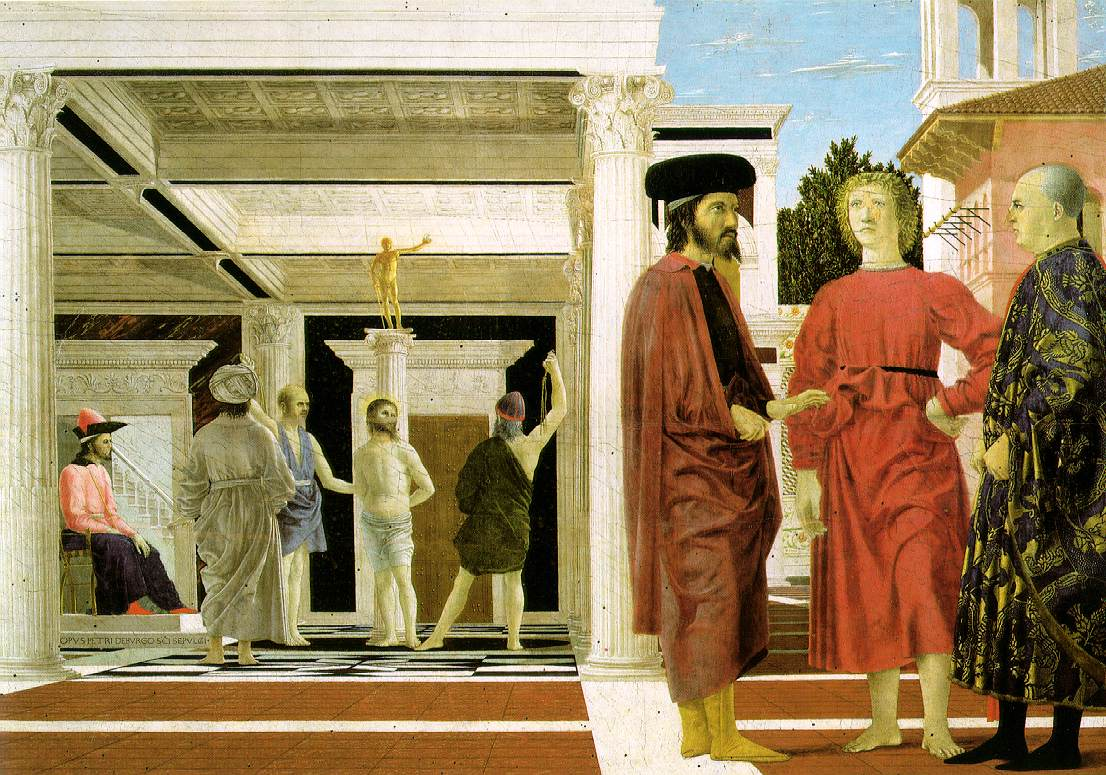
- Year: probably 1455–1460
- Location: Galleria Nazionale delle Marche

From the seventeenth century, Europe replaced the Middle East as the engine house of mathematical ideas. Du Sautoy visits Urbino to introduce perspective using mathematician and artist, Piero della Francesca's The Flagellation of Christ.

Du Sautoy proceeds to describes René Descartes realisation that it was possible to describe curved lines as equations and thus link algebra and geometry. He talks with Henk J. M. Bos about Descartes. He shows how one of Pierre de Fermat's theorems is now the basis for the codes that protect credit card transactions on the internet. He describes Isaac Newton’s development of math and physics crucial to understanding the behaviour of moving objects in engineering. He covers the Leibniz and Newton calculus controversy and the Bernoulli family. He further covers Leonhard Euler, the father of topology, and Gauss's invention of a new way of handling equations, modular arithmetic. He mentions János Bolyai.

The further contribution of Gauss to our understanding of how prime numbers are distributed is covered thus providing the platform for Bernhard Riemann's theories on prime numbers. In addition Riemann worked on the properties of objects, which he saw as manifolds that could exist in multi-dimensional space.

== "To Infinity and Beyond" ==
=== Hilbert's first problem ===
The final episode considers the great unsolved problems that confronted mathematicians in the 20th century. On 8 August 1900 David Hilbert gave a historic talk at the International Congress of Mathematicians in Paris. Hilbert posed twenty-three then unsolved problems in mathematics which he believed were of the most immediate importance. Hilbert succeeded in setting the agenda for 20thC mathematics and the programme commenced with Hilbert's first problem.

Georg Cantor considered the infinite set of whole numbers 1, 2, 3 ... ∞ which he compared with the smaller set of numbers 10, 20, 30 ... ∞. Cantor showed that these two infinite sets of numbers actually had the same size as it was possible to pair each number up; 1 - 10, 2 - 20, 3 - 30 ... etc.

If fractions now are considered there are an infinite number of fractions between any of the two whole numbers, suggesting that the infinity of fractions is bigger than the infinity of whole numbers. Yet Cantor was still able to pair each such fraction to a whole number 1 - ^{1}/_{1}; 2 - ^{2}/_{1}; 3 - ^{1}/_{2} ... etc. through to ∞; i.e. the infinities of both fractions and whole numbers were shown to have the same size.

But when the set of all infinite decimal numbers was considered, Cantor was able to prove that this produced a bigger infinity. This was because, no matter how one tried to construct such a list, Cantor was able to provide a new decimal number that was missing from that list. Thus he showed that there were different infinities, some bigger than others.

However, there was a problem that Cantor was unable to solve: Is there an infinity sitting between the smaller infinity of all the fractions and the larger infinity of the decimals? Cantor believed, in what became known as the Continuum Hypothesis, that there is no such set. This would be the first problem listed by Hilbert.

=== Poincaré conjecture ===
Next Marcus discusses Henri Poincaré's work on the discipline of 'Bendy geometry'. If two shapes can be moulded or morphed to each other's shape then they have the same topology. Poincaré was able to identify all possible two-dimensional topological surfaces; however in 1904 he came up with a topological problem, the Poincaré conjecture, that he could not solve; namely what are all the possible shapes for a 3D universe.

According to the programme, the question was solved in 2002 by Grigori Perelman who linked the problem to a different area of mathematics. Perelman looked at the dynamics of the way things can flow over the shape. This enabled him to find all the ways that 3D space could be wrapped up in higher dimensions.

=== David Hilbert ===
The achievements of David Hilbert were now considered. In addition to Hilbert's problems, Hilbert space, Hilbert Classification and the Hilbert Inequality, du Sautoy highlights Hilbert's early work on equations as marking him out as a mathematician able to think in new ways. Hilbert showed that, while there were an infinity of equations, these equations could be constructed from a finite number of building block like sets. Hilbert could not construct that list of sets; he simply proved that it existed. In effect Hilbert had created a new more abstract style of Mathematics.

=== Hilbert's second problem ===
For 30 years Hilbert believed that mathematics was a universal language powerful enough to unlock all the truths and solve each of his 23 Problems. Yet, even as Hilbert was stating We must know, we will know, Kurt Gödel had shattered this belief; he had formulated the Incompleteness Theorem based on his study of Hilbert's second problem:

This statement cannot be proved

Using a code based on prime numbers, Gödel was able to transform the above into a pure statement of arithmetic. Logically, the above cannot be false and hence Gödel had discovered the existence of mathematical statements that were true but were incapable of being proved.

=== Hilbert's first problem revisited ===
In 1950s American mathematician Paul Cohen took up the challenge of Cantor's Continuum Hypothesis which asks "is there is or isn't there an infinite set of number bigger than the set of whole numbers but smaller than the set of all decimals". Cohen found that there existed two equally consistent mathematical worlds. In one world the Hypothesis was true and there did not exist such a set. Yet there existed a mutually exclusive but equally consistent mathematical proof that Hypothesis was false and there was such a set. Cohen would subsequently work on Hilbert's eighth problem, the Riemann hypothesis, although without the success of his earlier work.

=== Hilbert's tenth problem ===
Hilbert's tenth problem asked if there was some universal method that could tell whether any equation had whole number solutions or not. The growing belief was that no so such method was possible yet the question remained, how could you prove that, no matter how ingenious you were, you would never come up with such a method. He mentions Paul Cohen. To answer this Julia Robinson, who created the Robinson Hypothesis which stated that to show that there was no such method all you had to do was cook up one equation whose solutions were a very specific set of numbers: The set of numbers needed to grow exponentially yet still be captured by the equations at the heart of Hilbert's problem. Robinson was unable to find this set. This part of the solution fell to Yuri Matiyasevich who saw how to capture the Fibonacci sequence using the equations at the heart of Hilbert's tenth.

=== Algebraic geometry ===
The final section briefly covers algebraic geometry. Évariste Galois had refined a new language for mathematics. Galois believed mathematics should be the study of structure as opposed to number and shape. Galois had discovered new techniques to tell whether certain equations could have solutions or not. The symmetry of certain geometric objects was the key. Galois' work was picked up by André Weil who built algebraic geometry, a whole new language. Weil's work connected number theory, algebra, topology and geometry.

Finally du Sautoy mentions Weil's part in the creation of the fictional mathematician Nicolas Bourbaki and another contributor to Bourbaki's output - Alexander Grothendieck.

== See also ==
- Chemistry: A Volatile History
- The Story of Science: Power, Proof and Passion
