= The Library of Babel =

Short story by Jorge Luis Borges

- Short story by Jorge Luis Borges
- English edition cover, with illustration by Érik Desmazières
- Original title: La biblioteca de Babel
- Translator: numerous
- Country: Argentina
- Language: Spanish
- Genre: Fantasy

Publication
- Published in: El Jardín de senderos que se bifurcan
- Publisher: Editorial Sur
- Publication date: 1941
- Published in English: 1962

"The Library of Babel" (Spanish: La biblioteca de Babel) is a short story by Argentine author and librarian Jorge Luis Borges (1899–1986), conceiving of a universe in the form of a vast library containing all possible 410-page books of a certain format and character set.

The story was originally published in Spanish in Borges' 1941 collection of stories El jardín de senderos que se bifurcan (The Garden of Forking Paths). That entire book was, in turn, included within his much-reprinted Ficciones (1944). Two English-language translations appeared approximately simultaneously in 1962, one by James E. Irby in a diverse collection of Borges's works titled Labyrinths and the other by Anthony Kerrigan as part of a collaborative translation of the entirety of Ficciones.

== Plot ==
Borges' narrator describes how his universe consists of an enormous expanse of adjacent hexagonal rooms. In each room, there is an opening in the floor to the hexagons above and below, four walls of bookshelves, and two junctions between hexagons each containing a latrine, a sleeping closet, and a stairwell. Though the order and content of the books are random and apparently completely meaningless, the inhabitants believe that the books contain every possible ordering of just 25 basic characters (22 letters, the period, the comma, and space). Though the vast majority of the books in this universe are pure gibberish, by definition the library also must contain, somewhere, every coherent book ever written, or that might ever be written, and every possible permutation or slightly erroneous version of every one of those books. The narrator notes that the library must contain all useful information, including predictions of the future, biographies of any person, and translations of every book in all languages. Conversely, for many of the texts, some language could be devised that would make it readable with any of a vast number of different contents. The description of the library's architecture was revised by Borges in later editions. In the 1941 first edition, five walls of each hexagonal room were lined with bookshelves, while the 1956 edition reduced this to four walls, leaving two sides open. The change made the library's structure more consistent with its depiction as an indefinitely extending space.

Despite these theories, all books are functionally totally useless to the reader, as any correct, legible text that can exist occurs due to pure chance and must exist alongside countless completely incorrect writings. This leads to many superstitions, cults, and heresies within the wider organized religion of the library; the "Purifiers" arbitrarily destroy books they deem nonsense as they scour through the library seeking the "Crimson Hexagon" and its illustrated, magical books. Others believe that since all books exist in the library, somewhere one of the books must be a perfect index of the library's contents; some even believe that a messianic figure known as the "Man of the Book" has read it, and they travel through the library seeking him. The narrator notes the population of the library has been gravely decimated by centuries of religious conflict and disease, but maintains his faith in the beauty and organization of the library as undeniable proof of a God or other demiurge, reaffirming his own attempts to find some ultimate meaning to the library and humanity's existence within it.

== Themes ==
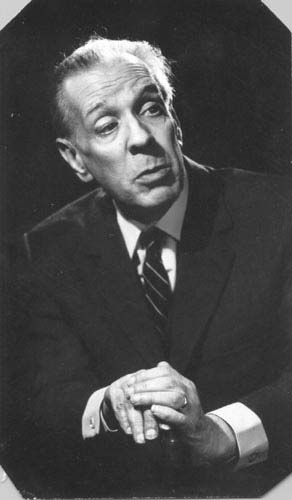
Borges in 1967

The story repeats the theme of Borges' 1939 essay "The Total Library" ("La Biblioteca Total"), which in turn acknowledges the earlier development of this theme by Kurd Lasswitz in his 1901 story "The Universal Library" ("Die Universalbibliothek"):

Certain examples that Aristotle attributes to Democritus and Leucippus clearly prefigure it, but its belated inventor is Gustav Theodor Fechner, and its first exponent, Kurd Lasswitz. [...] In his book The Race with the Tortoise (Berlin, 1919 [sic]), Dr Theodor Wolff suggests that it is a derivation from, or a parody of, Ramón Llull's thinking machine [...] The elements of his game are the universal orthographic symbols, not the words of a language [...] Lasswitz arrives at twenty-five symbols (twenty-two letters, the space, the period, the comma), (Note: In fact, Lasswitz (1904) uses an alphabet of 100 symbols, and never mentions the numbers 22 or 25.) whose recombinations and repetitions encompass everything possible to express in all languages. The totality of such variations would form a Total Library of astronomical size. Lasswitz urges mankind to construct that inhuman library, which chance would organize and which would eliminate intelligence. (Wolff's The Race with the Tortoise expounds the execution and the dimensions of that impossible enterprise.)

Many of Borges' signature motifs are featured in the story, including infinity, reality, cabalistic reasoning, and labyrinths. The concept of the library is often compared to Borel's dactylographic monkey theorem. There is no reference to monkeys or typewriters in "The Library of Babel", although Borges had mentioned that analogy in "The Total Library": "[A] half-dozen monkeys provided with typewriters would, in a few eternities, produce all the books in the British Museum." In this story, the closest equivalent is the line, "A blasphemous sect suggested [...] that all men should juggle letters and symbols until they constructed, by an improbable gift of chance, these canonical books." Borges makes an oblique reference to reproducing Shakespeare, as the only decipherable sentence in one of the books in the library, "O time thy pyramids", is surely taken from the beginning of Shakespeare's Sonnet 123: "No! Time, thou shalt not boast that I do change / Thy pyramids..."

Borges would examine a similar idea in his 1976 story, "The Book of Sand", in which there is an infinite book (or book with an indefinite number of pages) rather than an infinite library. Moreover, the story's Book of Sand is said to be written in an unknown alphabet and its content is not obviously random. In "The Library of Babel", Borges interpolates Italian mathematician Bonaventura Cavalieri's suggestion that any solid body could be conceptualized as the superimposition of an infinite number of planes.

The concept of the library is also overtly analogous to the view of the universe as a sphere having its center everywhere and its circumference nowhere. The mathematician and philosopher Blaise Pascal employed this metaphor, and in an earlier essay Borges noted that Pascal's manuscript called the sphere effroyable, or "frightful".

The quote at the beginning of the story, "By this art you may contemplate the variation of the twenty-three letters", is from Robert Burton's 1621 The Anatomy of Melancholy.

== Philosophical implications ==
=== Infinite extent ===
In mainstream theories of natural language syntax, every syntactically valid utterance can be extended to produce a new, longer one, because of recursion. However, the books in the Library of Babel are of bounded length ("each book is of four hundred and ten pages; each page, of forty lines, each line, of some eighty letters"), so the Library can only contain a finite number of distinct strings. Borges' narrator notes this fact, but believes that the Library is nevertheless infinite; he speculates that it repeats itself periodically, giving an eventual "order" to the "disorder" of the seemingly random arrangement of books. Mathematics professor William Goldbloom Bloch confirms the narrator's intuition, deducing in his popular mathematics book The Unimaginable Mathematics of Borges' Library of Babel that the library's structure necessarily has at least one room whose shelves are not full (because the number of books per room does not divide the total number of books evenly), and the rooms on each floor of the library must either be connected into a single Hamiltonian cycle, or possibly be disconnected into subsets that cannot reach each other.

=== Quine's reduction ===
W. V. O. Quine notes that the Library of Babel is finite, and that any text that does not fit in a single book can be reconstructed by finding a second book with the continuation. The size of the alphabet can be reduced by using Morse code even though it makes the books more verbose; the size of the books can also be reduced by splitting each into multiple volumes and discarding the duplicates. Writes Quine, "The ultimate absurdity is now staring us in the face: a universal library of two volumes, one containing a single dot and the other a dash. Persistent repetition and alternation of the two are sufficient, we well know, for spelling out any and every truth. The miracle of the finite but universal library is a mere inflation of the miracle of binary notation: everything worth saying, and everything else as well, can be said with two characters."

Quine’s two-volume reduction, however, conflates a library with an alphabet. A volume containing a dot and a volume containing a dash are sufficient symbols for constructing any finite text, but they do not themselves contain those texts. The information distinguishing one text from another lies in the ordered sequence of repetitions. If all duplicates are discarded, that sequence must be recorded elsewhere. Without such an external ordering mechanism, only the two individual symbols remain. Thus the information content of the original library cannot be compressed into two books—it has merely been displaced into the instructions required to reconstruct each string, which would require an infinite library.

== Comparison with biology ==
The full possible set of protein sequences (protein sequence space) has been compared to the Library of Babel. In the Library of Babel, finding any book that made sense was almost impossible due to the sheer number and lack of order. The same would be true of protein sequences if it were not for natural selection, which has picked out only protein sequences that make sense. Additionally, each protein sequence is surrounded by a set of neighbors (point mutants) that are likely to have at least some function. Daniel Dennett's 1995 book Darwin's Dangerous Idea includes an elaboration of the Library of Babel concept to imagine the set of all possible genetic sequences, which he calls the Library of Mendel, in order to illustrate the mathematics of genetic variation. Dennett uses this concept again later in the book to imagine all possible algorithms that can be included in his Toshiba computer, which he calls the Library of Toshiba. He describes the Library of Mendel and the Library of Toshiba as subsets within the Library of Babel.

== Influence on later works ==
- Érik Desmazières provided etched illustrations for a 1997 edition of the short story, depicting the library as literally built in the shape of Bruegel's Tower of Babel.
- Umberto Eco's postmodern novel The Name of the Rose (1980) features a labyrinthine library, presided over by a blind monk named Jorge of Burgos. The room is, however, octagonal in shape.
- Russell Standish's Theory of Nothing uses the concept of the Library of Babel to illustrate how an ultimate ensemble containing all possible descriptions would in sum contain zero information and would thus be the simplest possible explanation for the existence of the universe. This theory, therefore, implies the reality of all universes.
- The Unimaginable Mathematics of Borges' Library of Babel (2008) by William Goldbloom Bloch explores the short story from a mathematical perspective. Bloch analyzes the hypothetical library presented by Borges using the ideas of topology, information theory, and geometry.
- In Greg Bear's novel City at the End of Time (2008), the sum-runners carried by the protagonists are intended by their creator to be combined to form a 'Babel', an infinite library containing every possible permutation of every possible character in every possible language. Bear has stated that this was inspired by Borges, who is also namechecked in the novel. Borges is described as an unknown Argentinian who commissioned an encyclopedia of impossible things, a reference to either "Tlön, Uqbar, Orbis Tertius" or the Book of Imaginary Beings.
- The Library of Babel, a website created by Jonathan Basile, emulates an English-language version of Borges' library. An algorithm he created generates a "book" by iterating every permutation of 29 characters: the 26 English letters, space, comma, and period. Each book is marked by a coordinate, corresponding to its place on the hexagonal library (hexagon name, wall number, shelf number, and book name) so that every book can be found at the same place every time. The website is said to contain "all possible pages of 3,200 characters, about 10^{4677} books". For example, a coordinate may look like "389fj39l-w4-s5-v32" where, "389fj39l" is the hexagon name, "w4" specifies wall 4, "s5" specifies shelf 5, and "v32" specifies volume 32. This has inspired similar projects for images (permuting 4,096 colours onto a grid of 416×640 pixels) and audio (permuting one-second audio clips at a quality of 44.1 kHz and 16 bits).
- In Steven L. Peck's novella A Short Stay In Hell (2009), the protagonist must find the book of his life's story in a library containing every possible book. Borges' story is mentioned directly, although the library is structured very differently. It is also explicitly finite in size, though it is more than a million orders of magnitude larger than the observable universe.
- Turkish media artist Refik Anadol created the installation Archive Dreaming (2017), inspired by Borges' The Library of Babel. Anadol's work employs machine learning algorithms to create an immersive, interactive digital archive, visually exploring infinite combinations of data and memory, thus reflecting Borges' concepts of infinite knowledge, randomness, and order.
- Library of Ruina (2021) is a South Korean deck-building video game whose titular location is heavily inspired by the Library of Babel. People defeated in combat within the library are turned into books that can be manipulated in various means, which leads to the protagonist Angela trying to find the "One True Book".
- DC Comics Justice League (2018) Issue #60-63 makes reference to the Library of Babel. The Justice League Dark members enter the fictional world of the book to retrieve Merlin's spellbook (as it is a library that has every book in existence).
- The world of Black Beacon (2024), a Chinese ARPG, takes much inspiration from the Library of Babel. In the game, the Babel Library is an endless labyrinth formed through infinite permutations based on the space within the Babel Tower. "The library holds everything; it is the sum of all things our languages can express."

== See also ==
- Encyclopedia Galactica (Asimov)
- The Aleph (short story) (Borges)
- A Hundred Thousand Billion Poems (Queneau)
- Akashic records
- Infinite monkey theorem
- Law of truly large numbers
- Normal number
- The Library of Babel (website)
- Universal library
- World Brain
