= Do Not Erase: Mathematicians and Their Chalkboards =

Photo-essay of mathematicians' chalkboards

Do Not Erase: Mathematicians and their Chalkboards is a photo-essay book on the blackboards of mathematicians. It was photographed and edited by Jessica Wynne, and published in 2021 by the Princeton University Press.

== Background ==
Wynne is a professor of photography at the Fashion Institute of Technology in New York City. She came to this project through an acquaintance with mathematicians Amie Wilkinson and Benson Farb, neighbors of hers in Cape Cod, and through a trip to India from which she brought back a set of photographs she had taken of school chalkboards in Jaipur.

The title of the book harks back to the legend of Archimedes commanding his killer not to erase his circles. In modern times, adding "do not erase" as an annotation on a filled-up chalkboard is a familiar way to request the preservation of its contents. By photographing these chalkboards, Wynne has given them significantly more permanence than they otherwise would have.

== Contents ==
Do Not Erase is formatted as a sequence of 109 two-page spreads, printed unusually in landscape mode: the pages are approximately letter size, but wider than they are tall. Each spread features a full-color photograph of a mathematician's chalkboard, generally viewed straight on without visual embellishment, although some include scenery visible through nearby windows. These are paired with commentary by the same mathematician, as well as a brief description of who they are and where they work. Most of the photographs show the chalkboard in a moment drawn from the mathematician's work on it, depicting how mathematicians think, work, and communicate with each other. Some other photographs show chalk drawings that were deliberately created to be photographed for this book. The mathematicians themselves are not depicted. Many of their comments relate to their tactile pleasure in using chalk, to the semi-permanence of partially-legible erasures from chalkboards, and to the pacing the use of chalk imparts to mathematical talks. Other comments give the story behind the specific notation depicted in the photograph.

The mathematicians included in this work range from schoolteachers and users of mathematics in other academic disciplines, students and junior faculty, and prominent research mathematicians including Alain Connes, Terence Tao, and three other Fields Medalists.

== Audience and reception ==
One complaint made by reviewer Athanase Papadopoulos is that the selection of mathematicians in Do Not Erase is very US-centric, with some major centers of mathematical research in Russia, China, Japan, and India entirely omitted. Owen Toller suggests that the glimpses of mathematics seen in the photos will be largely meaningless to many readers, giving only an impression of their work that is "superficial and extrinsic in a vaguely post-modern way".

Other reviewers are more positive: Papadopoulos finds the images beautiful, and suggests that the book would make an appropriate gift to a friend. Barry Hayes describes the photos as "sumptuous". Writing from the point of view as a mathematician, Adhemar Bultheel calls it "a wonderful mirror" that could help other mathematicians think about what they do, while Elizaveta Dubrovina finds it to be "a nostalgic reminder of the tactility of chalk and the conviviality of in-person collaboration" in what has become a largely online world, her choice as a mathematical coffee table book. And Edward Valauskas takes issue with Toller's suggestion that this would be incomprehensible to a general audience, writing "many of the observations by mathematicians in this book on their chalk handiwork are understandable to non-mathematically inclined, not requiring some sort of futuristic universal translator. For that, I am quite grateful."
