= Kám =

- Location of Vas county in Hungary

- Location of Kám
- Coordinates: 47.10256°N 16.87559°E
- Country: Hungary
- County: Vas

Area
  - Total: 15.3 km^{2} (5.9 sq mi)

Population (2004)
  - Total: 465
  - Density: 30.39/km^{2} (78.7/sq mi)
- Time zone: UTC+1 (CET)
  - Summer (DST): UTC+2 (CEST)
- Postal code: 9841
- Area code: 94

Kám is a defunct village 69 kilometres (43 mi) west of Budapest in Vas county, Hungary. Jeli Arboretum is 3.7 kilometres (2.3 mi) away.

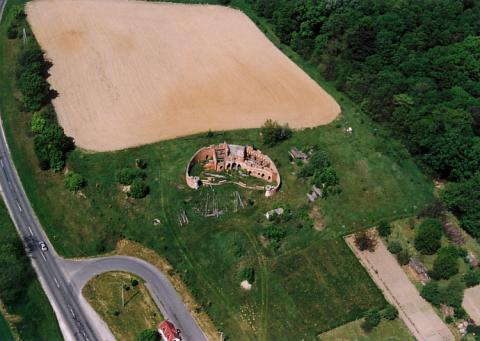
Ruins from a bird's eye view at the intersection of roads 8 and 87.
