= The Music of the Primes =

Book by Marcus du Sautoy

- First UK edition
- Author: Marcus du Sautoy
- Language: English
- Genre: Non-fiction
- Publisher: Fourth Estate
- Publication date: 2003

The Music of the Primes (British subtitle: Why an Unsolved Problem in Mathematics Matters; American subtitle: Searching to Solve the Greatest Mystery in Mathematics) is a 2003 book by Marcus du Sautoy, a professor in mathematics at the University of Oxford, on the history of prime number theory. In particular he examines the Riemann hypothesis, the proof of which would revolutionize our understanding of prime numbers. He traces the prime number theorem back through history, highlighting the work of some of the greatest mathematical minds along the way.

The cover design for the hardback version of the book contains several pictorial depictions of prime numbers, such as the number 73 bus. It also has an image of a clock, referring to clock arithmetic, which is a significant theme in the text.
