= Common Hope =

Common Hope is a non-profit organization based out of St. Paul, Minnesota that works with people in Guatemala. Common Hope provides support for over 2,700 children to attend school each year in seventeen villages outside of Antigua and Guatemala City. Common Hope employs a comprehensive approach by focusing their efforts on education, health care, housing, and family development.
