= A Short Stay in Hell =

Novella by Steven L. Peck

- Author: Steven L. Peck
- Genre: Psychological horror, philosophical horror
- Publisher: Lulu Enterprises Incorporated (2009), Strange Violin Editions (2012)
- Publication date: 20 June 2009
- Publication place: United States
- Pages: 87

A Short Stay in Hell is a 2009 psychological horror novella by the American writer Steven L. Peck. It follows Soren Johanssen, a condemned soul in Hell — which has taken the form of a library orders of magnitude larger than the known universe — tasked with searching for a book that perfectly describes his Earthly life.

The premise of the novella is adapted from "The Library of Babel", a 1941 short story by Jorge Luis Borges. Themes include the afterlife, the absurdity of eternity, and the inability of the human mind to process large numbers.

== Plot ==
Soren, a Mormon geologist who died of cancer, finds himself in the waiting room of Hell. A demon explains that everyone in the room has been condemned for not following the one true religion, Zoroastrianism. Each person in the waiting room is sent to their own personal Hell. The demon sends Soren to the Library of Babel, a gargantuan library bisected by an enormous chasm. The library contains every book that can possibly be written on 410 pages, with 40 lines of 80 characters on each page each being one of the 95 regular characters on a standard keyboard. Soren realizes that he has been restored to peak physical health and endowed with a photographic memory of his life on Earth and his stay in hell. Magical kiosks located periodically along the library create any food or drink the inhabitants request. A sign informs Soren of the rules of Hell: he will be brought back to life if he dies; he is freed from earthly covenants such as marriage; and he is allowed to leave Hell if he finds a book that exactly retells his earthly life story, with no spelling or grammatical errors.

After a week of searching, the souls fail to find a book with even a single line of coherent English. Soren tries coffee for the first time, breaking a lifetime of adherence to Mormon dietary laws. When the souls learn that the vending machines can make alcohol, a member of the group embarks on a drinking binge. An uncomfortable Soren wanders away from the group, trying to find the end of the library's floor.

One hundred years pass. Soren has since reunited with the group, who have organized themselves into a "university" for the study and worship of the few sentences of coherent text that have been discovered. Soren and Rachel, a fellow researcher at the university, fall deeply in love, and they spend one thousand years wandering the library together. In the year 1145, a violent death cult embarks on a spree of violence across the library. Cornered by the cult, Rachel jumps into the chasm, never to be seen again. Soren is captured and subjected to several weeks of torture. When brought before the cult leader, Soren tackles him, sending them both into the chasm.

After a week or more of falling, during which time Soren dies of thirst after being in free fall for so long, he finally manages to find a way to slam himself back onto a floor, far lower in the library, where he dies from wounds sustained during the attempt and is subsequently resurrected. He encounters Master Took, a mathematician who has calculated the true size of the library ($7.16^{1,297,369}$ light-years wide and deep). After centuries of mindless wandering, Soren decides he has nothing to do except start his search from the bottom of the library, and throws himself into the chasm. Eons later, Soren reaches the bottom floor. The story concludes with Soren continuing his search, clinging to the hope that Ahura Mazda, the supreme deity of Zoroastrianism, is appreciative of his efforts.

== Structure ==
The story itself is framed as a book that Soren has found on his search throughout the library. Time within the narrative is non-linear and Soren often reflects on past events from the far future.

The novella ends with a mathematical appendix explaining Master Took's calculations. Peck shows that there are $95^{1,312,000}$ books in Soren's personal Hell. To store every book in the library and provide the souls with 100 ft^{2} of living space, the library would need to be at least $7.16^{1,297,369}$ light-years wide and deep. In the prologue, it is revealed that Soren has spent at least $23^{439}=6.29\times10^{597}$ days in Hell, a timespan vastly exceeding the current estimate for the age of the universe (approximately $5.04\times10^{12}$ days).

== Background ==
Soren's personal Hell is a loose adaption of the setting of the 1941 short story The Library of Babel by Jorge Luis Borges. Unlike Borges's novella, wherein the books can be made up of 25 characters (22 unspecified letters of the Spanish alphabet, the space, the comma and the full stop), the books in A Short Stay in Hell can be made up of 95 characters, as per a standard keyboard with English layout (52 capitalised and uncapitalised letters, numbers from 0–9, 14 punctuation marks, 18 special characters, and the space).

Like the protagonist of the story, Peck is both a practicing Mormon and a scientist. While Soren is a geologist, Peck is an evolutionary biologist and works as a biology professor at Brigham Young University.

In an interview with Religion News Service, Peck revealed that A Short Stay in Hell was an unsettling story to work on: "If you do a word cloud of my reviews for that book, the most common thing is 'disturbing'. It had that effect on me too. Sometimes if there's something I'm wrestling with, I work through it by writing."

== Reception ==
Dan Wells, author of I Am Not A Serial Killer, called the book "a terrifying meditation on faith, human nature, and the relentless scope of eternity." Derek Lee of Rational Faiths was "haunted" by the story's themes of endless monotony. "For Peck, Hell isn't necessarily about being physically tortured or burned à la Dante's Inferno. [...] Instead, we find a Hell that is about sameness, monotony, mundaneness. Eons and eons of it."
