= Marcus du Sautoy =

British mathematician (born 1965)

Marcus du Sautoy OBE FRS
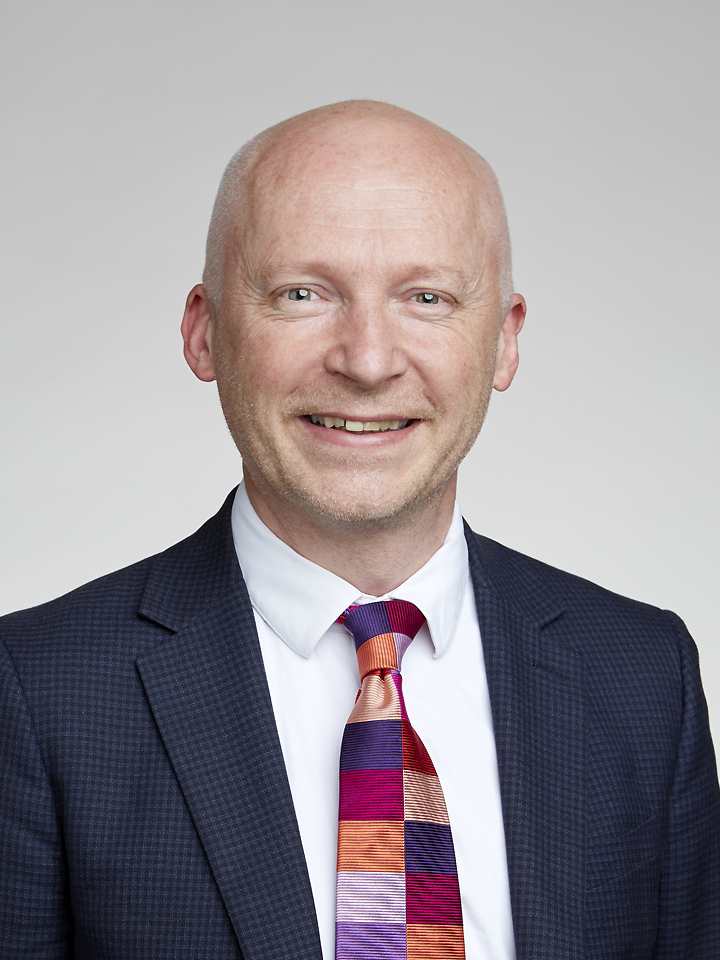
- Du Sautoy in 2016
- Born: Marcus Peter Francis du Sautoy; 26 August 1965 (age 61); London, England
- Education: King James's Sixth Form College; Gillots Comprehensive School; University of Oxford (BA, DPhil)
- Occupation: Mathematician
- Known for: The Music of the Primes
- Spouse: Shani Ram (m. 1994)
- Awards: Berwick Prize (2001); Christmas lectures (2006); Michael Faraday Prize (2009); Christopher Zeeman Medal (2014); Royal Society University Research Fellowship
- Scientific career
- Fields: Mathematics; Symmetry; Group theory Number theory Public engagement
- Workplaces: All Souls College, Oxford; Wadham College, Oxford; New College, Oxford; Hebrew University of Jerusalem
- Thesis: Discrete Groups, Analytic Groups and Poincaré Series (1989)
- Doctoral advisor: Dan Segal
- Marcus du Sautoy's voice Recorded January 2011 from the BBC Radio 4 programme In Our Time
- Website: www.simonyi.ox.ac.uk

Marcus Peter Francis du Sautoy (/dʊ ˈsoʊtɔɪ/; born 26 August 1965) is a British mathematician, Simonyi Professor for the Public Understanding of Science at the University of Oxford, Fellow of New College, Oxford, and author of popular mathematics and popular science books. He was previously a fellow of All Souls College, Oxford, and Wadham College, Oxford, and served as president of the Mathematical Association, an Engineering and Physical Sciences Research Council (EPSRC) senior media fellow, and a Royal Society University Research Fellow.

In 1996, he was awarded the title of distinction of Professor of Mathematics.

== Early life and education ==
Du Sautoy was born in London to Bernard du Sautoy, employed in the computer industry, and Jennifer (née Deason) du Sautoy, who left the Foreign Office to raise her children. He grew up in Henley-on-Thames. His grandfather, Peter du Sautoy, was chairman of the publisher Faber and Faber, and managed the estates of James Joyce and Samuel Beckett.

Du Sautoy was educated at Gillotts Comprehensive School and King James's Sixth Form College (now Henley College) and Wadham College, Oxford, where he was awarded a first class honours degree in mathematics. In 1991 he completed a doctorate in mathematics on discrete groups, analytic groups and Poincaré series, supervised by Dan Segal.

== Career and research ==
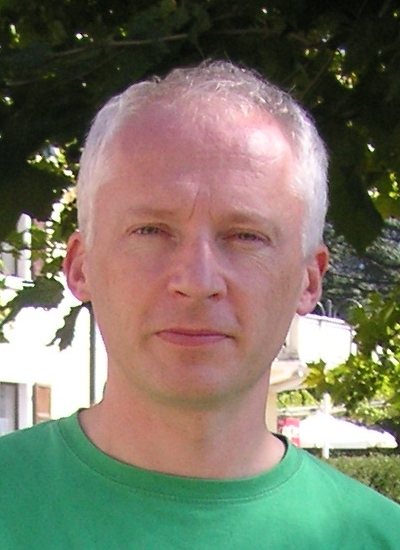
Marcus du Sautoy in 2007

Du Sautoy's research "uses classical tools from number theory to explore the mathematics of symmetry". Du Sautoy's academic work concerns mainly group theory and number theory.

Du Sautoy is known for his work popularising mathematics, and has been named by The Independent on Sunday as one of the UK's leading scientists. He has also served on the advisory board of Mangahigh.com, an online maths game website. He is a regular contributor to the BBC Radio 4's In Our Time programme and has written for The Times and The Guardian. He has written numerous academic articles and books on mathematics, the most recent being an exploration of the current state of creativity in artificial intelligence, The Creativity Code.

He is co-director of PRiSM, the Centre for Practice & Research in Science & Music at the Royal Northern College of Music, which he co-founded with composer Emily Howard.

In a 2006 article published in Seed magazine, du Sautoy discussed the Hilbert-Pólya conjecture, a way for advances in quantum physics to provide insight into the Riemann hypothesis.

=== Books ===
His popular mathematics and popular science books include:

- The Music of the Primes
- Finding Moonshine
- Symmetry: A Journey into the Patterns of Nature
- The Num8er My5teries: A Mathematical Odyssey Through Everyday Life
- What We Cannot Know
- The Great Unknown: Seven Journeys to the Frontiers of Science
- The Creativity Code: How AI Is Learning to Write, Paint and Think
- Thinking Better: The Art of the Shortcut
- Around the World in 80 Games: A mathematician unlocks the secrets of the greatest games
- Blueprints: How mathematics shapes creativity

=== Television ===
Among many other programmes, Du Sautoy presented the BBC Four television programme Mind Games and co-hosted the TV series School of Hard Sums with Dara Ó Briain. On the latter show, he posed mathematical questions with real-world applications. Ó Briain and a guest then tried to solve the problems, using rigorous and experimental methods, respectively.

In December 2006, du Sautoy delivered the 2006 Royal Institution Christmas Lectures under the collective title The Num8er My5teries. This was only the third time the subject of the lectures had been mathematics – on the first occasion, in 1978, when the lecture was delivered by Erik Christopher Zeeman, du Sautoy had been a schoolboy in the audience. Other television work includes:

- Mindgames (BBC Four, 2004–5). Presented 20 episodes of puzzle gameshow with regular guests Kathy Sykes and Michael Rosen.
- The Music of the Primes (BBC Four, 2005, BBC 2 2007). One-hour documentary based on his book.
- Painting with Numbers (Teachers TV 2006). Four fifteen-minute programmes covering numerous topics from risk and probability to concepts of infinity, from codes and cryptography to flowers and football.
- The Num8er My5teries: Royal Institution Christmas Lectures (Channel 5, 2006), five lectures about the great unsolved problems of mathematics.
- The Story of Maths (BBC Four, 2008) is a four-part series first broadcast on BBC Four. In this series he discovers techniques and theories from different times and cultures.
- Horizon: Alan and Marcus Go Forth and Multiply (BBC 2, 2009). Alan Davies embarks on a maths odyssey with the help of mathematician Marcus du Sautoy.
- Horizon: The Secret You (BBC 2, 2009). Marcus du Sautoy investigates self-awareness.
- Horizon: How Long is a Piece of String? (BBC 2, 2009). Alan Davies attempts to answer the proverbial question: How long is a piece of string? Featuring Marcus du Sautoy.
- Horizon: What Makes a Genius? (BBC 2, 2010). Marcus du Sautoy asks if geniuses' brains are fundamentally different from his.
- The Beauty of Diagrams (BBC Four, 2010). Produced by Michael Waterhouse and directed by Steven Clarke, Marcus du Sautoy discusses influential scientific diagrams, starting with Vitruvian Man, Leonardo da Vinci's iconic anatomical drawing which follows the geometrical ideas of the Roman architect Vitruvius.
- The Code (BBC 2, 2011). A three-part documentary series which began broadcasting on 27 July 2011.
- Faster Than the Speed of Light? (BBC 2, 2011). Marcus du Sautoy discusses a recent discovery, the faster-than-light neutrino anomaly, that neutrinos may travel faster than light. First broadcast on 19 October 2011.
- Horizon: The Hunt for AI (BBC 2, 2012). Marcus Du Sautoy asks how close mankind is to creating computers or robots that can think for themselves – artificial intelligence, AI. First broadcast on 3 April 2012.
- Dara Ó Briain's School of Hard Sums (Dave, 2012). Co-host with Dara Ó Briain. Dara and guests attempt to solve problems posed by Marcus Du Sautoy with mathematics or through trial and error. First broadcast on 16 April 2012.
- Precision: The Measure of All Things (BBC Four, 2013). Professor Marcus du Sautoy explores why we are driven to measure and quantify the world around us and why we have reduced the universe to just a handful of fundamental units of measurement. First broadcast on 10 June 2013.
- The Secret Rules of Modern Living: Algorithms (BBC Four, 2015). Mathematician Professor Marcus du Sautoy demystifies the hidden world of algorithms. First broadcast on 24 September 2015.

=== Awards and honours ===
Du Sautoy was awarded the Berwick Prize in 2001 by the London Mathematical Society for the publication of outstanding mathematical research. In 2009 he won the Michael Faraday Prize from the Royal Society of London for "excellence in communicating science to UK audiences". Du Sautoy was appointed Officer of the Order of the British Empire (OBE) in the 2010 New Year Honours "for services to Science". The University of Bath awarded du Satoy an Honorary Doctorate in 2010. He was elected a fellow of the American Mathematical Society in 2012 and a Fellow of the Royal Society (FRS) in 2016.

== Personal life ==
Du Sautoy lives in London with his family and plays football (No 17 for Recreativo Hackney FC) and the trumpet. He met his wife Shani while a postdoctoral researcher at the Hebrew University of Jerusalem. They have three children, who are being raised Jewish.

Du Sautoy is an atheist but has stated that as holder of the Simonyi Chair for the Public Understanding of Science he won't be pursuing an anti-religious agenda, perhaps suggesting a difference of emphasis compared with his predecessor in the past, Richard Dawkins. However, his focus is going to be "very much on the science and less on religion" He has described his own religion as being "Arsenal – football", as he sees religion as wanting to belong to a community. Du Sautoy is a supporter of Common Hope, an organisation that helps people in Guatemala.

He is the grandson of Peter du Sautoy and his godmother was Valerie Eliot, the wife and widow of T. S. Eliot.
