= Peter du Sautoy =

British publisher and editor (1912–1995)

Peter du Sautoy CBE
- Born: 19 February 1912
- Died: 16 July 1995 (aged 83)
- Employer(s): Faber & Faber; Royal Air Force; British Museum

Peter Francis du Sautoy CBE (1912–1995) was a British publisher and editor who was the chairman of Faber and Faber.

== Early life ==
Du Sautoy was born to a notable family in 1912. His father served as a colonel in the Army and received the Order of the British Empire for his services.

Du Sautoy was educated at Uppingham Foundation School and for higher education, he went to Wadham College, Oxford at the University of Oxford, where he received his Master of Arts degree.

== Career ==
In 1935, he joined the Department of Printed Books at the British Museum where he served for a year. After that, he joined the University of Oxford as an Assistant Educational Officer and worked there for three years.

In 1940, he enlisted himself in the Royal Air Force where he served until the end of the Second World War. In 1946, he joined Faber and Faber.

== Bibliography ==
- du Sautoy, Peter (1957). The Civil Service
- du Sautoy, Peter (1958). Community Development in Ghana
- du Sautoy, Peter (1964). Problems of Communication in Extension and Community Development Campaigns

== Personal life ==
He married Molly Floud, the twin sister of Peter Floud (who married the advocate of comprehensive education Jean MacDonald) and who was the sister of Bernard Floud, the Labour MP from 1964 to 1967 for Acton, who was accused of working for the KGB, and had killed himself aged 52, only days after he was interviewed by MI5 for links to the KGB. His grandchildren include Marcus du Sautoy.
