= The Book of Sand =

Short story by Jorge Luis Borges

- Short story by Jorge Luis Borges
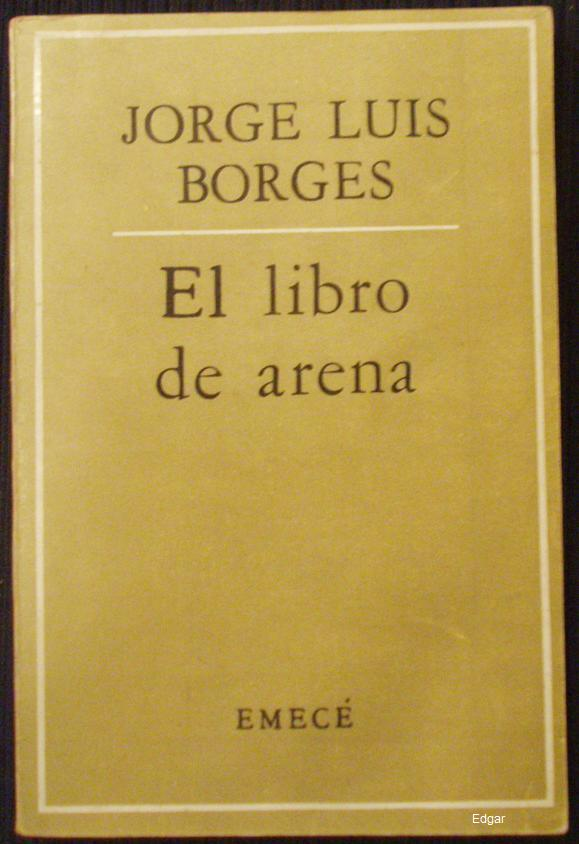
- Original title: El libro de arena
- Country: Argentina
- Language: Spanish
- Genres: Fantasy, short story

Publication
- Published in: The Book of Sand
- Media type: Print
- Publication date: 1975
- Published in English: 1977
- Pages: 6 (Dutton 1977 ed.)

"The Book of Sand" (Spanish: El libro de arena) is a 1975 short story by Argentine writer Jorge Luis Borges about the discovery of a book with infinite pages. It has parallels to the same author's 1949 story "The Zahir" (revised in 1974), continuing the theme of self-reference and attempting to abandon the terribly infinite, and to his 1941 story "The Library of Babel" about an infinite library.

== Release ==
The story was first published in 1975, in Spanish, as the last of 13 stories in a book of the same name. The first English translation—by Norman Thomas di Giovanni—was published in The New Yorker. The entire volume The Book of Sand (ISBN 0-525-47540-0) first appeared in English in 1977.

== Plot summary ==
An unnamed narrator is visited by a tall Scots Bible-seller, who presents him with a very old cloth-bound book that he bought in India from an Untouchable. The book is emblazoned with the title "Holy Writ," below which title is emblazoned "Bombay," but is said to be called "The Book of Sand"..."because neither the book nor the sand has any beginning or end." Upon opening it, he is startled to discover that the book, which is written in an unknown language and occasionally punctuated by illustrations, is, in fact, infinite: as one turns the pages, more pages seem to grow out of the front and back covers. He trades a month of his pension and a prized "Wiclif Bible" for the book and hides it on a bookshelf behind his copy of One Thousand and One Nights. Over the summer, the narrator obsesses over the book, poring over it, cataloging its illustrations and refusing to go outside for fear of its theft. In the end, realizing that the book is monstrous, he briefly considers burning it before fearing the possibility of the endless supply of smoke suffocating the world. Instead, he goes to the National Library where he once worked (like Borges) to leave the book among the basement bookshelves, reasoning that "the best place to hide a leaf is in a forest."

== Adaptations ==
The story (retitled The Sandbook) was turned into an experimental dance piece by Esther Linley's dance company for the 1994 Donaufestival in Austria. The soundtrack to the piece was written by German musician Hans-Joachim Roedelius. Roedelius also featured as an actor in the piece.

The story was adapted by the Saudi filmmaker Bader Al-Homoud in his online film and was selected as an official honoree in the 18th Annual Webby Awards in 2014.

The Dutch composer Michel van der Aa created for the 2015 Holland Festival a digital interactive song cycle based on this story, with Kate Miller-Heidke as performer.

The Oakland Theater Project staged an adaptation of the story in 2022, written by playwright Lisa Ramirez.

In 2023, a Ukrainian choreographer and performance artist alina sokulska created a series of performance works inspired by Borges' concept of the infinite knowledge, as explored in his short story The Book of Sand (1975).
