= Millennium Mathematics Project =

The Millennium Mathematics Project (MMP) was set up within the University of Cambridge in England as a joint project between the Faculties of Mathematics and Education in 1999. The MMP aims to support maths education for pupils of all abilities from ages 5 to 19 and promote the development of mathematical skills and understanding, particularly through enrichment and extension activities beyond the school curriculum, and to enhance the mathematical understanding of the general public. The project was directed by John Barrow from 1999 until September 2020.

== Programmes ==
The MMP includes a range of complementary programmes:

- The NRICH website publishes free mathematics education enrichment material for ages 5 to 19. NRICH material focuses on problem-solving, building core mathematical reasoning and strategic thinking skills. In the academic year 2004/5 the website attracted over 1.7 million site visits (more than 49 million hits).
- Plus Magazine is a free online maths magazine for age 15+ and the general public. In 2004/5, Plus attracted over 1.3 million website visits (more than 31 million hits). The website won the Webby award in 2001 for the best Science site on the Internet.
- The Motivate video-conferencing project links university mathematicians and scientists to primary and secondary schools in areas of the UK from Jersey and Belfast to Glasgow and inner-city London, with international links to Pakistan, South Africa, India and Singapore.

The project has also developed a Hands On Maths Roadshow presenting creative methods of exploring mathematics, and in 2004 took on the running of Simon Singh's Enigma schools workshops, exploring maths through cryptography and codebreaking. Both are taken to primary and secondary schools and public venues such as shopping centres across the UK and Ireland. James Grime is the Enigma Project Officer and gives talks in schools and to the general public about the history and mathematics of code breaking - including the demonstration of a genuine World War II Enigma Machine.

In November 2005, the MMP won the Queen's Anniversary Prize for Higher and Further Education.
