= Steven L. Peck =

American novelist (born 1957)

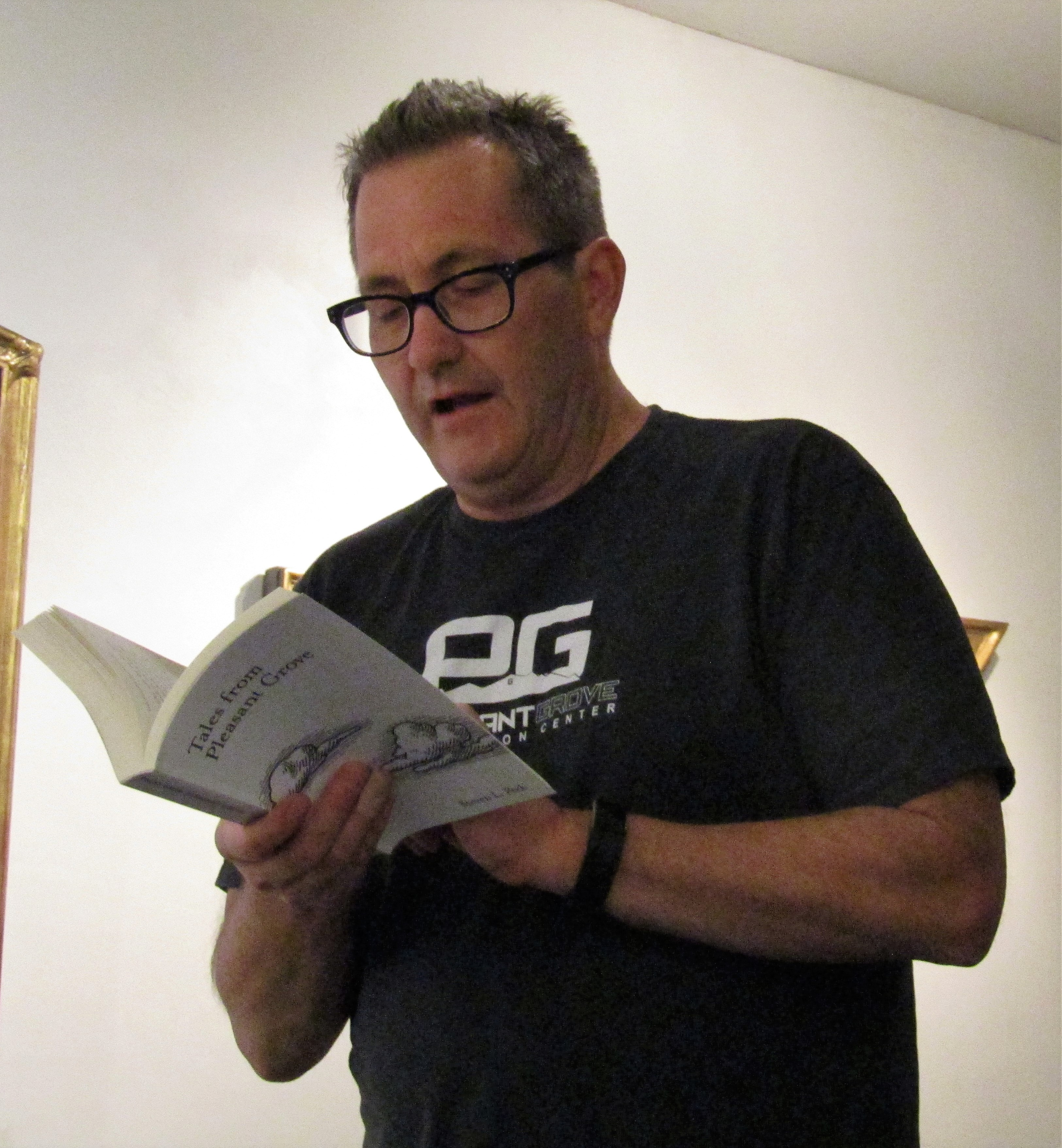
- Steven Peck in 2018
- Born: July 25, 1957 (age 69)
- Education: Brigham Young University; University of North Carolina at Chapel Hill; North Carolina State University (PhD)
- Occupations: Author, biology professor

Steven L. Peck (born July 25, 1957) is an American evolutionary biologist, poet, and novelist. His literary work is influential in Mormon literature circles. He is a professor of biology at Brigham Young University (BYU). He grew up in Moab, Utah, and lives in Pleasant Grove, Utah.

After studying at BYU and the University of North Carolina at Chapel Hill, Peck received his PhD from North Carolina State University in biomathematics and entomology. He has taught bioethics and philosophy of biology in addition to other biology classes, and teaches that evolution is not at odds with religious faith.

Peck's fiction often defies genre conventions and discusses philosophical themes. Critics have praised his unusual stories for their emotional power and their analytical approach to Mormon themes. Both The Scholar of Moab and Gilda Trillum received the Association for Mormon Letters (AML) award for best novel, and Peck received the Smith-Petit Lifetime award from the AML in 2021.

== Education and career ==
As a child, Peck enjoyed playing with toy dinosaurs and being outdoors. His father was a social worker who ran a camp in the Rocky Mountains.

After failing high school history, Peck studied to receive his GED.

He joined the Army after the Vietnam War, and was reactivated in the Church of Jesus Christ of Latter-day Saints (LDS Church) shortly afterwards. He served an LDS mission in Arkansas.

Peck received a bachelor's degree in 1986 from BYU in statistics and computer science, with a minor in zoology. He received a master's degree from University of North Carolina at Chapel Hill in environmental biostatistics, and his PhD from North Carolina State University in biomathematics and entomology in 1997. His dissertation was titled "Spatial Patterns and Processes in the Evolution of Insecticide Resistance."

He started teaching in the biology department at BYU in 2000, where he teaches bioethics and the history and philosophy of biology, among other classes.

In his work on decreasing insect-borne illness, Peck has worked as a consultant on projects with the United Nations International Atomic Energy Agency and the U.S. Department of Agriculture. He has also worked on a consultant project with the Korean Federation of Science and Technology.

== Works ==
Peck has published many scientific articles on ecology and ecological simulations in his work as a professor of biology at BYU. The topics of his literary works include evolution and religion.

Terryl Givens stated that Peck's work is "full of theological and metaphysical insight and probing". In a review for Dialogue, Mormon fiction scholar Michael Austin wrote that Peck is "one of Mormonism's best living writers" and that he writes with "a genre-busting literary style." In a book review of Wandering Realities published in BYU Studies, Scott R. Parkin described Peck as possibly "the most important Mormon fiction writer producing today." He wrote that Peck's works are by people who identify with Mormonism to the extent that they no longer question their own identity as a Mormon, and react to conflict based on that identity.

=== Critical reception ===
In A Short Stay in Hell (2009), a man must find the book of his life's story among every possible book. David Spaltro described the novella as "one of the most original and powerfully moving things I’ve ever read", and has acquired the rights to adapt it into a film. Doug Gibson at the Standard Examiner wrote that a hell that contains an "eternity of the mundane" is a "pretty effective hell." Derek Lee at Rational Faiths wrote that the novella encouraged reflection on the nature of the afterlife and what living forever would mean.

The short story collection Wandering Realities (2015) contains stories set on other worlds and this one, and many are "just plain weird" featuring "odd characters driven by peculiar demons, with each tale told in a different voice and structured in a unique way," as described by reviewer Scott R. Parkin in BYU Studies. Parkin concluded that Peck's stories move Mormon storytelling beyond a critique of the church as an institution and towards and more analytical approach to the inner life of Mormon characters. Steve Evans said the stories were "wondrous and rich."

In a summary of Peck's book Evolving Faith (2015), Michael Austin wrote, "Because all knowledge incorporates subjective assumptions, both religion and science require an element of faith." Literal interpretations of scripture cheat "both religion, by ignoring what the author of the text was really trying to tell us, and science, by setting up unnecessary oppositions between important religious principles and easily testable facts." At the Association for Mormon Letters (AML), Heather Young wrote that Evolving Faith had "enlarged my appreciation for my time on earth and the part I can play in protecting its immeasurable gifts." At By Common Consent, Steve Evans said that the book was "not for beginners" and uses terminology that is difficult to understand, and that the two parts of the book were not well-connected.

In conceiving the main character for Gilda Trillum (2017), Peck wrote vignettes for a fictional main character and her relationship with writing and the Association of Mormon Letters. Several readers believed her to be real. Peck has stated that he enjoys mixing fictional references with real ones in his fiction. Rachel Kirkwood, writing in Dialogue, felt that the various narrative fragments did not achieve the "characterization and depth for which the book seems to reach", but acknowledged that "the insufficiency of the fragments has its own charm." In another Dialogue review, Shane R. Peterson wrote that the book's strength is in its meditations on Mormon theology, and that its weakness is its presentation through the frame story of another character's dissertation, which gives Gilda a "strange distance" from the reader.

The Tragedy of King Leere, Goatherd of the La Sals (2019) received a starred review in Publishers Weekly, where its setting was described as a "fascinating world of technological solutions to global warming". In Dialogue, Kylie Nielson Turley noticed how the book is difficult to categorize, wondering if it is better to call it "a modern-day ecological interpretation of the famous Shakespearian familial tragedy" or "a dystopian novel that will haunt the reader with visions of a post-apocalyptic future". She concludes by praising the book as "a well-written and thought-provoking tragedy that can stand solidly on its own."

=== Awards and honors ===
Peck's novels and short stories have received multiple awards. The Scholar of Moab won the award for best novel from the AML in 2011, and was a finalist for the Montaigne Medal in 2012. "A Strange Report from the Church Archives" won second place in the Irreantum fiction contest in 2012. Peck received the AML award for short fiction for "Two-Dog Dose" in 2014. His non-fiction essay, "Five Wagers on What Intelligent Life Elsewhere in the Universe Will Be Like", received second place from the 2015 analytical laboratory reader's awards. Gilda Trillum received the 2017 AML award for best novel. In 2021, Peck received the AML Smith-Petit lifetime achievement award. The award citation praised his unusual fiction: "If Peck’s works are medicine, they are strong, strange, and sometimes bitter-tasting. But perhaps this dose is what we need. Peck’s unpredictability confronts both the casual and scholarly readers, both the faithful and faithless, forcing them to question stereotypes, simplistic binaries, and straightforward reversals."

== Views ==
Peck believes that God "only enters the universe through our consciousness." He compares scriptural interpretation to scientific interpretation, in that both nature and scriptures are unchanging, but our understanding of them changes over the course of generations.

On the subject of writing, Peck says that it is a way for him to explore the complexities in his life. He has stated that anything we do to build our knowledge of the universe helps to build the kingdom of God.

As a missionary, Peck taught potential members that they had to renounce evolution before being baptized. As a student at BYU, he found that biology professors taught the theory of evolution in the same way it is taught in secular schools. Peck has since become an advocate for teaching that religion and evolution are not at odds. The LDS church currently has no official position on evolution, and Peck teaches evolution in his courses at BYU.

== Personal life ==
During their honeymoon, Peck and his wife, Lori, were hit by a drunk driver in Oregon. They were badly injured, and recovered after six months. The experience led Peck to change his major from philosophy to statistics.

Peck and Lori have five children, and six grandchildren.

In 2002, Peck experienced visual hallucinations and delusions caused by a bacterial brain infection. The bacteria, Burkholderia pseudomallei, entered his brain through his optic nerve during a research trip to Vietnam in 2001. He wrote about the experience, and stated that it taught him about the nature of consciousness. On the podcast Snap Judgement, Peck said that the experience taught him that Satan could block God's influence on him, which affected how he views religious belief. Peck lives in Pleasant Grove.

== See also ==
- AML Awards
- Mormon views on evolution
